= List of volcanoes by elevation =

A list (incomplete) of volcanoes on Earth arranged by elevation in metres.

== Above 6,000 metres ==
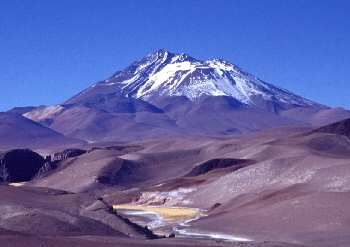
Llullaillaco

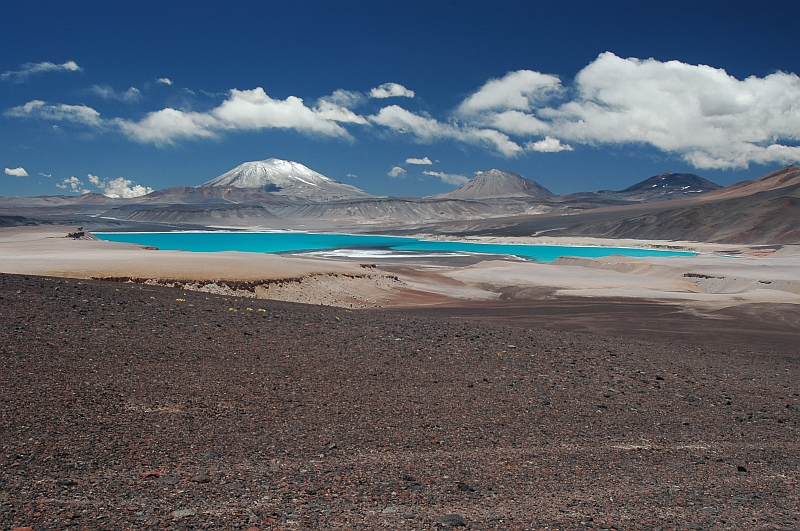
Incahuasi

Mountain	Metres	Feet	Location and notes
Ojos del Salado	6,893	22,615	Argentina/Chile – highest dormant volcano on Earth
Monte Pissis	6,793	22,287	Argentina
Nevado Tres Cruces	6,748	22,139	Argentina/Chile
Llullaillaco	6,739	22,110	Argentina/Chile – second highest active volcano on Earth
Tipas	6,660	21,850	Argentina
Nevado Tres Cruces Central	6,629	21,749	Chile
Incahuasi	6,621	21,722	Argentina/Chile
Tupungato	6,570	21,560	Argentina/Chile
Nevado Sajama	6,542	21,463	Bolivia – highest peak of Bolivia
Coropuna	6,425	21,079	Peru
Cerro El Cóndor	6,414	21,043	Argentina
Antofalla	6,409	21,027	Argentina
Parinacota	6,348	20,827	Bolivia/Chile
Ampato	6,288	20,630	Peru
Chimborazo	6,267	20,561	Ecuador – farthest point from Earth's centre
Los Patos	6,239	20,469	Argentina/Chile
Pular	6,233	20,449	Chile
Cerro Solo	6,190	20,310	Argentina/Chile
Aucanquilcha	6,176	20,262	Chile
San Pedro	6,145	20,161	Chile
Sierra Nevada	6,127	20,102	Argentina/Chile
Solimana	6,093	19,990	Peru
Aracar	6,082	19,954	Argentina
Guallatiri	6,071	19,918	Chile
Chachani	6,057	19,872	Peru
Socompa	6,051	19,852	Argentina/Chile
Acamarachi	6,046	19,836	Chile
Hualca Hualca	6,025	19,767	Peru
Uturuncu	6,008	19,711	Bolivia

== Above 5,000 metres ==
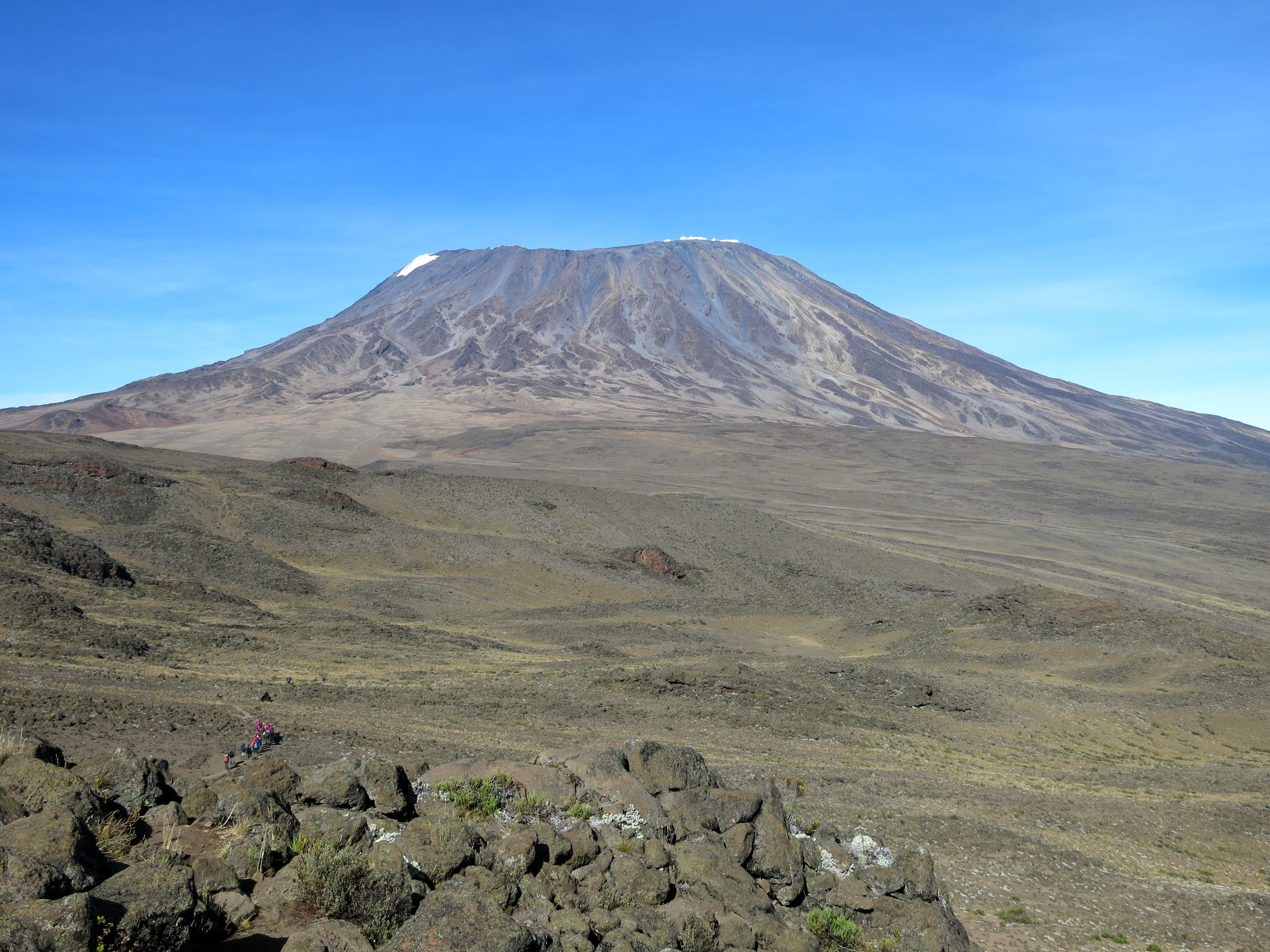
Mount Kilimanjaro

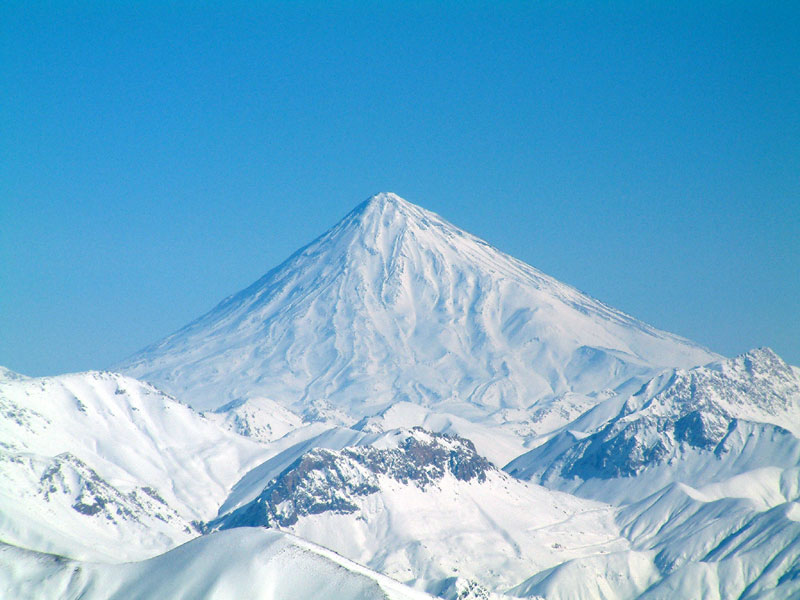
Mount Damavand

Mountain	Metres	Feet	Location and notes
Tacora	5,980	19,620	Chile
Sabancaya	5,976	19,606	Peru
Sairecabur	5,971	19,590	Bolivia/Chile
Cerro Paniri	5,946	19,508	Chile
Licancabur	5,920	19,420	Bolivia/Chile
Miñiques	5,910	19,390	Chile
Cotopaxi	5,897	19,347	Ecuador – second highest in Ecuador
Kilimanjaro	5,895	19,341	Tanzania – highest volcano outside South America; highest peak in Africa
Putana Volcano	5,890	19,320	Bolivia/Chile
Falso Azufre	5,890	19,320	Argentina/Chile
Ollagüe	5,868	19,252	Bolivia/Chile
Taapaca	5,860	19,230	Chile
San José	5,856	19,213	Argentina/Chile
Cerro del Azufre	5,846	19,180	Chile
El Misti	5,822	19,101	Peru
Tutupaca	5,815	19,078	Peru
Tocorpuri	5,808	19,055	Bolivia/Chile
Cayambe	5,790	19,000	Ecuador – third highest in Ecuador; farthest point from Earth's rotational axis
Antisana	5,753	18,875	Ecuador
Peinado	5,740	18,830	Argentina
Linzor	5,680	18,640	Bolivia/Chile
Ubinas	5,672	18,609	Peru – active volcano (2006)
Pichu Pichu	5,664	18,583	Peru
Mount Elbrus	5,642	18,510	Russia – highest volcano in Eurasia; highest peak in Russia
Pico de Orizaba	5,636	18,491	Mexico – highest volcano in North America; highest peak in Mexico
Mount Damavand	5,610	18,410	Iran – highest volcano within Asia; highest peak in Iran
Cerro Toco	5,604	18,386	Chile
Tupungatito	5,603	18,383	Argentina/Chile
Arintica	5,597	18,363	Chile
Lascar Volcano	5,592	18,346	Chile
Isluga	5,550	18,210	Chile
Yucamani	5,550	18,210	Peru
Pampa Luxsar	5,543	18,186	Bolivia
Sara Sara	5,505	18,061	Peru
Tata Sabaya	5,430	17,810	Bolivia
Popocatépetl	5,426	17,802	Mexico – second highest volcano in North America
Ticsani	5,408	17,743	Peru
Pukintika	5,407	17,740	Bolivia/Chile
Nevado del Huila	5,364	17,598	Colombia – highest volcano in Colombia
Nevado del Ruiz	5,321	17,457	Colombia – 23,000 people died in 1985 eruption
El Altar	5,319	17,451	Ecuador
Nevado del Tolima	5,276	17,310	Colombia
Maipo	5,264	17,270	Argentina-Chile
Illiniza	5,248	17,218	Ecuador
Sangay	5,230	17,160	Ecuador
Iztaccíhuatl	5,230	17,160	Mexico – third highest volcano in North America
Mount Kenya	5,199	17,057	Kenya – second highest volcano in Africa; highest mountain in Kenya
Irruputuncu	5,163	16,939	Bolivia/Chile
Mount Ararat	5,137	16,854	Turkey – highest mountain in Turkey
Mount Kazbek	5,047	16,558	Georgia – highest volcano in Georgia
Tungurahua	5,023	16,480	Ecuador
Carihuairazo	5,018	16,463	Ecuador – neighbouring Chimborazo
Mount Bona	5,005	16,421	Alaska – highest volcano in the United States

== Above 4,000 metres ==
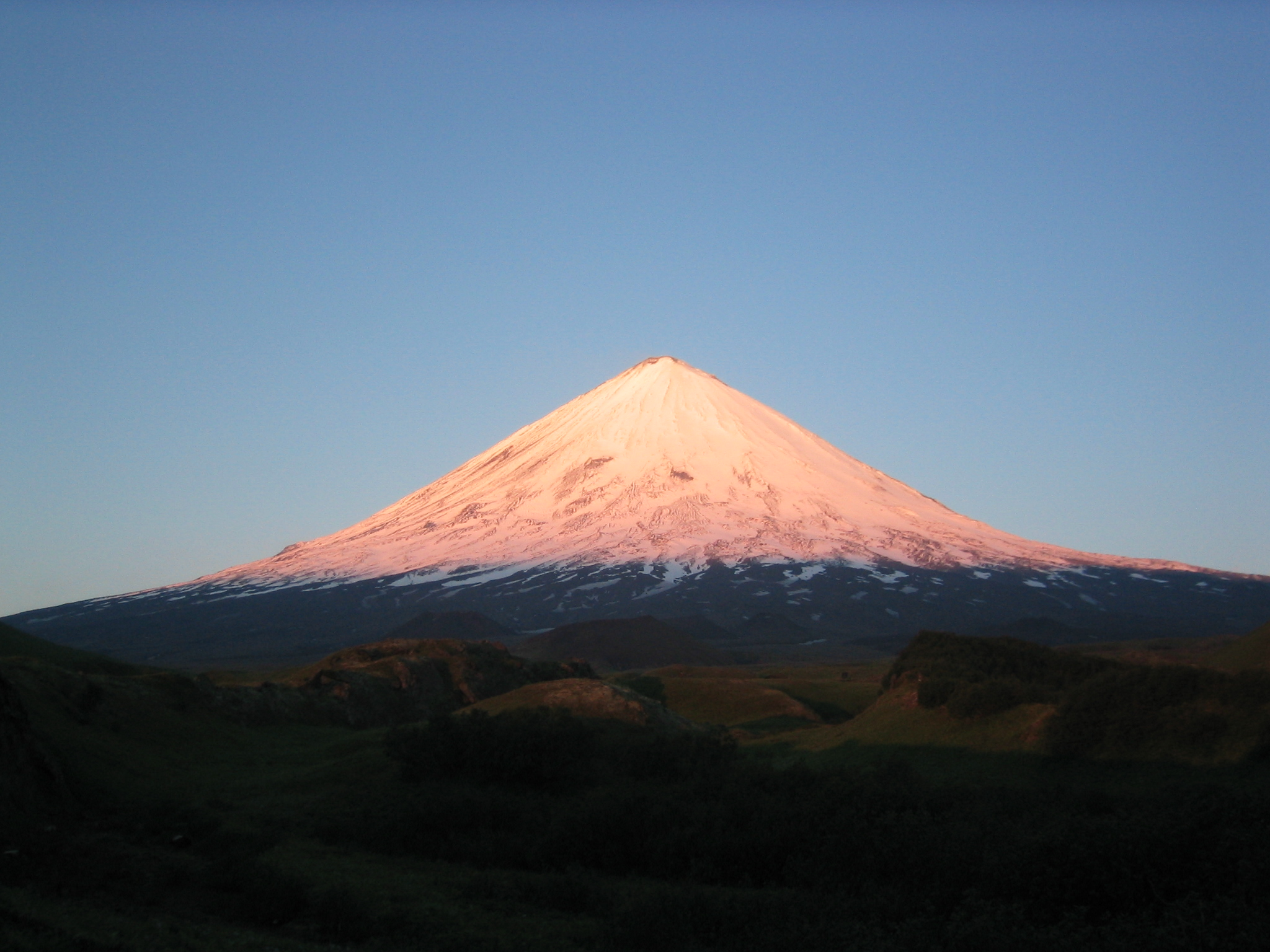
Klyuchevskaya Sopka

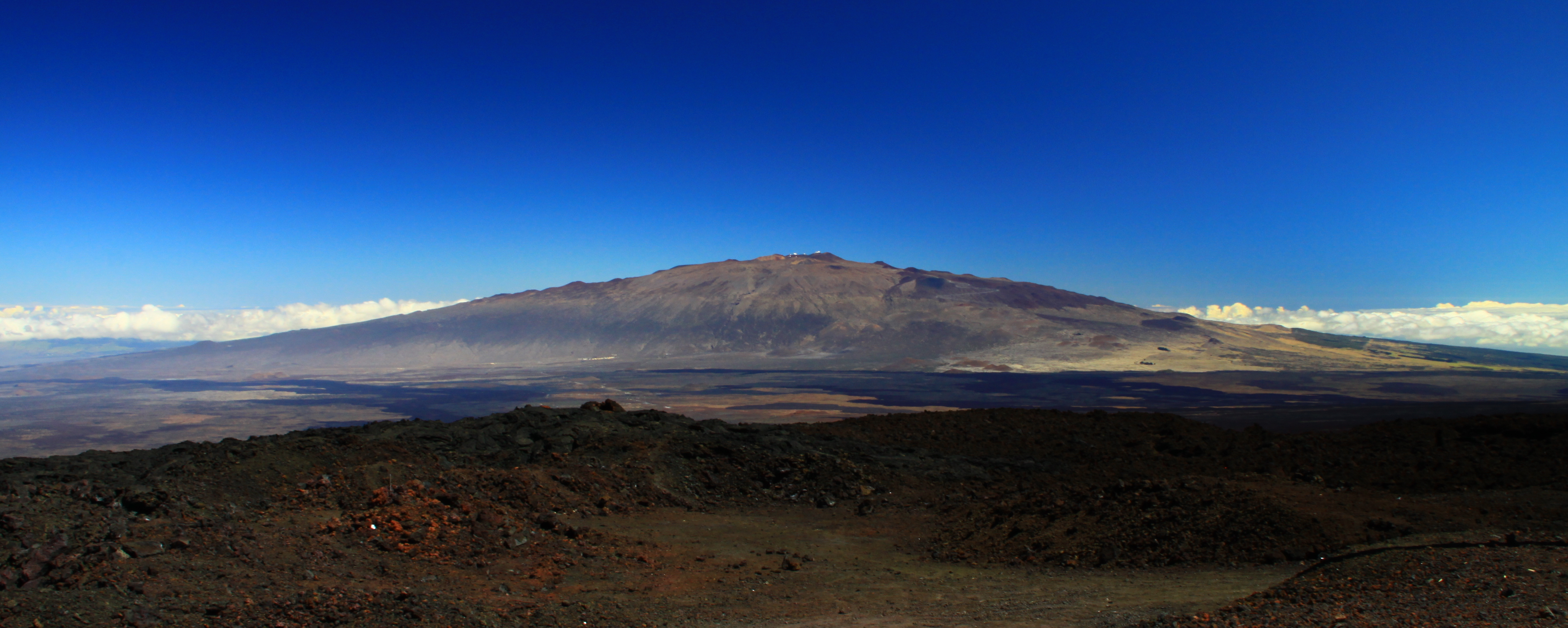
Mauna Kea

Mountain	Metres	Feet	Location and notes
Risco Plateado	4,999	16,401	Argentina
Mount Blackburn	4,996	16,391	Alaska, United States
Santa Isabel	4,950	16,240	Colombia
Mount Sanford	4,949	16,237	Alaska, United States
Palomo	4,860	15,940	Chile
Huaynaputina	4,850	15,910	Peru
Sabalan	4,811	15,784	Iran
Corazón	4,790	15,720	Ecuador
Pichincha Volcano	4,784	15,696	Ecuador
Mount Churchill	4,766	15,636	Alaska, United States
Cumbal Volcano	4,764	15,630	Colombia
Klyuchevskaya Sopka	4,750	15,580	Kamchatka Peninsula, Russia – highest active in Eurasia; highest mountain in Siberia
Rumiñahui	4,721	15,489	Ecuador
Domuyo	4,709	15,449	Argentina
Chiles	4,698	15,413	Colombia/Ecuador
Nevado de Toluca	4,680	15,350	Mexico
Puracé	4,646	15,243	Colombia
Kamen	4,585	15,043	Kamchatka Peninsula, Russia
Sotará	4,580	15,030	Colombia
Mount Meru	4,566	14,980	Tanzania
Imbabura Volcano	4,557	14,951	Ecuador
Mount Karisimbi	4,507	14,787	Rwanda/Democratic Republic of Congo – highest mountain in Rwanda
La Malinche	4,462	14,639	Mexico
Caichinque	4,450	14,600	Chile
Cerro Negro de Mayasquer	4,445	14,583	Colombia/Ecuador
Mount Rainier	4,392	14,409	Washington – highest volcano in contiguous United States
Mount Giluwe	4,368	14,331	Papua New Guinea – highest volcano in Australasia and Pacific islands
Mount Shasta	4,322	14,180	California, United States
Mt Elgon	4,321	14,177	Uganda/Kenya – Borders Kenya, but highest point is in Uganda
Mount Wrangell	4,317	14,163	Alaska, United States
Tinguiririca	4,280	14,040	Chile
Galeras	4,276	14,029	Colombia
Mojanda	4,263	13,986	Ecuador
Volcán Tajumulco	4,220	13,850	Guatemala – highest mountain in Central America
Mauna Kea	4,205	13,796	Hawaii, United States – world's tallest mountain from base to summit
Mount Sidley	4,181	13,717	Antarctica – highest volcano in Antarctica
Las Ánimas	4,175	13,698	Colombia
Mauna Loa	4,169	13,678	Hawaii, United States
Doña Juana	4,137	13,573	Colombia
Mount Muhabura	4,127	13,540	Rwanda/Uganda
Planchón-Peteroa	4,107	13,474	Argentina/Chile
Mount Cameroon	4,095	13,435	Cameroon – highest mountain in Cameroon
Mount Aragats	4,095	13,435	Armenia – highest mountain in Armenia
Volcán Tacaná	4,092	13,425	Guatemala/México
Mount Jarvis	4,091	13,422	Alaska, United States
Azufral	4,070	13,350	Colombia
Petacas	4,054	13,301	Colombia
Antofagasta de la Sierra	4,000	13,000	Argentina
Cerro Bravo	4,000	13,000	Colombia

== Above 3,000 metres ==
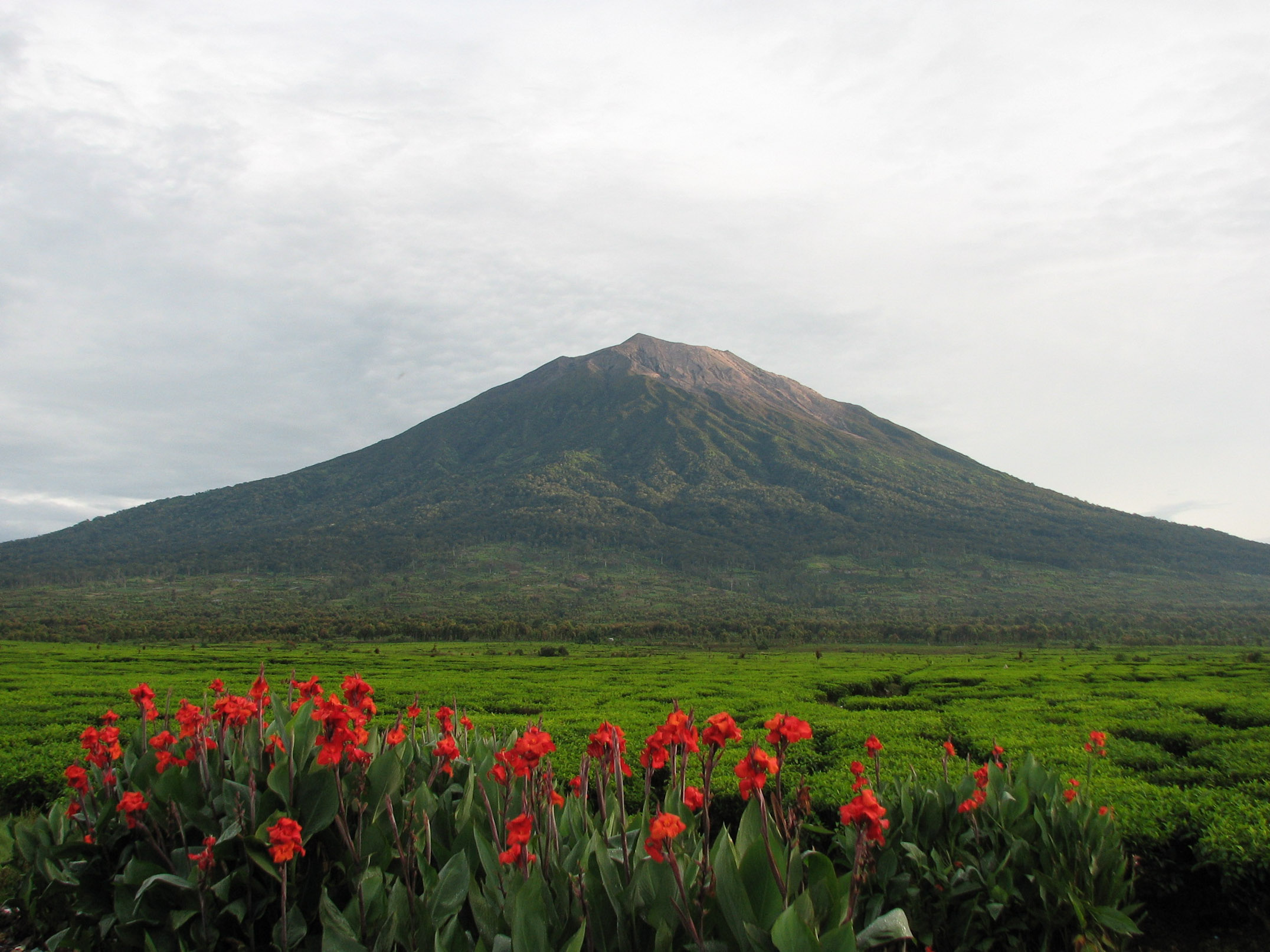
Mount Kerinci

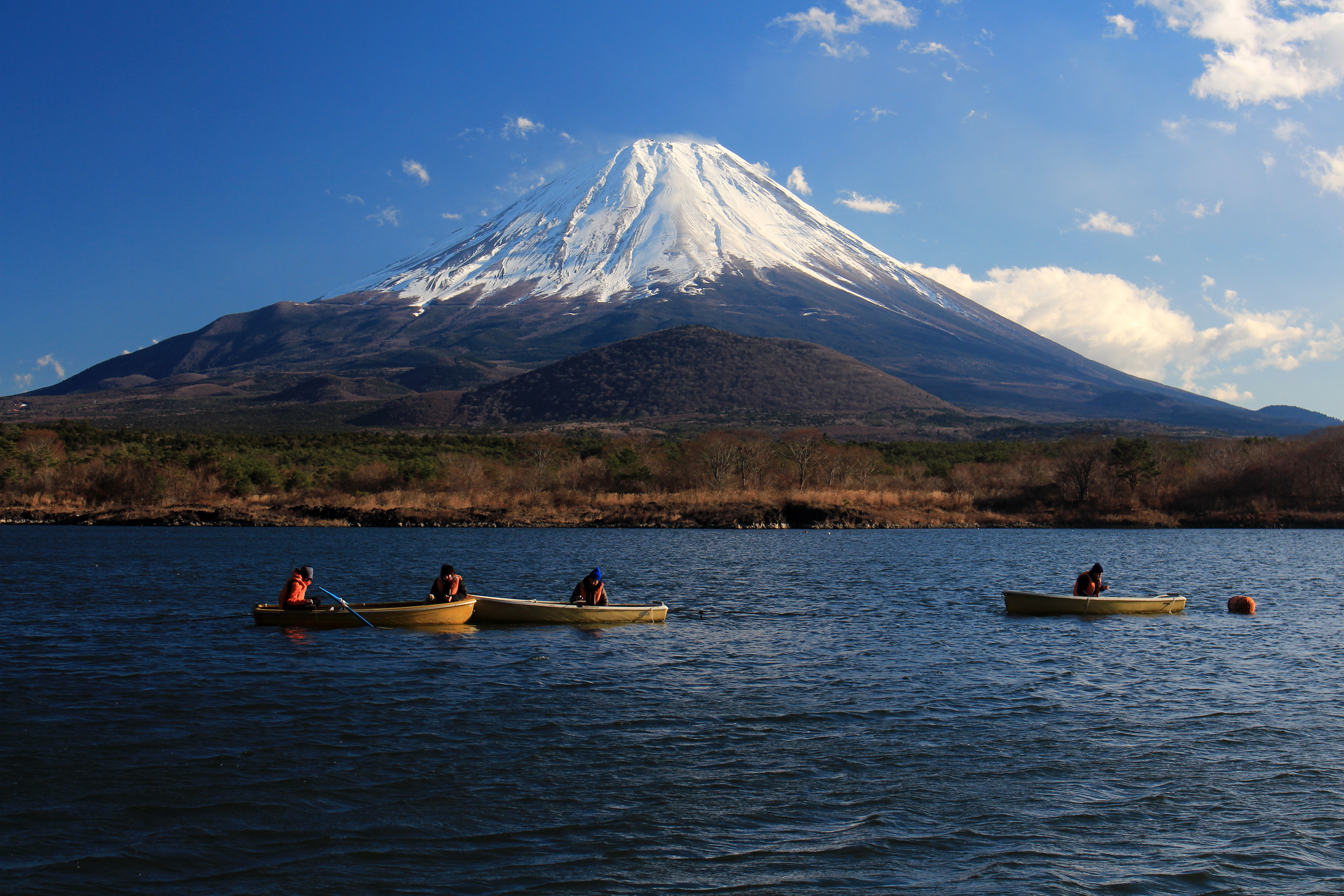
Mount Fuji

Mountain	Metres	Feet	Location and notes
Tromen	3,978	13,051	Argentina
Acatenango	3,976	13,045	Guatemala
Descabezado Grande	3,953	12,969	Chile
Ushkovsky	3,943	12,936	Kamchatka Peninsula, Russia
Taftan	3,940	12,930	Sistan and Baluchestan, Iran
Mount Erciyes	3,916	12,848	Kayseri Province, Turkey
Quilotoa	3,914	12,841	Ecuador
Jocotitlán (volcano)	3,900	12,800	Mexico
Romeral	3,858	12,657	Colombia
Humphreys Peak	3,852	12,638	Arizona, United States
Volcán de Colima	3,820	12,530	Mexico
Mount Kerinci	3,805	12,484	Sumatra, Indonesia – highest volcano in Indonesia; highest mountain in Sumatra
Mount Erebus	3,795	12,451	Antarctica
Cerro Azul	3,788	12,428	Chile
Mount Hagen	3,778	12,395	Papua New Guinea
Mount Fuji	3,776	12,388	Chūbu region, Honshū – highest mountain in Japan
Santa María	3,772	12,375	Guatemala
Volcán de Fuego	3,763	12,346	Guatemala
Volcán de Agua	3,750	12,300	Guatemala
Lanín	3,747	12,293	Argentina/Chile
Mount Adams	3,743	12,280	Washington, United States
Mount Rinjani	3,726	12,224	Lombok, Indonesia – second highest volcano in Indonesia
Teide	3,718	12,198	Tenerife, Canary Islands – highest peak in Atlantic islands and Spain
Sahand	3,707	12,162	East Azerbaijan, Iran
Payun Matru	3,680	12,070	Argentina
Semeru	3,676	12,060	Java, Indonesia – highest mountain in Java
Mount Ostry Tolbachik	3,682	12,080	Kamchatka peninsula, Russia
Mount Drum	3,661	12,011	Alaska, United States
Kabargin Oth Group	3,650	11,980	Georgia
Lautaro	3,607	11,834	Chile
Ghegam Ridge	3,597	11,801	Armenia
Toney Mountain	3,595	11,795	Antarctica
Mount Tendürek	3,584	11,759	Turkey
Reventador	3,562	11,686	Ecuador – active since 2002
Mount Steere	3,558	11,673	Antarctica
Santo Tomas	3,542	11,621	Guatemala
Volcán Atitlán	3,535	11,598	Guatemala
Kronotsky	3,527	11,572	Kamtchatka Peninsula, Russia
Bazman	3,490	11,450	Iran
Mount Berlin	3,478	11,411	Antarctica
Volcán Barú	3,474	11,398	Panama
Mount Nyiragongo	3,470	11,380	Democratic Republic of the Congo
Mount Takahe	3,460	11,350	Antarctica
Koryaksky	3,456	11,339	Kamtchatka Peninsula, Russia
Mount Taylor (New Mexico)	3,446	11,306	New Mexico, United States
Cerro Arenales	3,437	11,276	Chile
Irazú Volcano	3,432	11,260	Costa Rica
Mount Slamet	3,428	11,247	Java, Indonesia
Mount Hood	3,426	11,240	Oregon, United States – highest volcano and mountain
Emi Koussi	3,415	11,204	Chad – highest mountain in Chad and the Sahara
Mount Overlord	3,395	11,138	Antarctica
Mammoth Mountain	3,390	11,120	California, United States
Mount Spurr	3,374	11,070	Alaska, United States
Mount Sumbing	3,371	11,060	Java, Indonesia
Mount Etna	3,369	11,053	Sicily – active; highest volcano in Western Europe; highest peak in Italy south of the Alps
Turrialba Volcano	3,340	10,960	Costa Rica
Arjuno-Welirang	3,339	10,955	Java, Indonesia
Raung	3,332	10,932	Java, Indonesia
Dar-Alages	3,329	10,922	Armenia
Mount Hampton	3,323	10,902	Antarctica
Mount Waesche	3,292	10,801	Antarctica
Mount Baker	3,285	10,778	Washington United States
Toussidé	3,265	10,712	Chad
Mount Lawu	3,265	10,712	Java, Indonesia
Mount Hasan	3,253	10,673	Turkey
Cuicocha	3,246	10,650	Ecuador
Nevado de Longaví	3,242	10,636	Chile
Mount Terror	3,230	10,600	Antarctica
Glacier Peak	3,213	10,541	Washington, United States
Nevados de Chillán	3,212	10,538	Chile
Mount Jefferson	3,199	10,495	Oregon, United States
Almolonga	3,197	10,489	Guatemala
Vakak Group	3,190	10,470	Afghanistan
Lassen Peak	3,189	10,463	California, United States
Mount Dempo	3,173	10,410	Sumatra, Indonesia
El Jorullo	3,170	10,400	Mexico
Parícutin	3,170	10,400	Mexico
Callaqui	3,164	10,381	Chile
Volcán Tolimán	3,158	10,361	Guatemala
South Sister	3,157	10,358	Oregon, United States
Mount Merbabu	3,145	10,318	Central Java, Indonesia
Mount Sundoro	3,136	10,289	Java, Indonesia
Llaima	3,125	10,253	Chile
Mount Siple	3,110	10,200	Antarctica
Mount Redoubt	3,108	10,197	Alaska, United States
Tarso Voon	3,100	10,200	Tibesti mountains, Chad
Zimina	3,081	10,108	Kamchatka Peninsula, Russia
Mount Ciremai	3,078	10,098	Java, Indonesia
Mount Ellis	3,078	10,098	Antarctica
Piton des Neiges	3,069	10,069	Réunion, Indian Ocean
Mount Ontake	3,067	10,062	Chūbu region, Honshū, Japan
Mount Nyamuragira	3,058	10,033	Democratic Republic of the Congo
Haleakalā	3,055	10,023	Maui, Hawaii – highest peak of Maui
Mount Iliamna	3,053	10,016	Alaska, United States
Pleiades	3,040	9,970	Antarctica
Hayes Volcano	3,034	9,954	Alaska, United States
Mount Agung	3,031	9,944	Bali, Indonesia – highest mountain in Bali
Mount Norikura	3,026	9,928	Chūbu region, Honshū, Japan
San Pedro Mountain	3,020	9,910	Guatemala
Pico Basilé	3,011	9,879	Bioko, Equatorial Guinea – highest mountain in Equatorial Guinea
Royal Society Volcano	3,000	9,800	Antarctica
Tskhouk-Karckar	3,000	9,800	Armenia

== Above 2,000 metres ==
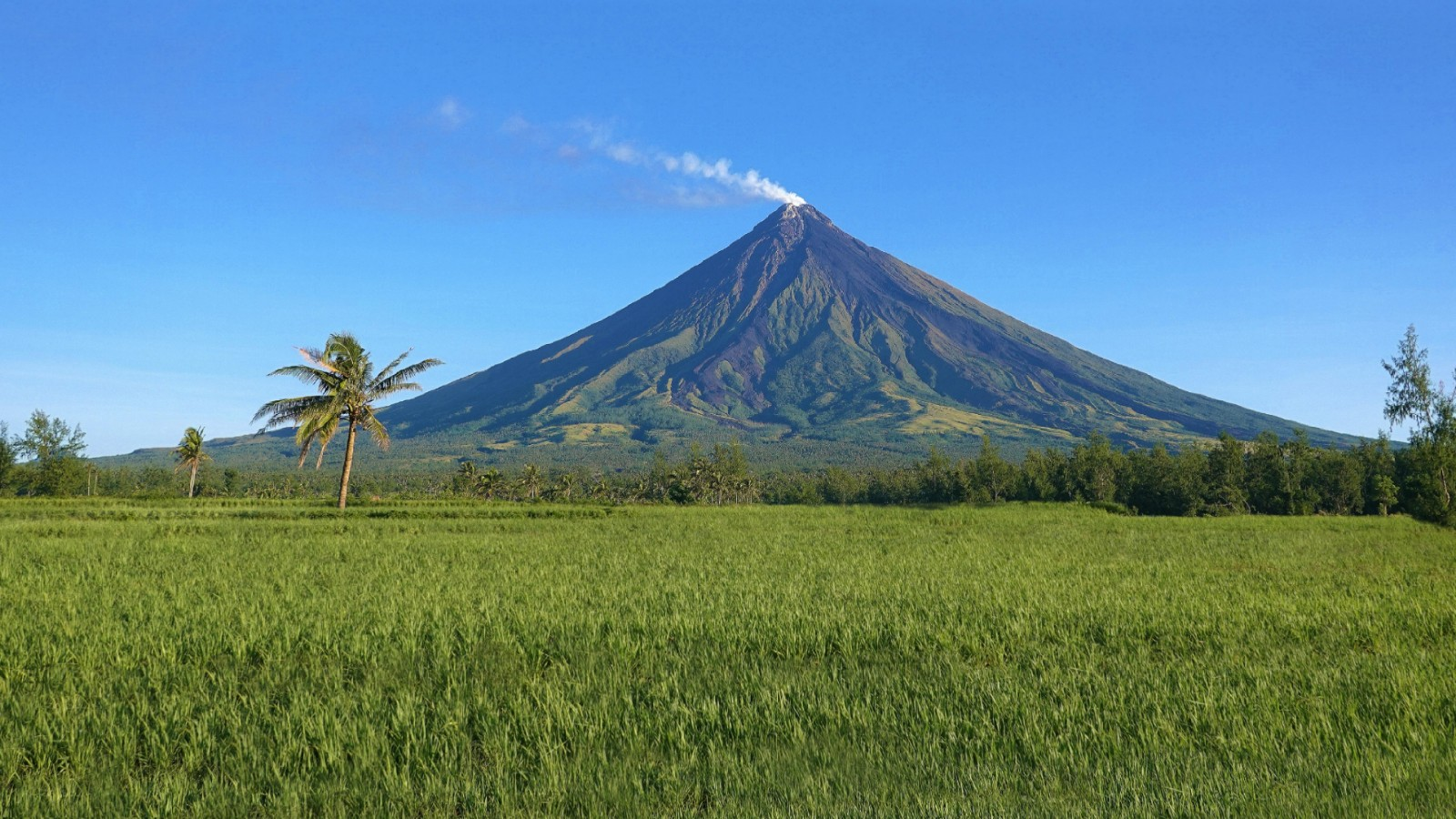
Mayon

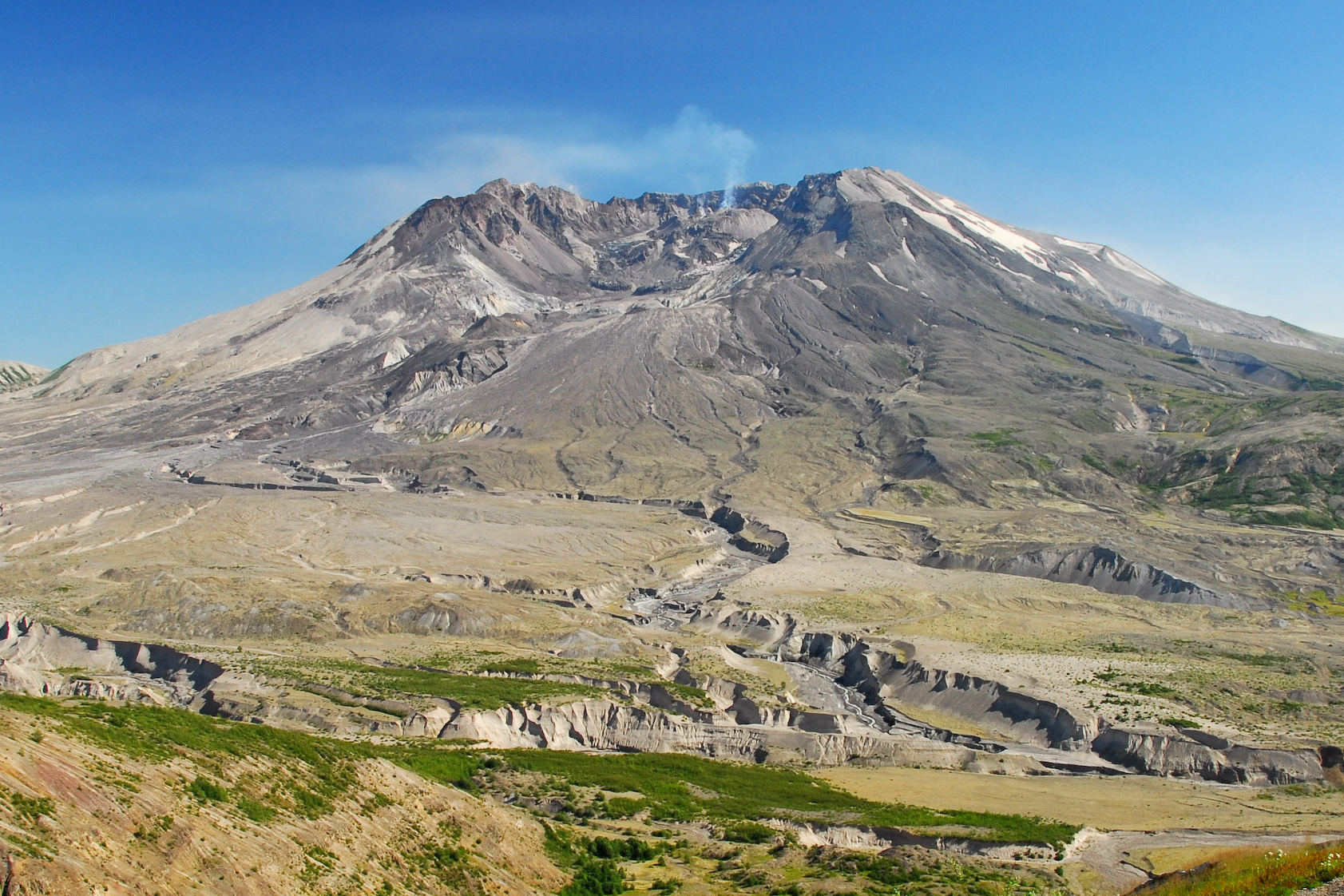
Mount St. Helens

Mountain	Metres	Feet	Location and notes
Copahue	2,997	9,833	Argentina/Chile
Mount Zuqualla	2,989	9,806	Oromia Region – highest volcano in Ethiopia
Antuco	2,979	9,774	Chile
Mount Andrus	2,978	9,770	Antarctica
Tarso Yega	2,972	9,751	Tibesti Mountains, Chad
Mount Gede	2,958	9,705	Java, Indonesia
Mount Apo	2,954	9,692	Mindanao – highest mountain in the Philippines
Udina	2,923	9,590	Kamchatka Peninsula, Russia
Mount Talakmau	2,919	9,577	West Sumatra, Indonesia
Mount Merapi	2,914	9,560	Central Java/Yogyakarta, Indonesia
Chicabal	2,900	9,500	Quetzaltenango department, Guatemala
Mount McLoughlin	2,893	9,491	Oregon, United States
Mount Marapi	2,891	9,485	West Sumatra, Indonesia
Geureudong	2,885	9,465	Sumatra, Indonesia
Pic du Midi d'Ossau	2,884	9,462	French Pyrenees
Bezymianny	2,882	9,455	Kamchatka Peninsula, Russia
Maromokotro	2,876	9,436	Madagascar
Silverthrone Mountain	2,865	9,400	British Columbia – highest volcano in Canada
Lonquimay	2,865	9,400	Chile
Mount Shishaldin (Sisquk)	2,857	9,373	Unimak Island, Alaska – highest mountain in Aleutian Islands
Mount Tambora	2,850	9,350	Lesser Sunda Islands, Indonesia
Villarrica	2,847	9,341	Chile
Mount Fogo	2,829	9,281	Cape Verde
Mount Patah	2,817	9,242	Sumatra, Indonesia
Tolhuaca	2,806	9,206	Chile
Peuët Sagoë	2,801	9,190	Sumatra, Indonesia
Porak	2,800	9,200	Armenia
Ijen	2,799	9,183	Java, Indonesia
Mount Ruapehu	2,797	9,177	North Island – highest volcano in New Zealand
Mount Edziza	2,787	9,144	British Columbia, Canada
Mount Longonot	2,776	9,108	Kenya
Cerro Machín	2,749	9,019	Colombia
Mawson Peak	2,745	9,006	Heard Island – highest mountain in Australia
Baekdu Mountain	2,744	9,003	North Korea/China
Avachinsky	2,741	8,993	Kamchatka Peninsula, Russia
Mount Melbourne	2,732	8,963	Antarctica
Mount Morning	2,723	8,934	Antarctica
Mount Balbi	2,715	8,907	Bougainville, Papua New Guinea
Poás Volcano	2,708	8,885	Costa Rica
Mount Murphy	2,703	8,868	Antarctica
Mount Haku	2,702	8,865	Chūbu region, Honshū, Japan
Mount Discovery	2,681	8,796	Antarctica
Mount Meager massif	2,680	8,790	British Columbia, Canada
Mount Garibaldi	2,678	8,786	British Columbia, Canada
Mount Papandayan	2,665	8,743	Java, Indonesia
Osorno	2,652	8,701	Chile
Piton de la Fournaise	2,631	8,632	Réunion, Indian Ocean
Mount Kendang	2,608	8,556	Java, Indonesia
Alney-Chashakondzha	2,598	8,524	Kamchatka Peninsula, Russia
Mount Talang	2,597	8,520	Sumatra, Indonesia
Gamchen	2,576	8,451	Kamchatka Peninsula, Russia
Tarso Toon	2,575	8,448	Tibesti mountains, Chad
Mount Asama	2,568	8,425	Honshū, Japan
Dieng Volcanic Complex	2,565	8,415	Java, Indonesia
Mount Wilis	2,563	8,409	Java, Indonesia
Sierra Nevada	2,554	8,379	Chile
Pacaya	2,552	8,373	Guatemala
Ostry	2,552	8,373	Kamchatka Peninsula, Russia
Mount St. Helens	2,550	8,370	Washington, United States
Aguilera	2,546	8,353	Chile
Shishel	2,525	8,284	Kamchatka Peninsula, Russia
Mount Taranaki/Egmont	2,518	8,261	North Island, New Zealand
Mount Pavlof	2,515	8,251	Aleutian Range, Alaska Peninsula
Mount Sumbing	2,507	8,225	Sumatra, Indonesia
Bridge River Cones	2,500	8,200	British Columbia, Canada
Mount Nantai	2,486	8,156	Honshū, Japan
Mount Mazama	2,486	8,156	Oregon, United States
Rainbow Range	2,478	8,130	British Columbia, Canada
Bukit Daun	2,467	8,094	Sumatra, Indonesia
Mayon Volcano	2,463	8,081	Albay, Philippines
Kanlaon Volcano	2,435	7,989	Negros, Philippines
Sinabung	2,460	8,070	Sumatra, Indonesia
Mount Yake	2,455	8,054	Chūbu region, Honshū, Japan
Mount Tandikat	2,438	7,999	West Sumatra, Indonesia
Mount Patuha	2,434	7,986	Java, Indonesia
Spectrum Range	2,430	7,970	British Columbia, Canada
Roque de los Muchachos	2,426	7,959	La Palma, Islas Canarias, España
Mocho-Choshuenco	2,415	7,923	Los Ríos Region, Chile
Ilgachuz Range	2,410	7,910	British Columbia, Canada
Michinmahuida	2,404	7,887	Chile
Melimoyu	2,400	7,900	Chile
Mount Cayley	2,394	7,854	British Columbia, Canada
Santa Ana Volcano	2,381	7,812	El Salvador
Kizimen	2,376	7,795	Kamchatka Peninsula, Russia
Itcha Range	2,368	7,769	British Columbia, Canada
Mount Karthala	2,361	7,746	Comoros, Indian Ocean
Mount Suswa	2,356	7,730	Kenya
Taunshits	2,353	7,720	Kamchatka Peninsula, Russia
Pico	2,351	7,713	Azores – highest mountain in Portugal
Quetrupillán	2,350	7,710	Chile
Mount Malabar	2,343	7,687	Java, Indonesia
Ulawun	2,334	7,657	New Britain, Papua New Guinea – highest mountain in the Bismarck Archipelago
Mount Bromo	2,329	7,641	Java, Indonesia
Mutnovsky	2,322	7,618	Kamchatka Peninsula, Russia
The Black Tusk	2,319	7,608	British Columbia, Canada
Corcovado	2,300	7,500	Chile
Ngauruhoe	2,291	7,516	North Island, New Zealand
Daisetsuzan Volcanic Group	2,290	7,510	Hokkaidō, Japan
Dzenzursky	2,285	7,497	Kamchatka Peninsula, Russia
Sollipulli	2,282	7,487	Chile
Menengai	2,278	7,474	Kenya
Bakening	2,278	7,474	Kamchatka Peninsula, Russia
Beerenberg	2,277	7,470	Jan Mayen, Norway – highest volcano in Norway
San Carlos	2,261	7,418	Island of Bioko, Equatorial Guinea
Black Dome Mountain	2,252	7,388	British Columbia, Canada
Mount Guntur	2,249	7,379	West Java, Indonesia
Mount Kembar	2,245	7,365	Sumatra, Indonesia
Inierie	2,245	7,365	Flores Island, Indonesia
Puyehue	2,236	7,336	Chile
Nabro	2,218	7,277	Northern Red Sea, Eritrea
Sibayak	2,212	7,257	Sumatra, Indonesia
Mount Salak	2,211	7,254	Java, Indonesia
Talagabodas	2,201	7,221	Java, Indonesia
Level Mountain	2,190	7,190	British Columbia, Canada
Yate	2,187	7,175	Chile
San Vicente	2,182	7,159	El Salvador
Wayang-Windu	2,182	7,159	Java, Indonesia
Vilyuchik	2,173	7,129	Kamchatka Peninsula, Russia
Mount Kusatsu-Shirane	2,171	7,123	Honshū, Japan
Snegovoy	2,169	7,116	Kamchatka Peninsula, Russia.
Galunggung	2,168	7,113	Java, Indonesia
Vysoky	2,161	7,090	Kamchatka Peninsuala, Russia
Mount Banahaw	2,158	7,080	Luzon, Philippines
Kambalny	2,156	7,073	Kamchatka Peninsula, Russia
Mount Kunyit	2,151	7,057	Sumatra, Indonesia
Sorikmarapi	2,145	7,037	Sumatra, Indonesia
Mount Fee	2,134	7,001	British Columbia, Canada
San Miguel	2,130	6,990	San Miguel Department, El Salvador
Ash Mountain	2,125	6,972	British Columbia, Canada
Öræfajökull	2,110	6,920	Iceland – highest mountain in Iceland
K'iyán Mountain	2,107	6,913	British Columbia, Canada
Ranakah	2,100	6,900	Flores Island, Indonesia
Ebulobo	2,096	6,877	Flores Island, Indonesia
Khodutka	2,090	6,860	Kamchatka Peninsula, Russia
Tangkuban Perahu	2,084	6,837	West Java, Indonesia
Bukit Lumut Balai	2,055	6,742	Sumatra, Indonesia
Mount Price	2,052	6,732	British Columbia, Canada
Mount Ungaran	2,050	6,730	Java, Indonesia
Mount Katmai	2,047	6,716	Alaska, United States
Yanteles	2,042	6,699	Chile
Mount Nipesotsu	2,013	6,604	Hokkaidō, Japan
Heart Peaks	2,012	6,601	British Columbia, Canada
San Joaquin	2,009	6,591	island of Bioko, Equatorial Guinea
Mount Fentale	2,007	6,585	Oromia Region, Ethiopia
Bárðarbunga	2,005	6,578	Iceland
Tarso Toh	2,000	6,600	Chad
Khangar	2,000	6,600	Kamchatka Peninsula, Russia

== Above 1,000 metres ==
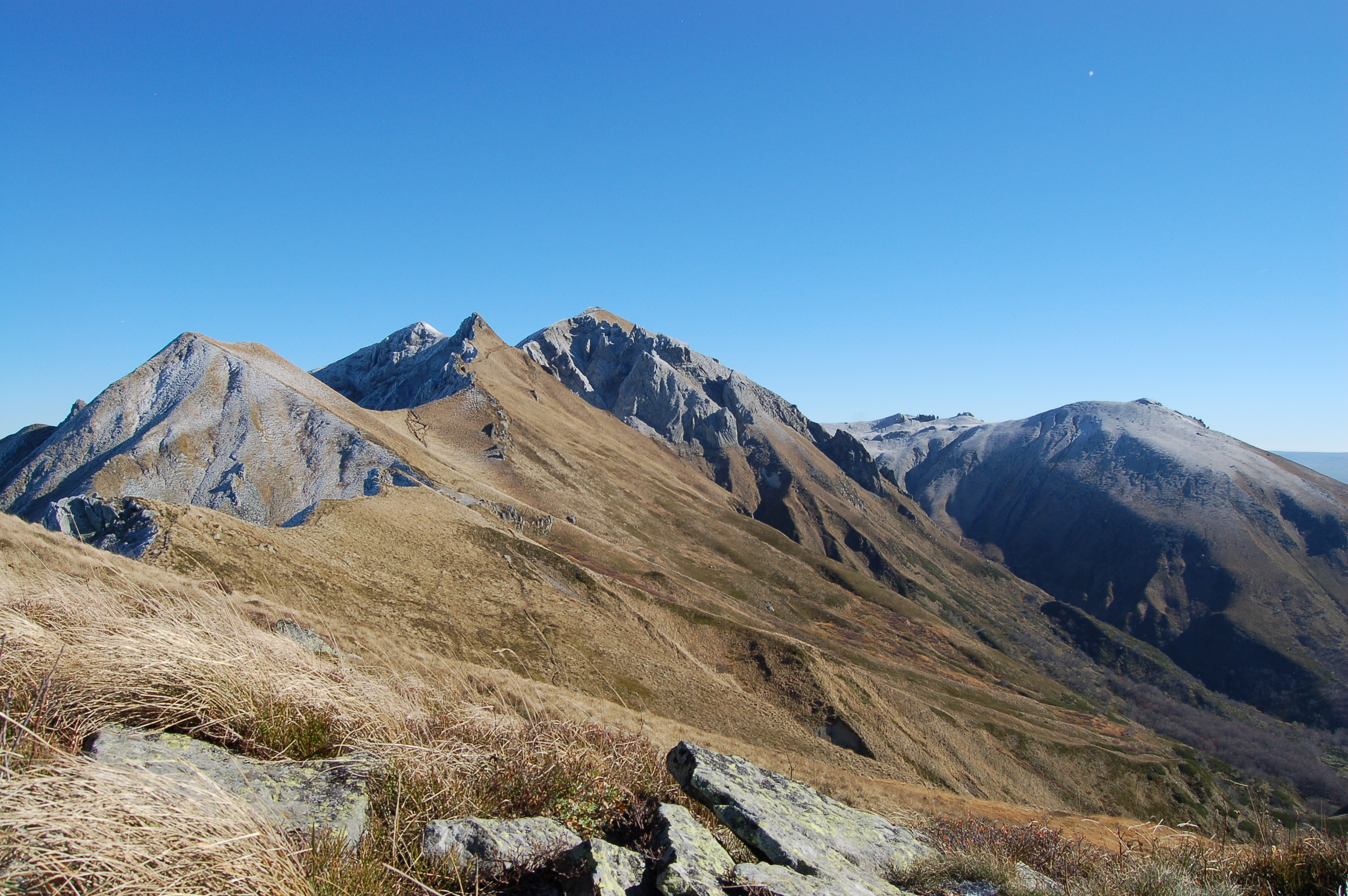
Puy de Sancy

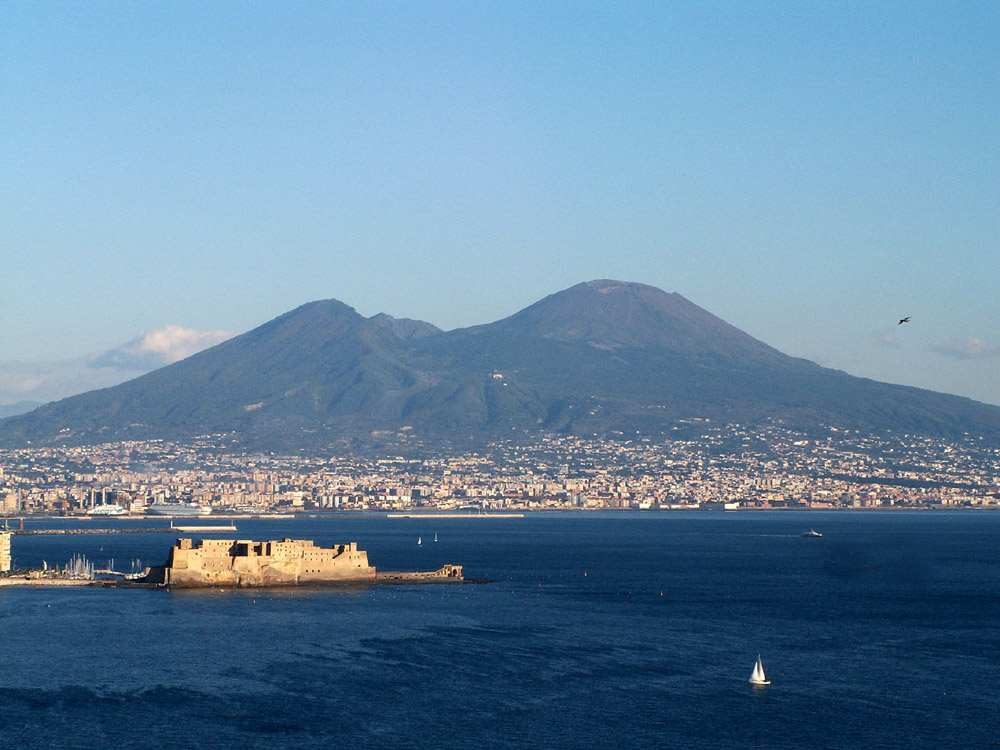
Mount Vesuvius

Mountain	Metres	Feet	Location and notes
Mount Klabat	1,995	6,545	North Sulawesi, Indonesia
Gedamsa Caldera	1,984	6,509	Ethiopia
Mount Tongariro	1,978	6,490	New Zealand
Akhtang	1,956	6,417	Kamchatka Peninsula, Russia
Mount Kaba	1,952	6,404	Sumatra, Indonesia
Izalco	1,950	6,400	El Salvador
Sangeang Api	1,949	6,394	Lesser Sunda Islands, Indonesia
Hallasan	1,947	6,388	Jeju Island, South Korea
Rincón de la Vieja Volcano	1,916	6,286	Costa Rica
Mount Yōtei	1,898	6,227	Hokkaidō, Japan
Puy de Sancy	1,886	6,188	Massif Central, France
Mallahle	1,875	6,152	Eritrea and Ethiopia
Gorely	1,829	6,001	Kamchatka Peninsula, Russia
Seulawah Agam	1,810	5,940	Sumatra, Indonesia
Soputan	1,785	5,856	Sulawesi, Indonesia
Karangetang	1,784	5,853	Siau Island, Indonesia
Mount Karang	1,778	5,833	Banten, Indonesia
Chingo	1,775	5,823	Guatemala/ El Salvador
San Cristobal	1,745	5,725	Chinandega, Nicaragua
Ma Alalta	1,745	5,725	Ethiopia
Adwa	1,733	5,686	Ethiopia
Kelud	1,731	5,679	Java, Indonesia
Laki	1,725	5,659	Iceland
Mount Batur	1,717	5,633	Bali, Indonesia
Mount Gamalama	1,715	5,627	Maluku Islands, Indonesia
Volcán Wolf	1,707	5,600	Galapagos Islands, Ecuador
Lewotobi	1,703	5,587	Lesser Sunda Islands, Indonesia
Mount Kirishima	1,700	5,600	Kyushu, Japan
Concepción	1,700	5,600	Nicaragua
Taungthonton Volcano	1,680	5,510	Myanmar
Arenal Volcano	1,670	5,480	Costa Rica
Mount Egon	1,661	5,449	Lesser Sunda Islands, Indonesia
Iliboleng	1,659	5,443	Lesser Sunda Islands, Indonesia
Mount Lamongan	1,651	5,417	Java, Indonesia
Kelimutu	1,639	5,377	Lesser Sunda Islands
Kone	1,619	5,312	Ethiopia
Sork Ale	1,611	5,285	Ethiopia
Mount Aso	1,592	5,223	Kyushu, Japan
Mount Lokon	1,580	5,180	Sulawesi, Indonesia
Inielika	1,559	5,115	Lesser Sunda Islands, Indonesia
Mount Bulusan	1,565	5,135	Sorsogon, Philippines
Mount Gamkonora	1,560	5,120	Maluku Islands, Indonesia
Karymsky	1,536	5,039	Russia
Mount Popa	1,518	4,980	Myanmar
Mount Pinatubo	1,486	4,875	Philippines
La Grande Soufrière	1,467	4,813	Guadeloupe, Overseas France
Mount Ile Lewotolok	1,423	4,669	Lesser Sunda Islands, Indonesia
Morne Diablotins	1,447	4,747	Dominica
Shinmoedake	1,421	4,662	Kyushu, Japan
Mount Pelée	1,397	4,583	Martinique, Overseas France
Kie Besi	1,357	4,452	Maluku Islands, Indonesia
Mount Dana (Alaska)	1,354	4,442	Canoe Bay, Alaska Peninsula, United States
Pulosari	1,346	4,416	Banten, Indonesia
Morne Trois Pitons	1,342	4,403	Dominica
Dukono	1,335	4,380	Maluku Islands, Indonesia
Mount Ibu	1,325	4,347	Maluku Islands, Indonesia
Asavyo	1,324	4,344	Ethiopia
Mount Mahawu	1,324	4,344	Sulawesi, Indonesia
Mount Awu	1,320	4,330	Sangihe Islands, Indonesia
Mount Akutan	1,303	4,275	Aleutian Islands, Alaska
Chinameca	1,300	4,300	El Salvador
La Yeguada	1,297	4,255	Veraguas Province, Panama
Momotombo	1,297	4,255	Nicaragua
Mount Pānīʻau	1,289	4,229	Hawaii, United States
Mount Vesuvius	1,281	4,203	Province of Naples, Italy
Mount Baluran	1,247	4,091	East Java - Indonesia
La Soufrière (Saint Vincent)	1,234	4,049	Saint Vincent and the Grenadines
La Yeguada	1,297	4,255	Panama
Conchagua	1,225	4,019	El Salvador
Morne Watt	1,224	4,016	Dominica
Kilauea	1,222	4,009	Hawaii, United States
El Valle	1,185	3,888	Panama
Akademia Nauk	1,180	3,870	Kamchatka Peninsula, Russia
Mount Liamuiga	1,156	3,793	Saint Kitts and Nevis
Leroboleng	1,117	3,665	Flores, Indonesia
Sakurajima	1,117	3,665	Kyushu, Japan
Mount Tangkoko	1,113	3,652	Sulawesi, Indonesia
Mount Tarawera	1,111	3,645	North Island, New Zealand
Leroboleng	1,095	3,593	Lesser Sunda Islands, Indonesia
Telica	1,061	3,481	Nicaragua
Caldeira Volcano	1,043	3,422	Faial Island, Azores, Portugal
Iliwerung	1,018	3,340	Lembata Island, Indonesia
Suwoh	1,000	3,300	Sumatra, Indonesia

== Below 1,000 metres ==
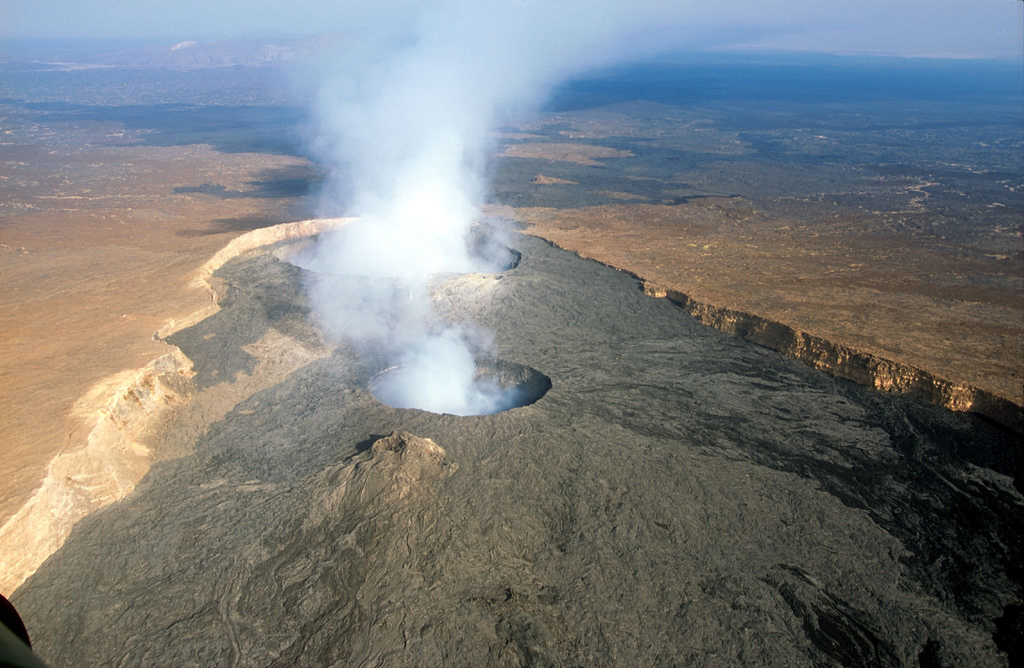
Erta Ale

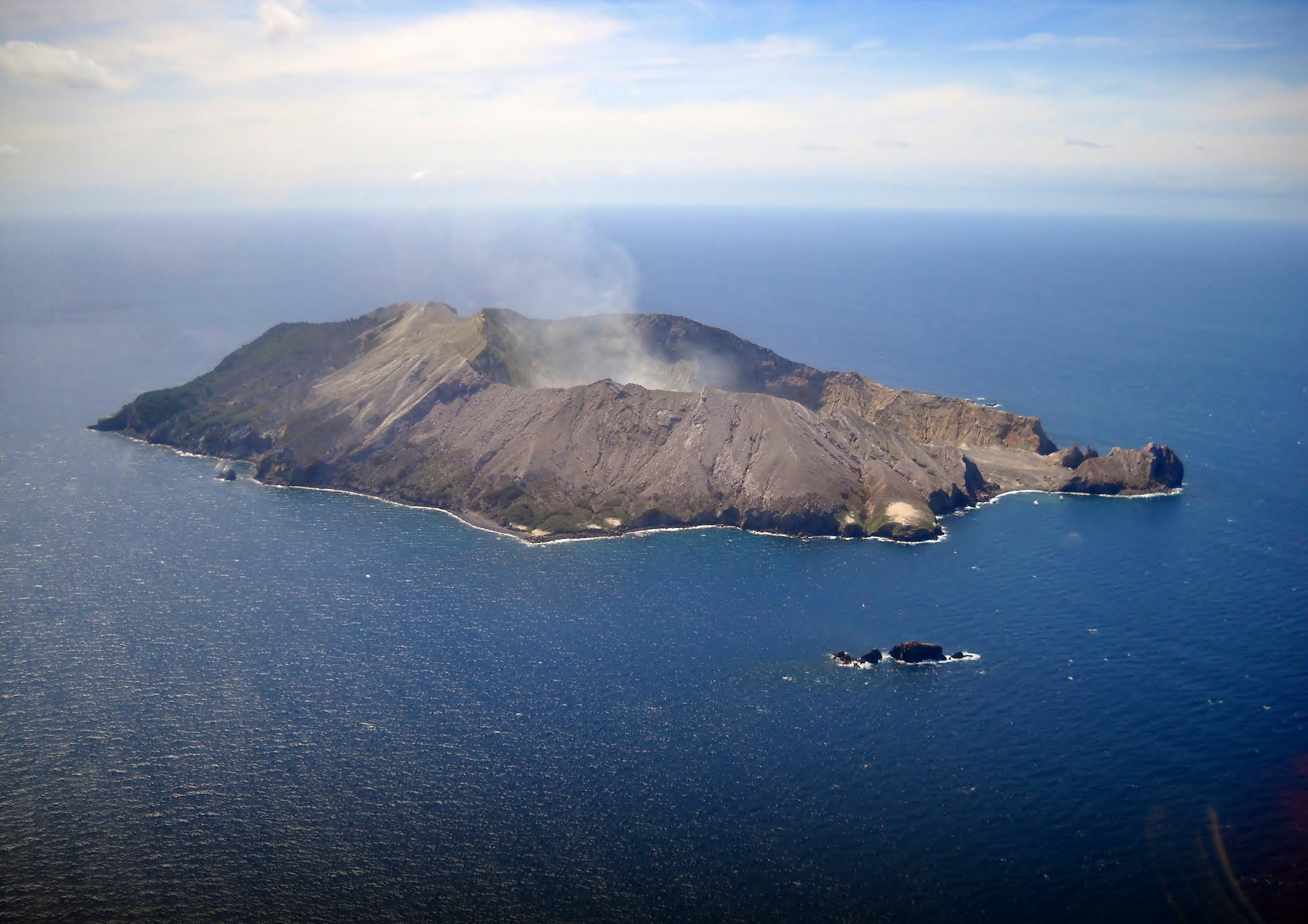
Whakaari / White Island

Mountain	Metres	Feet	Location and notes
Nevis Peak	985	3,232	Saint Kitts and Nevis
Morne Plat Pays	940	3,080	Dominica
Stromboli	924	3,031	Aeolian islands, Italy
Soufriere Hills	915	3,002	Montserrat, British Overseas Territory
Mount Scenery	870	2,850	Saba, Caribbean Netherlands
Paluweh	875	2,871	Lesser Sunda Islands, Indonesia
Mount Wurlali	868	2,848	Banda Arc, Indonesia
Mount Sirung	862	2,828	Lesser Sunda Islands, Indonesia
Morne aux Diables	861	2,825	Dominica
Mount Saint Catherine	840	2,760	Grenada
Krakatoa	813	2,667	Sunda Strait, Indonesia
Mount Nila	781	2,562	Banda Sea, Indonesia
San Diego volcanic field	781	2,562	El Salvador
Qualibou	777	2,549	Saint Lucia
Taupō Volcano	760	2,490	North Island, New Zealand
Mount Batutara	748	2,454	Lesser Sunda Islands, Indonesia
Coatepeque Caldera	746	2,448	El Salvador
Cerro Negro	728	2,388	Nicaragua
Mount Ruang	725	2,379	Sangihe Islands, Indonesia
Narcondam Island	710	2,330	Andaman Islands, India
Pu‘u ‘Ō‘ō	700	2,300	Hawaii, United States
Krafla	650	2,130	Iceland
Banda Api	640	2,100	Banda Arc, Indonesia
Mount Iya	637	2,090	Lesser Sunda Islands, Indonesia
Masaya	635	2,083	Nicaragua
Erta Ale	613	2,011	Ethiopia
The Quill (Mount Mazinga)	601	1,972	Sint Eustatius, Caribbean Netherlands
Trindade and Martim Vaz	600	2,000	South Atlantic Ocean, Brazil
Iliwerung	583	1,913	Lesser Sunda Islands, Indonesia
Golovnin	543	1,781	Russia
Great Etang	530	1,740	Grenada
Baratang Island	532	1,745	Andaman Islands, India
Namyong	508	1,667	Myanmar
Letha Taung	508	1,667	Myanmar
Mount Colo	507	1,663	Gulf of Tomini, Indonesia
Vulcano	501	1,644	Aeolian islands, Italy
Lower Chindwin	385	1,263	Myanmar
Barren Island	354	1,161	Andaman Islands, India
Whakaari / White Island	321	1,053	Bay of Plenty, New Zealand
Taal Volcano	311	1,020	Batangas, Philippines
Anak Krakatoa	288	945	Sunda Strait, Indonesia
Gunungapi Wetar	282	925	Banda Sea, Indonesia
Pali-Aike volcanic field	180	590	Argentina–Chile border region

== Measured from its base on the ocean floor ==
A list (incomplete) of volcanoes on Earth arranged by elevation in meters from its base on the ocean floor.

Volcanoes	Meters
Mauna Kea	10203 meters
Mauna Loa	9170 meters
Haleakalā	9144 metres
Teide	7500 meters
Piton des Neiges	7071 meters (over 8000 meters before its collapse)

== See also ==
- List of mountains by elevation
- Lists of volcanoes
