= Barisan Mountains =

Mountain range in Sumatra, Indonesia

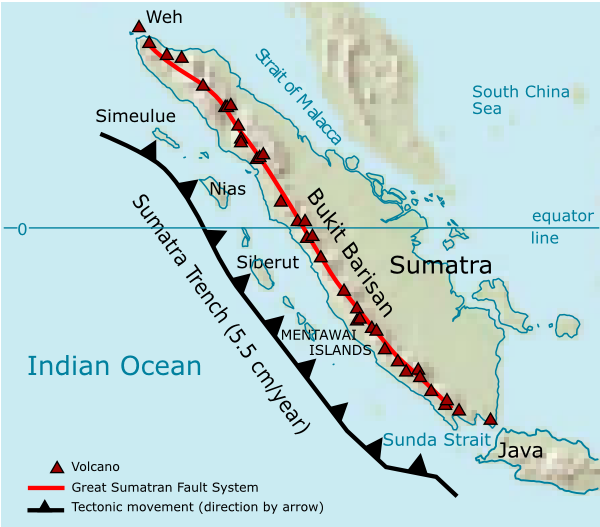
Geological map of Bukit Barisan

The Bukit Barisan or the Barisan Mountains are a mountain range on the western side of Sumatra, Indonesia, covering nearly 1,700 km (1,050 mi) from the north to the south of the island. The Bukit Barisan range consists primarily of volcanoes shrouded in dense jungle cover, including Sumatran tropical pine forests on the higher slopes. The highest peak of the range is Mount Kerinci at 3,800 metres (12,467 ft). The Bukit Barisan Selatan National Park is situated towards the southern end of the range in Liwa, Indonesia.

Much of the mountain range is protected through a network of national parks, including Gunung Leuser, Kerinci Seblat, and Bukit Barisan Selatan. Together, these parks form the UNESCO World Heritage Site Tropical Rainforest Heritage of Sumatra, recognized in 2004 for its exceptional biodiversity and importance as habitat for critically endangered species such as the Sumatran orangutan, Sumatran tiger, and Sumatran rhinoceros.

The name Bukit Barisan actually means "row of hills" or "hills that make a row" in Malay, for the range stretches end to end along the island of Sumatra.

There are 35 active volcanoes in Bukit Barisan. The largest is the supervolcano Toba within the 100 km (62 miles) × 30 km (19 miles) Lake Toba, which was created after a caldera collapse (est. in 74,000 Before Present). The eruption is estimated to have been at level eight on the VEI scale, the largest possible for a volcanic eruption.

== List of volcanoes ==
The following list of active volcanoes in Bukit Barisan is sourced from the Smithsonian Institution's Global Volcanism Program.

| Name | Shape | Elevation | Last eruption (VEI) | Geolocation |
|---|---|---|---|---|
| Weh | stratovolcano | 617 metres (2,024 ft) | Pleistocene | 5.82°N 95.28°E |
| Seulawah Agam | stratovolcano | 1,810 metres (5,940 ft) | 1839 (2) | 5.448°N 95.658°E |
| Peuet Sague | complex volcano | 2,801 metres (9,190 ft) | 25 December 2000 (2) | 4.914°N 96.329°E |
| Geureudong | stratovolcano | 2,885 metres (9,465 ft) | 1937 | 4.813°N 96.82°E |
| Mount Leuser | non-volcanic | 3,466 metres (11,371 ft) | | 3°44′29″N 97°9′18″E |
| Kembar | shield volcano | 2,245 metres (7,365 ft) | Pleistocene | 3.850°N 97.664°E |
| Sibayak | stratovolcano | 2,212 metres (7,257 ft) | 1881 | 3.23°N 98.52°E |
| Sinabung | stratovolcano | 2,460 metres (8,070 ft) | 2 March 2021 | 3.17°N 98.392°E |
| Toba | supervolcano | 2,157 metres (7,077 ft) | cca 75.000 years ago | 2.58°N 98.83°E |
| Helatoba-Tarutung | fumarole field | 1,100 metres (3,600 ft) | Pleistocene | 2.03°N 98.93°E |
| Imun | unknown | 1,505 metres (4,938 ft) | unknown | 2.158°N 98.93°E |
| Sibualbuali | stratovolcano | 1,819 metres (5,968 ft) | unknown | 1.556°N 99.255°E |
| Lubukraya | stratovolcano | 1,862 metres (6,109 ft) | unknown | 1.478°N 99.209°E |
| Sorikmarapi | stratovolcano | 2,145 metres (7,037 ft) | 1986 (1) | 0.686°N 99.539°E |
| Talakmau | complex volcano | 2,919 metres (9,577 ft) | unknown | 0.079°N 99.98°E |
| Sarik-Gajah | volcanic cone | unknown | unknown | 0.008°N 100.20°E |
| Marapi | complex volcano | 2,891 metres (9,485 ft) | 5 August 2004 (2) | 0.381°S 100.473°E |
| Tandikat | stratovolcano | 2,438 metres (7,999 ft) | 1924 (1) | 0.433°S 100.317°E |
| Talang | stratovolcano | 2,597 metres (8,520 ft) | 12 April 2005 (2) | 0.978°S 100.679°E |
| Kerinci | stratovolcano | 3,800 metres (12,500 ft) | 22 June 2004 (2) | 1.697°S 101.264°E |
| Hutapanjang | stratovolcano | 2,021 metres (6,631 ft) | unknown | 2.33°S 101.60°E |
| Sumbing | stratovolcano | 2,507 metres (8,225 ft) | 23 May 1921 (2) | 2.414°S 101.728°E |
| Kunyit | stratovolcano | 2,151 metres (7,057 ft) | unknown | 2.592°S 101.63°E |
| Pendan | unknown | unknown | unknown | 2.82°S 102.02°E |
| Belirang-Beriti | compound | 1,958 metres (6,424 ft) | unknown | 2.82°S 102.18°E |
| Bukit Daun | stratovolcano | 2,467 metres (8,094 ft) | unknown | 3.38°S 102.37°E |
| Kaba | stratovolcano | 1,952 metres (6,404 ft) | 22 August 2000 (1) | 3.52°S 102.62°E |
| Dempo | stratovolcano | 3,173 metres (10,410 ft) | October 1994 (1) | 4.03°S 103.13°E |
| Patah | unknown | 2,817 metres (9,242 ft) | unknown | 4.27°S 103.30°E |
| Bukit Lumut Balai | stratovolcano | 2,055 metres (6,742 ft) | unknown | 4.23°S 103.62°E |
| Besar | stratovolcano | 1,899 metres (6,230 ft) | April 1940 (1) | 4.43°S 103.67°E |
| Suoh | caldera | 1,000 metres (3,300 ft) | 10 July 1933 (4) | 5.25°S 104.27°E |
| Hulubelu | caldera | 1,040 metres (3,410 ft) | 1836 | 5.35°S 104.60°E |
| Rajabasa | stratovolcano | 1,281 metres (4,203 ft) | 1798 | 5.78°S 105.625°E |

== Inactive volcanoes ==
The following list is sourced from the Study Archaeology

| Name | Shape | Elevation | Last eruption (VEI) | Geolocation |
|---|---|---|---|---|
| Mount Pesagi | caldera | 3,262 metres (10,702 ft) | unknown | 1.167°S 101.325°E |
| Sekincau Belirang | caldera | 1,719 metres (5,640 ft) | unknown | 5.12°S 104.32°E |
| Ranau | caldera | 1,881 metres (6,171 ft) | unknown | 4.83°S 103.92°E |

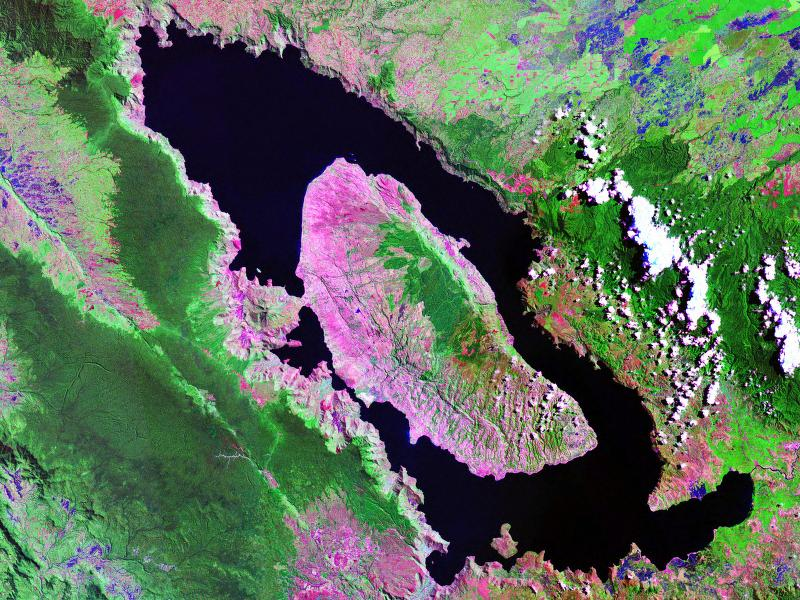
Landsat image of Lake Toba

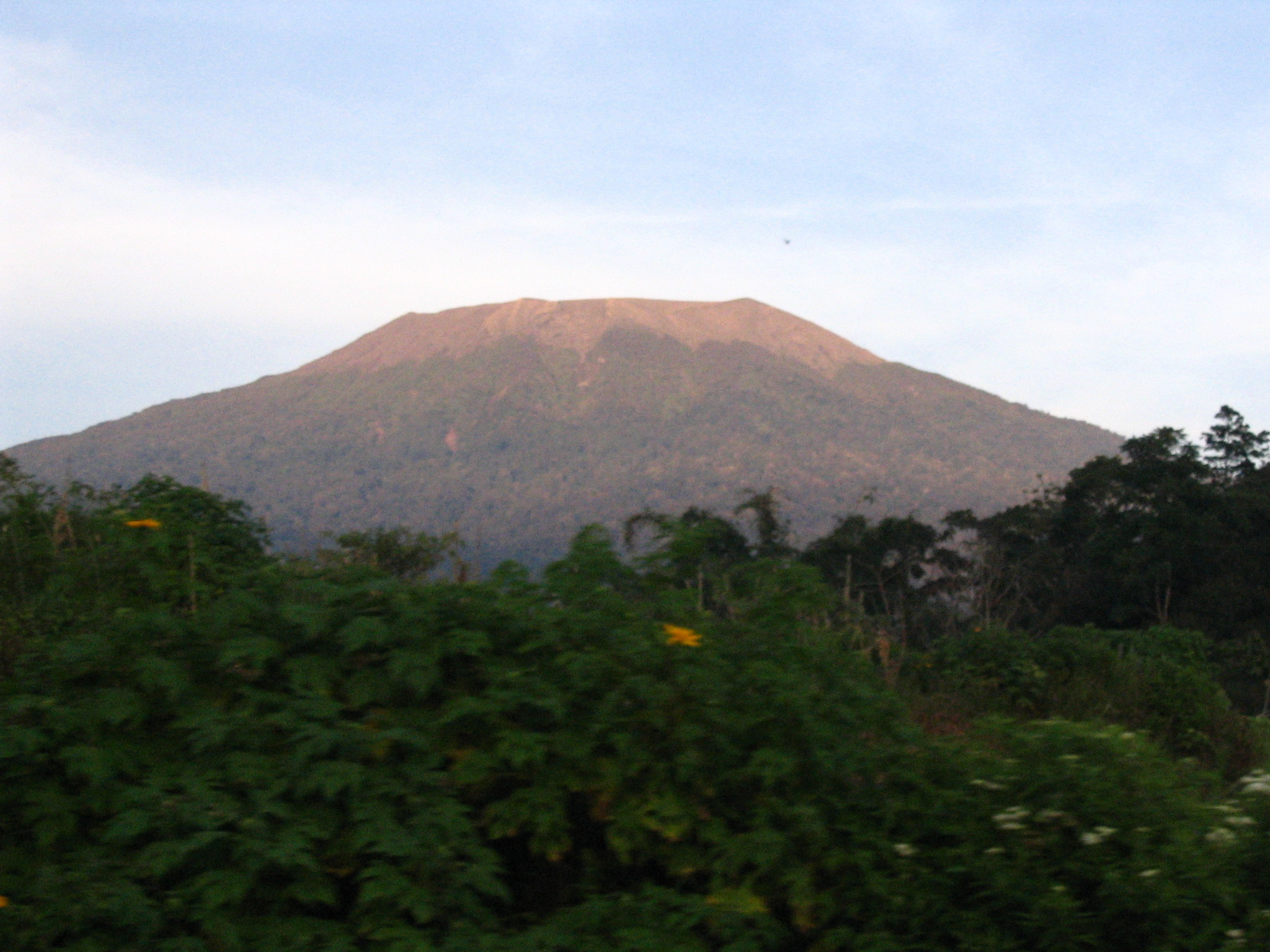
Marapi

== See also ==
- List of volcanoes in Indonesia
- Kodam I/Bukit Barisan
