= Barisan =

Barisan may refer to:

- Barisan Mountains, a mountain range on the island of Sumatra
- Barisan Nasional, a political party coalition in Malaysia
- Barisan Alternatif, a former political coalition in Malaysia
- Barisan Sosialis, a former political party that was split away from the People's Action Party in Singapore
