= Mount Masurai =

Volcano in Sumatra, Indonesia

- Gunung Masurai
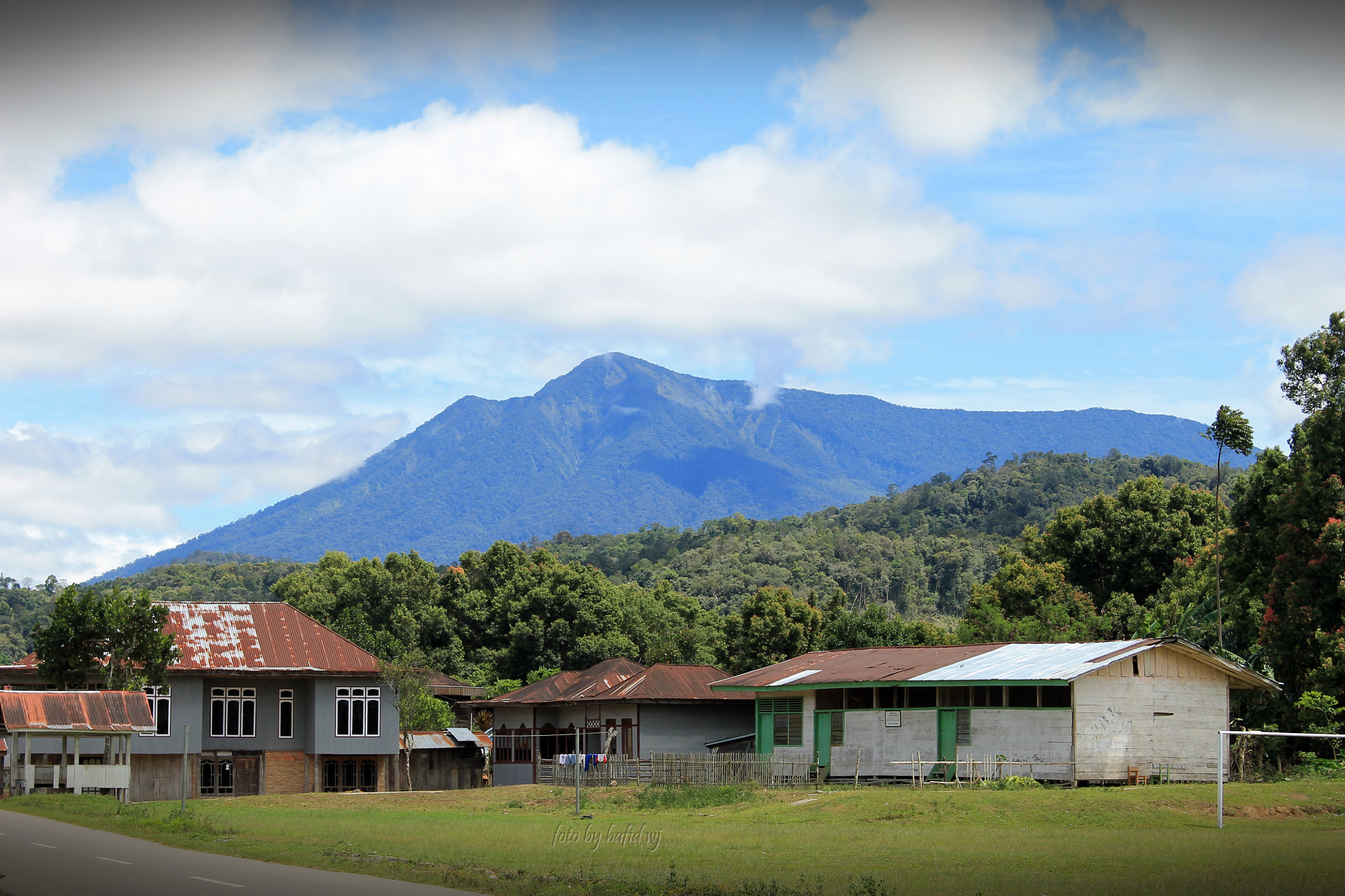
- Masurai as seen from Lubuk Pungguk Village, Jangkat

Highest point
- Elevation: 2,916 m (9,567 ft)
- Prominence: 2,916 m (9,567 ft)
- Listing: Ultra; Ribu
- Coordinates: 02°30′09″S 101°51′30″E

Geography
- Location within Sumatra
- Location: Sumatra, Indonesia
- Parent range: Barisan Mountains

Geology
- Mountain type: Stratovolcano
- Volcanic arc: Sunda Arc
- Last eruption: Pleistocene

Mount Matsurai, natively known as Gunung Masurai, is a large complex of inactive stratovolcanoes in Jambi, Sumatra, Indonesia. The volcano attains an elevation of 2,916 m (9,567 ft) above sea level.

== Geology ==
Mount Masurai is part of the greater Barisan Mountains, which formed due to offshore subduction of the Indo-Australian Plate beneath the Sunda Plate along the Sunda megathrust. The volcanic comples is situated in the Sungai Penuh pull-apart basin; caused by offsets along two segments of the Great Sumatran fault. In the southern section of the basin, closer to Mount Masurai, the basin becomes wider.

Mount Matsurai contains two crater lakes; Kumbang Lake and Merbuk Lake; near the summit cone. The summit cone occupies the western remnant of a half-caldera, 7 km in diameter. The rim of the half-caldera is at an altitude of 2,000 m (6,600 ft)–2,250 m (7,380 ft). A third lake, Blue Lake, located in the caldera, is thought to be remnants of a parasitic eruption; one of many around the area.

== Flora ==
Two species of tropical carnivorous pitcher plants; Nepenthes spathulata and Nepenthes singalana notably overlap each other. The plants, which cannot be definitively assigned to either appear intermediate in form between these two species. It was discovered by botanist Charles Clarke, and written in his monograph Nepenthes of Sumatra and Peninsular Malaysia.

== Climbing ==
Kumbang Lake is a popular feature of the volcano, often visited by climbers on their way to the summit.

== See also ==
- List of ultras of the Malay Archipelago
- List of volcanoes in Indonesia
