= Peperomia parvicaulis =

Scientific classification
- Kingdom: Plantae
- Clade: Tracheophytes
- Clade: Angiosperms
- Clade: Magnoliids
- Order: Piperales
- Family: Piperaceae
- Genus: Peperomia
- Species: P. parvicaulis

Binomial name
- Peperomia parvicaulis C. DC.

Species of flowering plant

Peperomia parvicaulis is a species of epiphyte in the genus Peperomia that is native to Sumatra. It grows on wet tropical biomes. Its conservation status is Threatened.

== Description ==
The type specimen were collected near Mount Dempo, Sumatra, at an elevation of 3,700 ft (1,100 m), as a minute epiphyte on trees.

Peperomia parvicaulis is a tree-dwelling plant with a stem densely and shortly hirsute, rooting at the base, with the spike about 3 cm long, up to 1 mm thick. The leaves are opposite with moderate glabrous petioles; the upper petioles 3 mm long, lower up to 12 mm; the blade is obovate from a cuneate base, puberulous above, ciliolate on the margin, glabrous and black-punctulate beneath, 3-nerved; the uppermost leaves are unequal, 9–10 mm long and 4–5 mm wide; subsequent leaves up to 14 mm long and 12 mm wide; lower leaves up to 30 mm long and 20 mm wide. The peduncles are terminal, glabrous, up to 16 mm long, much exceeding the petioles. The spikes are glabrous, longer than the upper leaves, densely flowered, 25 mm long and 0.5 mm thick when bearing fruit. The bract has an orbicular pelt, pedicellate at the center, 0.5 mm in diameter, sprinkled with red glands like the stamens and ovary. The stamens nearly equal the filament. The ovary is emergent, turbinate, bearing a stigma at the very apex; the stigma is glabrous. The berry is globose, roughened with glands, sessile, 0.4 mm in diameter.

== Taxonomy and naming ==
It was described in 1920 by Casimir de Candolle in the Annuaire du Conservatoire et du Jardin botaniques de Genève, from specimens collected by Henry Ogg Forbes. The epithet parvicaulis refers to the small stem.

== Distribution and habitat ==
It is native to Sumatra. It grows as a epiphyte and is a herb. It grows on wet tropical biomes.

== Conservation ==
This species is assessed as Threatened, in a preliminary report.
