= Moncong Lompobattang =

- Location within Sulawesi

Highest point
- Elevation: 2,874 m (9,429 ft)
- Prominence: 2,857 m (9,373 ft); Ranked 116th
- Listing: Ultra; Ribu
- Coordinates: 05°20′48″S 119°55′54″E

Geography
- Location: Sulawesi, Indonesia

Climbing
- First ascent: 1840 by James Brooke
- Easiest route: Long hike

Moncong Lompobattang is a mountain in Indonesia with an elevation of 2,874 m. Moncong Lompobattang is ranked 116th in the world by topographic prominence.

There is a small antenna compound at the summit of Moncong Lompobattang, along with a triangular pillar and a boulder with the names previous climbers written on it. One kilometre north of the summit lies a slightly lower sub-peak known as Puncak Ko’bang (2,870 m) which is the alleged site of the tomb of a King of Gowa. The two peaks, including the entire mountain and its surrounding area, are considered spiritually significant among local people.

== See also ==
- List of ultras of the Malay Archipelago
