= Buyu Balease =

Mountain in Indonesia

- Location within Indonesia

Highest point
- Elevation: 3,016 m (9,895 ft)
- Prominence: 1,588 m (5,210 ft)
- Listing: Ultra; Ribu
- Coordinates: 2°24′24.8″S 120°32′31.6″E

Geography
- Location: Sulawesi, Indonesia

Geology
- Mountain type: Mountain

Buyu Balease (also known as Baliase, or Gunung Baleaseis) is a mountain on Sulawesi island, located north-east of Palopo city, in South Sulawesi, Indonesia.

== See also ==
- List of volcanoes in Indonesia
- List of ultras of the Malay Archipelago
