= List of ultras of the Malay Archipelago =

This is a list of ultra prominent peaks (with topographic prominence greater than 1,500 metres) in the Malay Archipelago, a group of over 25,000 islands which includes Brunei, Singapore, East Malaysia, Indonesia, the Philippines and East Timor. However, this list excludes ultras in the Philippines which are listed separately.

== Sumatra ==
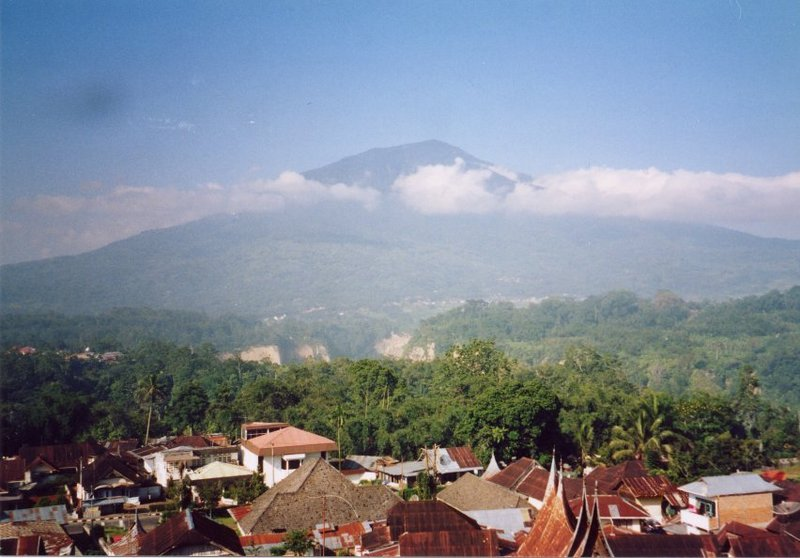
Mount Singgalang, Indonesia

No	Peak	Country	Elevation	Prominence	Col
1	Mount Kerinci	Indonesia (Sumatra)	3,805 m 12,484 ft	3,805 m 12,484 ft	0
2	Mount Leuser	Indonesia (Sumatra)	3,466 m 11,371 ft	2,891 m 9,485 ft	525
3	Mount Dempo	Indonesia (Sumatra)	3,159 m 10,364 ft	2,446 m 8,025 ft	713
4	Mount Ophir	Indonesia (Sumatra)	2,912 m 9,554 ft	2,324 m 7,625 ft	588
5	Mount Marapi	Indonesia (Sumatra)	2,891 m 9,485 ft	2,116 m 6,942 ft	775
6	Bukit Mugajah	Indonesia (Sumatra)	3,079 m 10,102 ft	1,805 m 5,922 ft	1274
7	Mount Sibuatan	Indonesia (Sumatra)	2,457 m 8,061 ft	1,802 m 5,912 ft	655
8	Mount Masurai	Indonesia (Sumatra)	2,933 m 9,623 ft	1,791 m 5,876 ft	1142
9	Mount Singgalang	Indonesia (Sumatra)	2,877 m 9,439 ft	1,727 m 5,666 ft	1150
10	Gle Hulumasen	Indonesia (Sumatra)	2,310 m 7,580 ft	1,720 m 5,640 ft	590
11	Mount Bandahara	Indonesia (Sumatra)	3,012 m 9,882 ft	1,644 m 5,394 ft	1368
12	Mount Patah	Indonesia (Sumatra)	2,850 m 9,350 ft	1,635 m 5,364 ft	1215
13	Seulawah Agam	Indonesia (Sumatra)	1,810 m 5,940 ft	1,610 m 5,280 ft	200
14	Geureudong	Indonesia (Sumatra)	2,880 m 9,450 ft	1,546 m 5,072 ft	1334
15	Bukit Daun	Indonesia (Sumatra)	2,493 m 8,179 ft	1,541 m 5,056 ft	952

== Java ==
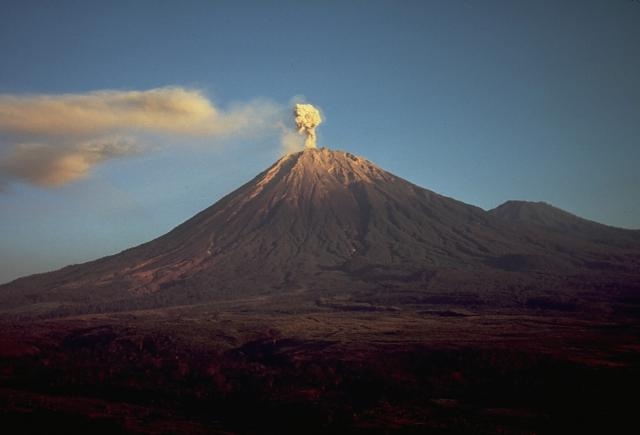
Semeru, Indonesia

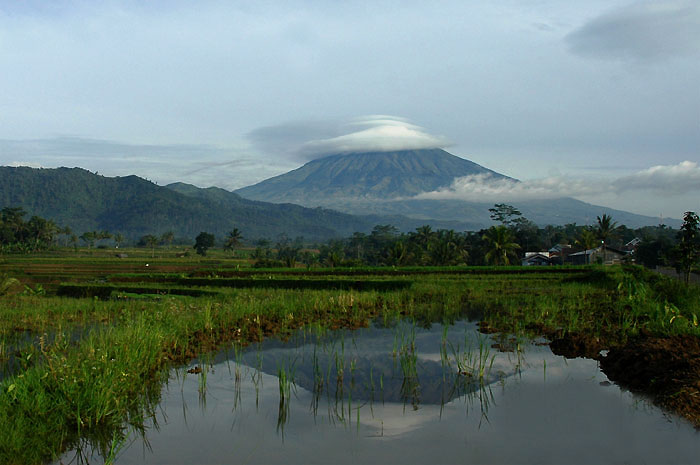
Mount Sumbing, Indonesia

No	Peak	Country	Elevation	Prominence	Col
1	Semeru	Indonesia (Java)	3,676 m 12,060 ft	3,676 m 12,060 ft	0
2	Mount Slamet	Indonesia (Java)	3,428 m 11,247 ft	3,284 m 10,774 ft	144
3	Mount Lawu	Indonesia (Java)	3,265 m 10,712 ft	3,118 m 10,230 ft	147
4	Raung	Indonesia (Java)	3,332 m 10,932 ft	3,069 m 10,069 ft	263
5	Arjuno-Welirang	Indonesia (Java)	3,339 m 10,955 ft	2,812 m 9,226 ft	527
6	Mount Ciremai	Indonesia (Java)	3,078 m 10,098 ft	2,793 m 9,163 ft	285
7	Iyang-Argapura	Indonesia (Java)	3,088 m 10,131 ft	2,746 m 9,009 ft	342
8	Mount Sumbing	Indonesia (Java)	3,371 m 11,060 ft	2,577 m 8,455 ft	743
9	Mount Merbabu	Indonesia (Java)	3,145 m 10,318 ft	2,432 m 7,979 ft	713
10	Mount Pangrango	Indonesia (Java)	3,019 m 9,905 ft	2,426 m 7,959 ft	593
11	Mount Liman	Indonesia (Java)	2,563 m 8,409 ft	2,131 m 6,991 ft	432
12	Mount Cikuray	Indonesia (Java)	2,820 m 9,250 ft	2,103 m 6,900 ft	717
13	Mount Sundoro	Indonesia (Java)	3,150 m 10,330 ft	1,760 m 5,770 ft	1390
14	Gunung Karang	Indonesia (Java)	1,778 m 5,833 ft	1,703 m 5,587 ft	75
15	Mount Salak	Indonesia (Java)	2,211 m 7,254 ft	1,678 m 5,505 ft	533
16	Mount Butak	Indonesia (Java)	2,868 m 9,409 ft	1,675 m 5,495 ft	1193
17	Mount Muria	Indonesia (Java)	1,602 m 5,256 ft	1,595 m 5,233 ft	7

== Lesser Sunda Islands ==
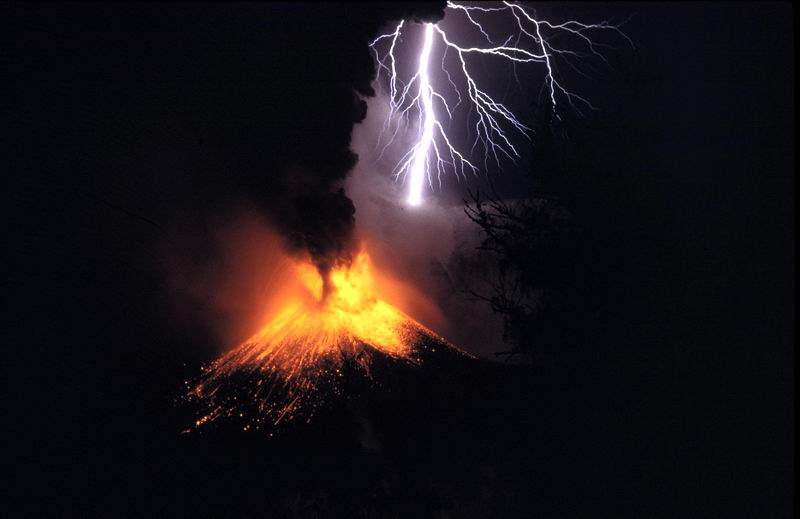
Mount Rinjani, Indonesia

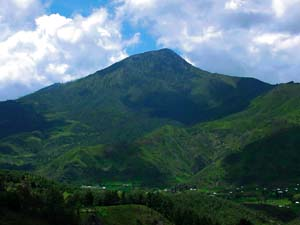
Tatamailau, East Timor

No	Peak	Country	Elevation	Prominence	Col
1	Mount Rinjani	Indonesia (Lombok)	3,726 m 12,224 ft	3,726 m 12,224 ft	0
2	Mount Agung	Indonesia (Bali)	3,031 m 9,944 ft	3,031 m 9,944 ft	0
3	Tatamailau	Timor-Leste	2,986 m 9,797 ft	2,986 m 9,797 ft	0
4	Mount Tambora	Indonesia (Sumbawa)	2,722 m 8,930 ft	2,722 m 8,930 ft	0
5	Gunung Mutis	Indonesia (Timor)	2,417 m 7,930 ft	1,970 m 6,460 ft	447
6	Poco Mandasawu	Indonesia (Flores)	2,370 m 7,780 ft	2,370 m 7,780 ft	0
7	Matebian	Timor-Leste	2,372 m 7,782 ft	2,022 m 6,634 ft	350
8	Sangeang Api	Indonesia (Sangeang Api)	1,949 m 6,394 ft	1,949 m 6,394 ft	0
9	Dola Koyakoya	Indonesia (Alor)	1,821 m 5,974 ft	1,821 m 5,974 ft	0
10	Olet Sangenges	Indonesia (Sumbawa)	1,840 m 6,040 ft	1,773 m 5,817 ft	67
11	Ili Boleng	Indonesia (Adonara)	1,661 m 5,449 ft	1,661 m 5,449 ft	0
12	Ili Labalekang	Indonesia (Lembata)	1,644 m 5,394 ft	1,644 m 5,394 ft	0
13	Inierie	Indonesia (Flores)	2,245 m 7,365 ft	1,643 m 5,390 ft	602

== Borneo ==
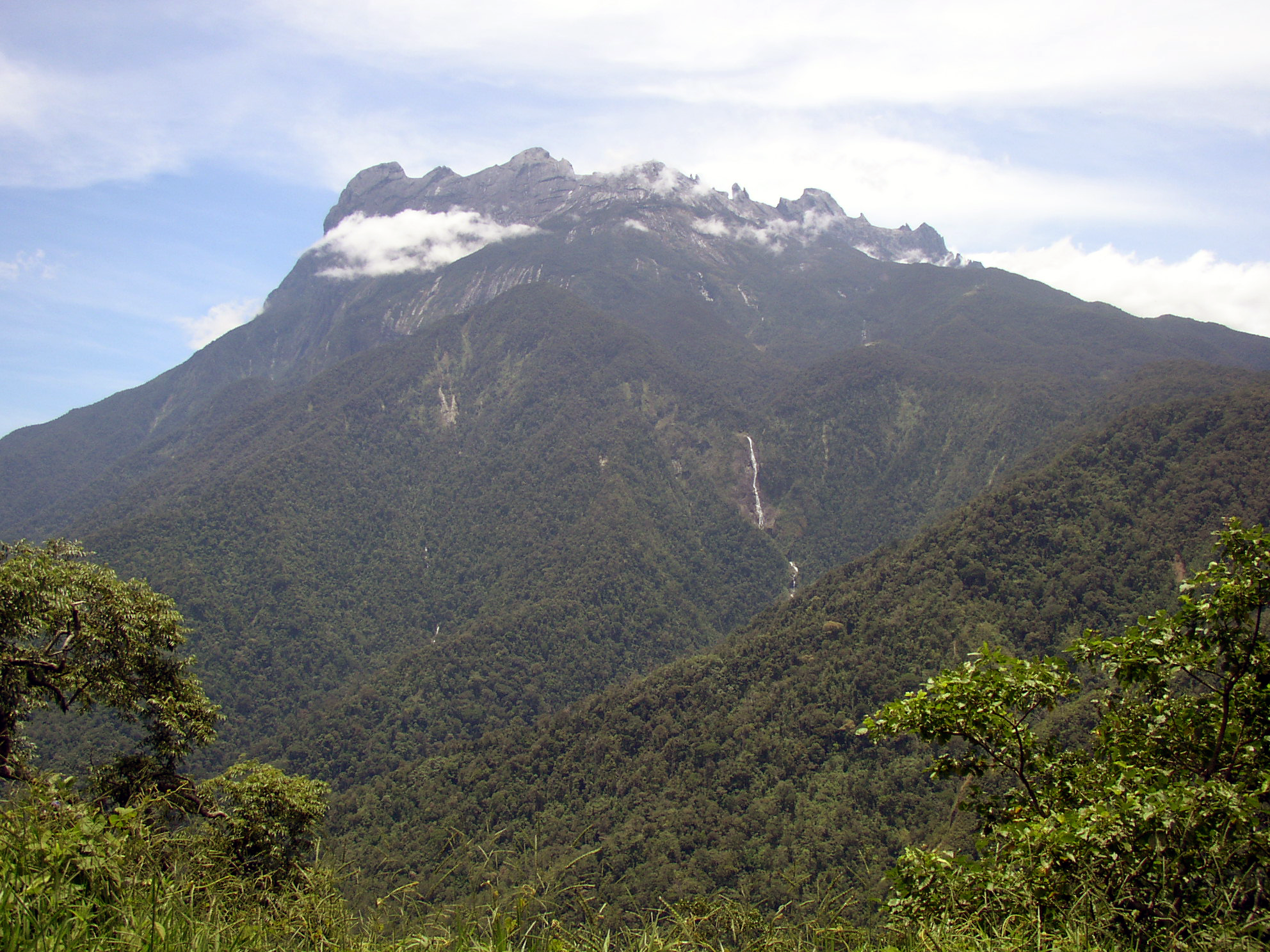
Mount Kinabalu, Malaysia

No	Peak	Country	Elevation	Prominence	Col
1	Mount Kinabalu	Malaysia (Borneo)	4,095 m 13,435 ft	4,095 m 13,435 ft	0
2	Mount Mulu	Malaysia (Borneo)	2,376 m 7,795 ft	2,024 m 6,640 ft	352
3	Bukit Raya	Indonesia (Borneo)	2,300 m 7,500 ft	2,018 m 6,621 ft	282
4	Mount Murud	Malaysia (Borneo)	2,423 m 7,949 ft	1,967 m 6,453 ft	456
5	Mount Trusmadi	Malaysia (Borneo)	2,643 m 8,671 ft	1,703 m 5,587 ft	940
6	Mount Niut	Indonesia (Borneo)	1,701 m 5,581 ft	1,661 m 5,449 ft	40
7	Batu Jumak	Indonesia (Borneo)	2,250 m 7,380 ft	1,576 m 5,171 ft	674
8	Bukit Batu	Indonesia (Borneo)	2,040 m 6,690 ft	1,572 m 5,157 ft	468
9	Mount Saran	Indonesia (Borneo)	1,758 m 5,768 ft	1,571 m 5,154 ft	187
10	Mount Rumput	Indonesia / Malaysia (Borneo)	1590	1,560 m 5,120 ft	674

== Sulawesi ==
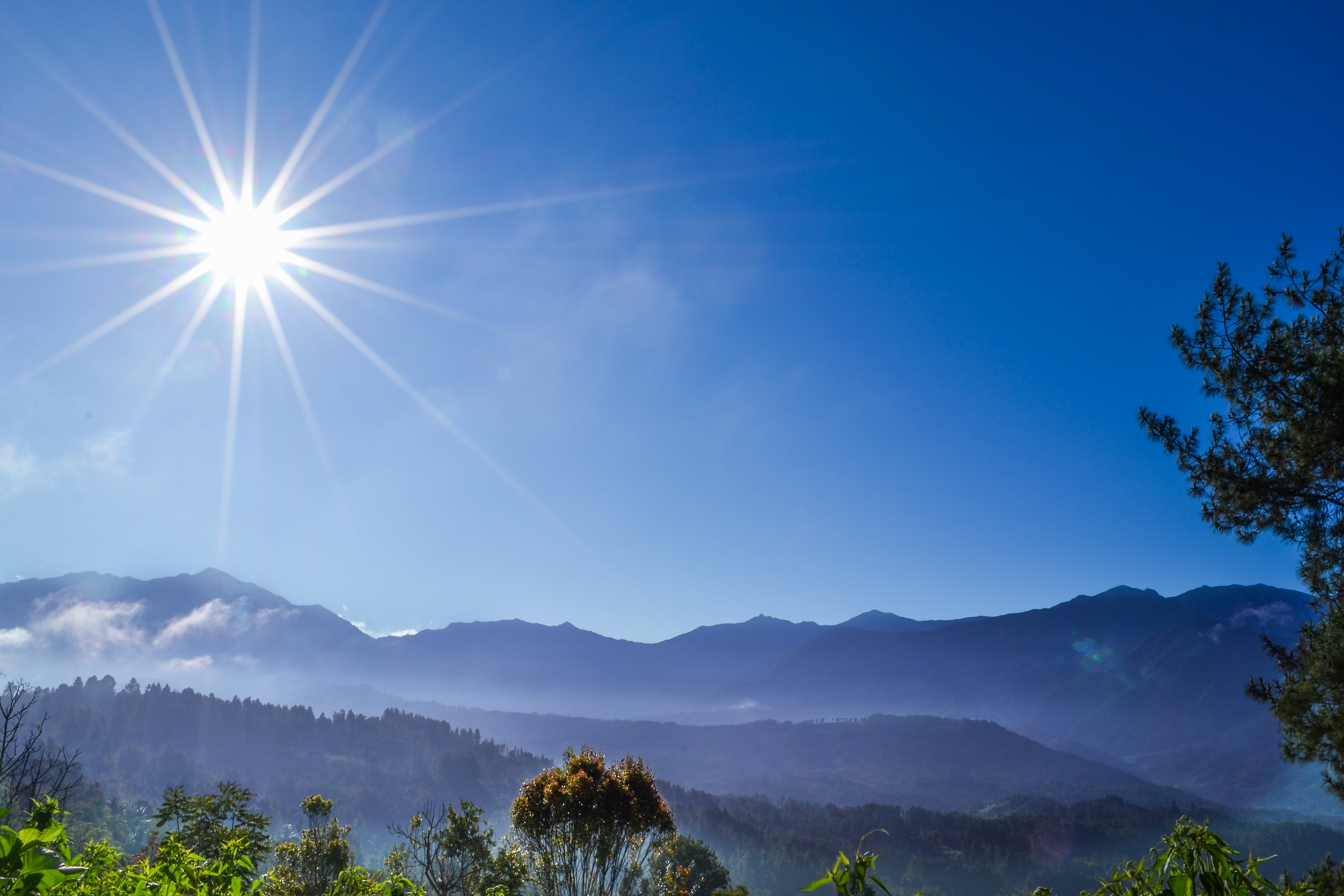
Mount Latimojong

No	Peak	Country	Elevation	Prominence	Col
1	Mount Rantemario	Indonesia (Sulawesi)	3,478 m 11,411 ft	3,478 m 11,411 ft	0
2	Moncong Lompobatang	Indonesia (Sulawesi)	2,874 m 9,429 ft	2,857 m 9,373 ft	17
3	Fuyul Sojol	Indonesia (Sulawesi)	3,030 m 9,940 ft	2,713 m 8,901 ft	317
4	Bulu Kandela	Indonesia (Sulawesi)	2,870 m 9,420 ft	2,258 m 7,408 ft	612
5	Mount Mekongga	Indonesia (Sulawesi)	2,650 m 8,690 ft	2,220 m 7,280 ft	430
6	Tanete Gandangdewata	Indonesia (Sulawesi)	3,074 m 10,085 ft	2,141 m 7,024 ft	933
7	Mount Tumpu	Indonesia (Sulawesi)	2,565 m 8,415 ft	2,054 m 6,739 ft	511
8	Pegunungan Pompangeo	Indonesia (Sulawesi)	2,590 m 8,500 ft	1,881 m 6,171 ft	709
9	Mount Klabat	Indonesia (Sulawesi)	1,990 m 6,530 ft	1,850 m 6,070 ft	140
10	Karangetang	Indonesia (Siau)	1,827 m 5,994 ft	1,827 m 5,994 ft	0
11	Bukii Dako	Indonesia (Sulawesi)	2,260 m 7,410 ft	1,801 m 5,909 ft	459
12	Buyu Lumut	Indonesia (Sulawesi)	2,403 m 7,884 ft	1,757 m 5,764 ft	646
13	Bulu Torompupu	Indonesia (Sulawesi)	2,463 m 8,081 ft	1,651 m 5,417 ft	812
14	Buyu Balease	Indonesia (Sulawesi)	3,016 m 9,895 ft	1,588 m 5,210 ft	1428
15	Huidu Matabulawa	Indonesia (Sulawesi)	1,964 m 6,444 ft	1,580 m 5,180 ft	384
16	Mount Sambapolulu	Indonesia (Kabaena)	1,570 m 5,150 ft	1,570 m 5,150 ft	0
17	Huidu Tentolomatinan	Indonesia (Sulawesi)	2,230 m 7,320 ft	1,565 m 5,135 ft	665

== Maluku Islands ==
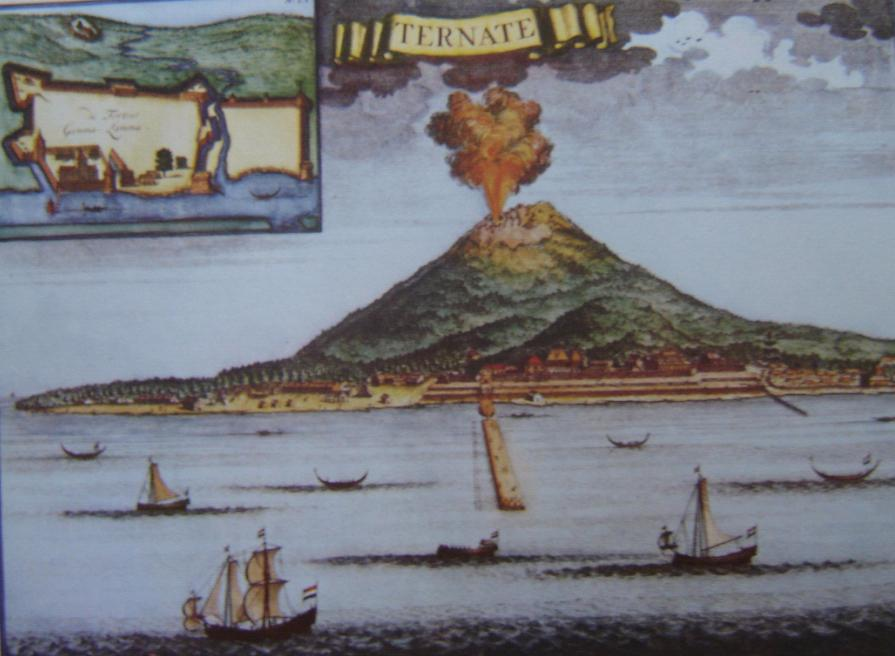
Gamalama, Indonesia

No	Peak	Country	Elevation (m/ft)	Prominence	Col
1	Mount Binaiya	Indonesia (Seram)	3,027 metres 9,931 feet	3,027 m / 9,931 ft	0
2	Mount Kapalatmada	Indonesia (Buru)	2,700 metres 8,900 feet	2,700 m / 8,858 ft	0
3	Buku Sibela	Indonesia (Bacan)	2,111 metres 6,926 feet	2,111 m / 6,925 ft	0
4	Pulau Tidore	Indonesia (Tidore)	1,750 metres 5,740 feet	1,750 m / 5,741 ft	0
5	Gamalama	Indonesia (Ternate)	1,715 metres 5,627 feet	1,715 m / 5,626 ft	0
6	Obi Island	Indonesia (Obi)	1,611 metres 5,285 feet	1,611 m / 5,285 ft	0
7	Mount Gamkonora	Indonesia (Halmahera)	1,560 metres 5,120 feet	1,560 m / 5,118 ft	0

== Papua ==
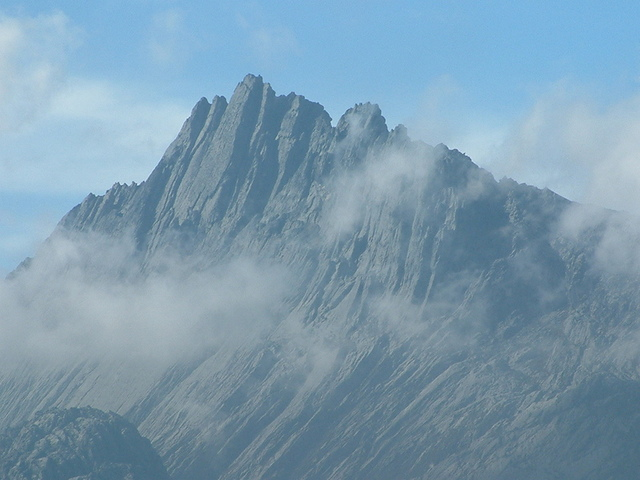
Puncak Jaya (Carstensz Pyramid), Indonesia

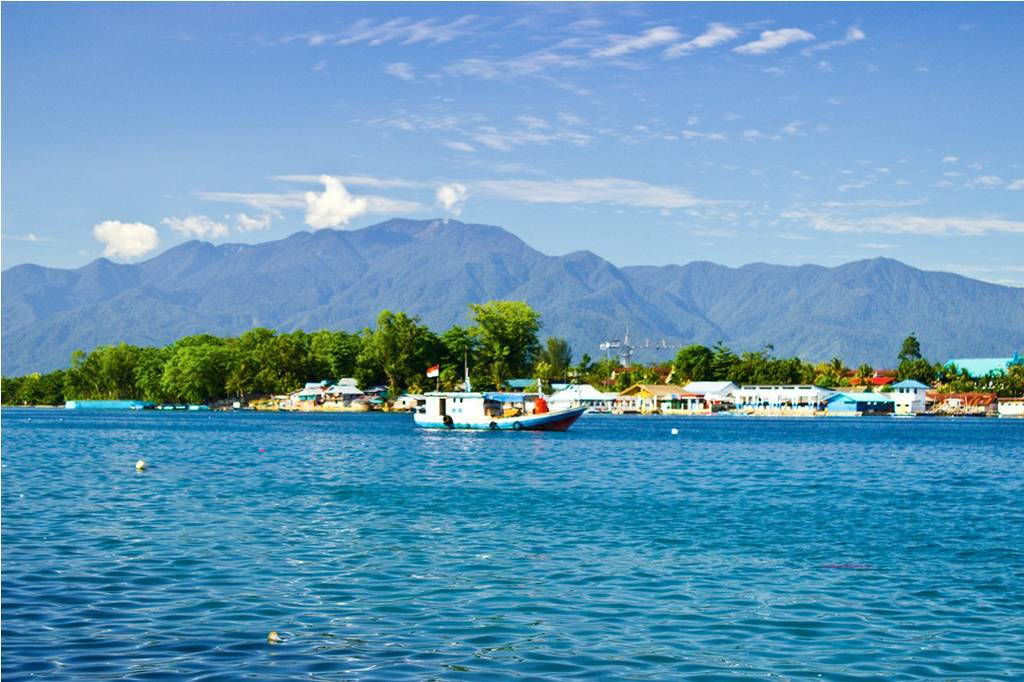
Mount Arfak, Indonesia

No	Peak	Country	Elevation	Prominence	Col
1	Puncak Jaya	Indonesia (New Guinea)	4,884 m 16,024 ft	4,884 m 16,024 ft	0
2	Mount Arfak	Indonesia (New Guinea)	2,955 m 9,695 ft	2,775 m 9,104 ft	179
3	Puncak Mandala	Indonesia (New Guinea)	4,760 m 15,620 ft	2,760 m 9,060 ft	2000
4	Mount Kobowre	Indonesia (New Guinea)	3,750 m 12,300 ft	2,217 m 7,274 ft	1533
5	Mount Gauttier	Indonesia (New Guinea)	2,230 m 7,320 ft	2,007 m 6,585 ft	223
6	Mount Wondiwoi	Indonesia (New Guinea)	2,180 m 7,150 ft	1,985 m 6,512 ft	195
7	Bon Irau	Indonesia (New Guinea)	2,500 m 8,200 ft	1,900 m 6,200 ft	600
8	Mount Cycloop	Indonesia (New Guinea)	2,000 m 6,600 ft	1,876 m 6,155 ft	124
9	Undundi-Wandandi	Indonesia (New Guinea)	3,640 m 11,940 ft	1,740 m 5,710 ft	1900
10	Mount Kumawa	Indonesia (New Guinea)	1,680 m 5,510 ft	1,636 m 5,367 ft	44
11	Angemuk	Indonesia (New Guinea)	3,949 m 12,956 ft	1,565 m 5,135 ft	2384
12	Deyjay	Indonesia (New Guinea)	3,340 m 10,960 ft	1,555 m 5,102 ft	1785

== See also ==
- For a complete list of ultras located on the island of New Guinea, see List of ultras of Oceania
- For the list of ultras located in the Philippines, see List of ultras of the Philippines
- List of volcanoes in Indonesia

== Sources ==
- List
- Map
