= Mount Rumput =

Mountain in the country of Malaysia

Rumput
- Location within Malaysia

Highest point
- Elevation: 1,570 m (5,150 ft)
- Prominence: 1,539 m (5,049 ft)
- Listing: Ultras; Ribu
- Coordinates: 1°43′N 109°40′E

Geography
- Location: Indonesia – Malaysia border

Mount Rumput (Gunung Rumput) is a mountain on the island of Borneo. It is 1590 metres tall and sits on the international border between Indonesia and Malaysia.

== See also ==
- List of ultras of the Malay Archipelago
