= Gedamsa Caldera =

Caldera in the Main Ethiopian Rift valley

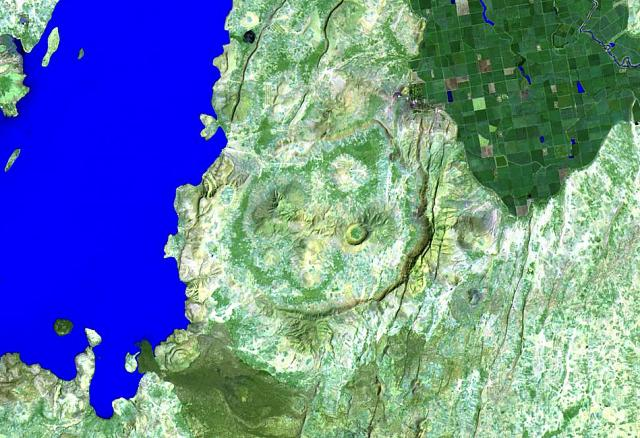
- the Gedamsa Caldera lies east of Lake Koka and SW of a Sugar farm

Highest point
- Elevation: 1,984 m (6,509 ft)
- Coordinates: 8°21′00″N 39°10′48″E

Geography
- Location within Ethiopia
- Location: Ethiopian Rift Valley, Ethiopia

Geology
- Mountain type: Caldera
- Last eruption: Holocene

The Gedamsa Caldera is a 7 x 9 km caldera in the Main Ethiopian Rift valley. The caldera has steep sides with 100–200 metres (328–656 ft) high walls, the upper parts of which consist predominantly of rhyolitic lava flows deposited in a series of trachite ignimbrite eruptions. There are small basaltic spatter cones and fumarolic activity inside the caldera floor along with a series of (Late Pleistocene to Holocene) rhyolite and pumice deposits and a Holocene lava dome/flow.
