= Mount Patah =

Quaternary age volcano on Sumatra

- Location within Sumatra

Highest point
- Elevation: 2,836 m (9,304 ft)
- Listing: Ultra; Ribu
- Coordinates: 4.27°S 103.30°E

Geography
- Location: Bengkulu, Sumatra, Indonesia

Geology
- Rock age: Quaternary
- Mountain type: Unknown
- Volcanic arc: Sunda Arc
- Last eruption: Unknown

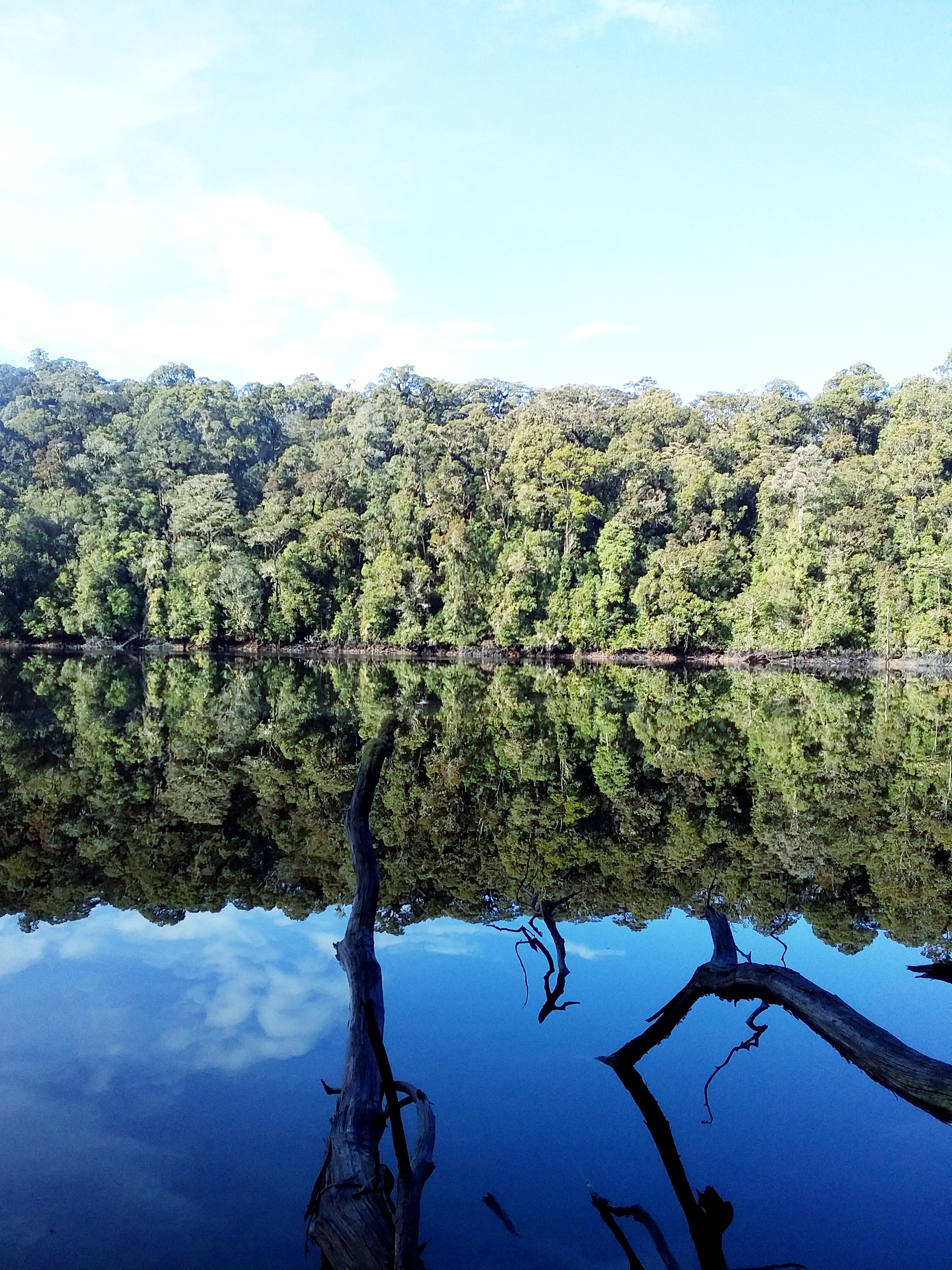
Volcanic lake in the Mount Patah area.

Mount Patah (Indonesian: Gunung Patah, means: Broken Mountain) is the highest mountain in the Indonesian province of Bengkulu, it is a heavily forested quaternary age volcano southeast of Mount Dempo on Sumatra island, Indonesia. On 1 May 1989, a fumarole activity was observed by a pilot near the summit. The exact location of the crater, the date of its formation and its geologic relationship is uncertain.

Mount Patah is in a protected forest area RajaMandara, with a total area of 42.567 hectares. The peak of the mountain is located on the border of the province of Bengkulu and South Sumatra with a height of 2,852 meters above sea level, in the western part there is a crater sulfur which is located into the region of Bengkulu province at an altitude of 2,600 meters above sea level, in the southern part of the crater there is a volcanic lake with an altitude of 2,550 meters above sea level.

A picture of the crater of Mount Patah

== See also ==
- List of ultras of the Malay Archipelago
- List of volcanoes in Indonesia
