= Leroboleng =

Complex volcano on the island of Floes, Indonesia

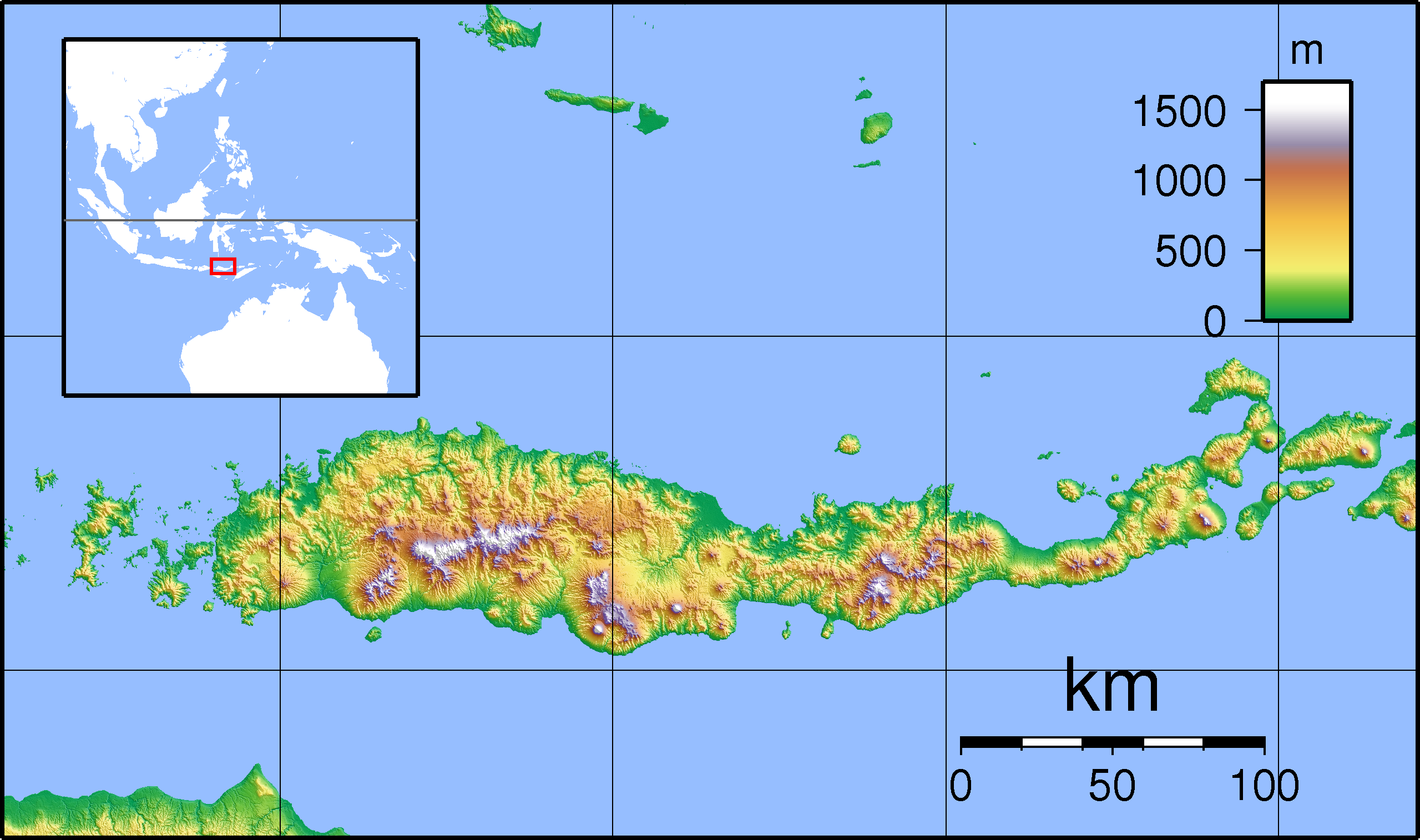
- Location within Flores

Highest point
- Elevation: 1,095 m (3,593 ft)
- Coordinates: 8.358°S 122.842°E

Geography
- Location: Flores Island, Indonesia

Geology
- Mountain type: Complex volcano
- Volcanic arc: Sunda Arc
- Last eruption: June to July 2003

Leroboleng is a volcano located in the eastern part of the island of Flores, Indonesia.

== See also ==
- List of volcanoes in Indonesia
