= Bukit Daun =

- Location within Sumatra

Highest point
- Elevation: 2,467 m (8,094 ft)
- Listing: Ultra Ribu
- Coordinates: 3°23′S 102°22′E

Geography
- Location: Sumatra, Indonesia
- Parent range: Barisan Mountains

Geology
- Mountain type: stratovolcano
- Volcanic arc: Sunda Arc
- Last eruption: Unknown

Bukit Daun (English: Daun Hill, means: Leaves Hill) is a stratovolcano, located in a sparsely populated region in Sumatra, Indonesia. A 600 m wide of crater lake is located at the summit. A smaller crater lake, Tologo Kecil, is found in the south-west flank.

== See also ==
- List of ultras of the Malay Archipelago
- List of volcanoes in Indonesia
