= Mount Kembar =

Pleistocene volcano in Sumatra, Indonesia

Kembar

Highest point
- Elevation: 2,245 m (7,365 ft)
- Coordinates: 3.850°N 97.664°E

Geography
- Location: Sumatra, Indonesia

Geology
- Mountain type: Shield volcano
- Volcanic arc: Sunda Arc
- Last eruption: pleistocene

Mount Kembar (Indonesian: Gunung Kembar, means: Twin Mountain) is a Pleistocene volcano, located in the northern Sumatra island, Indonesia. It contains a fumarole field, named Gayolesten. The volcanic complex is located in the junction of two geological fault systems and it is a shield volcano.

== See also ==
- List of volcanoes in Indonesia
