= Seulawah Agam =

Stratovolcano at the northwest tip of Sumatra

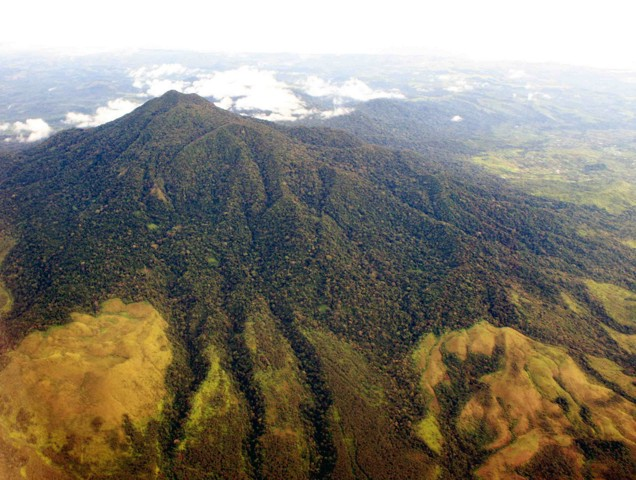
- Mount Seulawah Agam

Highest point
- Elevation: 1,810 m (5,940 ft)
- Prominence: 1,610 m (5,280 ft)
- Listing: Ultra; Ribu
- Coordinates: 05°26′51″N 95°39′21″E

Geography
- Location within Sumatra
- Location: northwest of Sumatra, Indonesia

Geology
- Mountain type: Stratovolcano
- Volcanic arc: Sunda Arc
- Last eruption: January 1839

Seulawah Agam is an extensive forested stratovolcano located at the northwestern tip of Sumatra. Several names have been given to the mountain: Seulawaih Agam, Seulawain Agam, Solawa Agam, Solawaik Agam, Selawadjanten and Goldberg.

The volcano was formed during the Pleistocene-Holocene age. The mountain has a large caldera, called Lam Teuba. A smaller 8×6 km caldera is within the Lam Teuba caldera. The volcano contains several hills: sedimentary hills, old volcano hills, a volcanic cone and peneplain area. The volcanic cone was formed by lava and pyroclastic flows. There are three craters. The Tanah Cempago crater is easily recognized, while the other two are covered with vegetation.

As of January 2013, Seulawah Agam is showing signs of renewed activity. Localised seismicity has been recorded in the vicinity of the volcano.

== See also ==
- List of ultras of the Malay Archipelago
- List of volcanoes in Indonesia
