= Geureudong =

Stratovolcanic complex in northern Sumatra, Indonesia

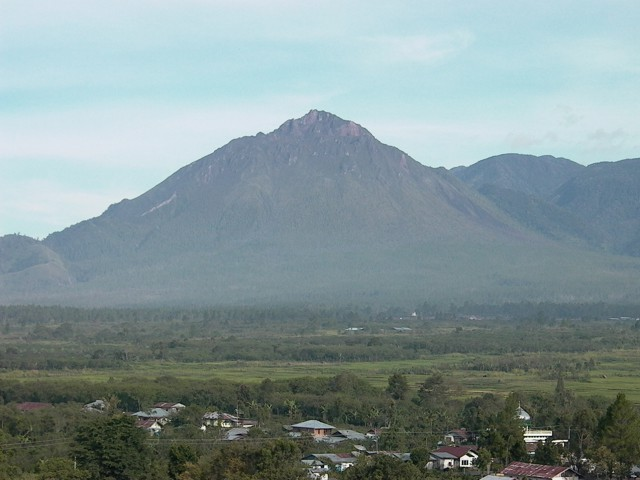
- Geureudong Mountain

Highest point
- Elevation: 2,885 m (9,465 ft)
- Listing: Ultra; Ribu
- Coordinates: 4.813°N 96.82°E

Geography
- Location: Bener Meriah Regency, Aceh, Sumatra, Indonesia

Geology
- Mountain type: Stratovolcano
- Volcanic arc: Sunda Arc

Geureudong or Bur ni Geureudong or Bur ni Telong is a stratovolcanic complex in northern Sumatra, Indonesia. The official name of the whole complex is confusing between the two adjacent volcanoes: Bur ni Geureudong and Bur ni Telong. Two other volcanic cones are Salah Nama and Pepanji, and there are small sediment hills. Bur ni Geureudong has been eroded since the Pleistocene age, but has solfatara and hot springs on its flanks. Bur ni Telong is located in the south of Bur ni Geureudong. Bur ni Telong has active crater that lava flows are exposed in the southern flank.

== See also ==
- List of ultras of the Malay Archipelago
- List of volcanoes in Indonesia
