= Mount Kunyit =

Fumarolic stratovolcano in Sumatra, Indonesia

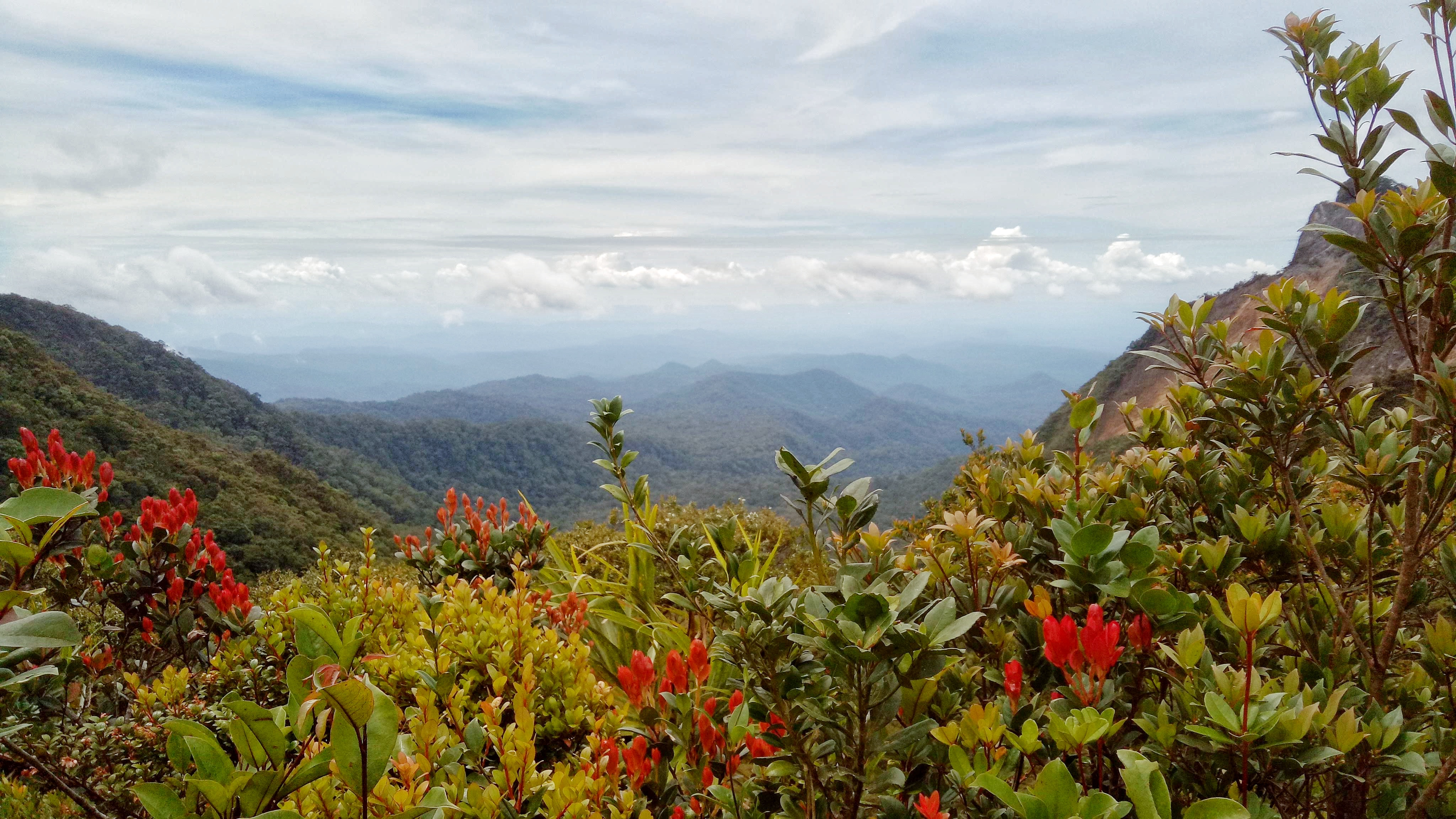

Highest point
- Elevation: 2,151 m (7,057 ft)
- Coordinates: 2°16′33″S 101°29′24″E

Geography
- Location: Kerinci Regency, Jambi, Sumatra, Indonesia
- Parent range: Bukit Barisan

Geology
- Mountain type: Stratovolcano
- Volcanic arc: Sunda Arc
- Last eruption: Pleistocene

Mount Kunyit (Indonesian: Gunung Kunyit, "Turmeric Mountain"; also known as Bukit Belerang) is a fumarolic stratovolcano on Talang Kemuning Village, Gunung Raya District, Kerinci Regency, Jambi, Sumatra, Indonesia. The summit contains two craters; the uppermost is a crater lake.

== See also ==
- List of volcanoes in Indonesia
