= Mount Dempo =

Highest stratovolcano in the island of Sumatra

- Gunung Dempo
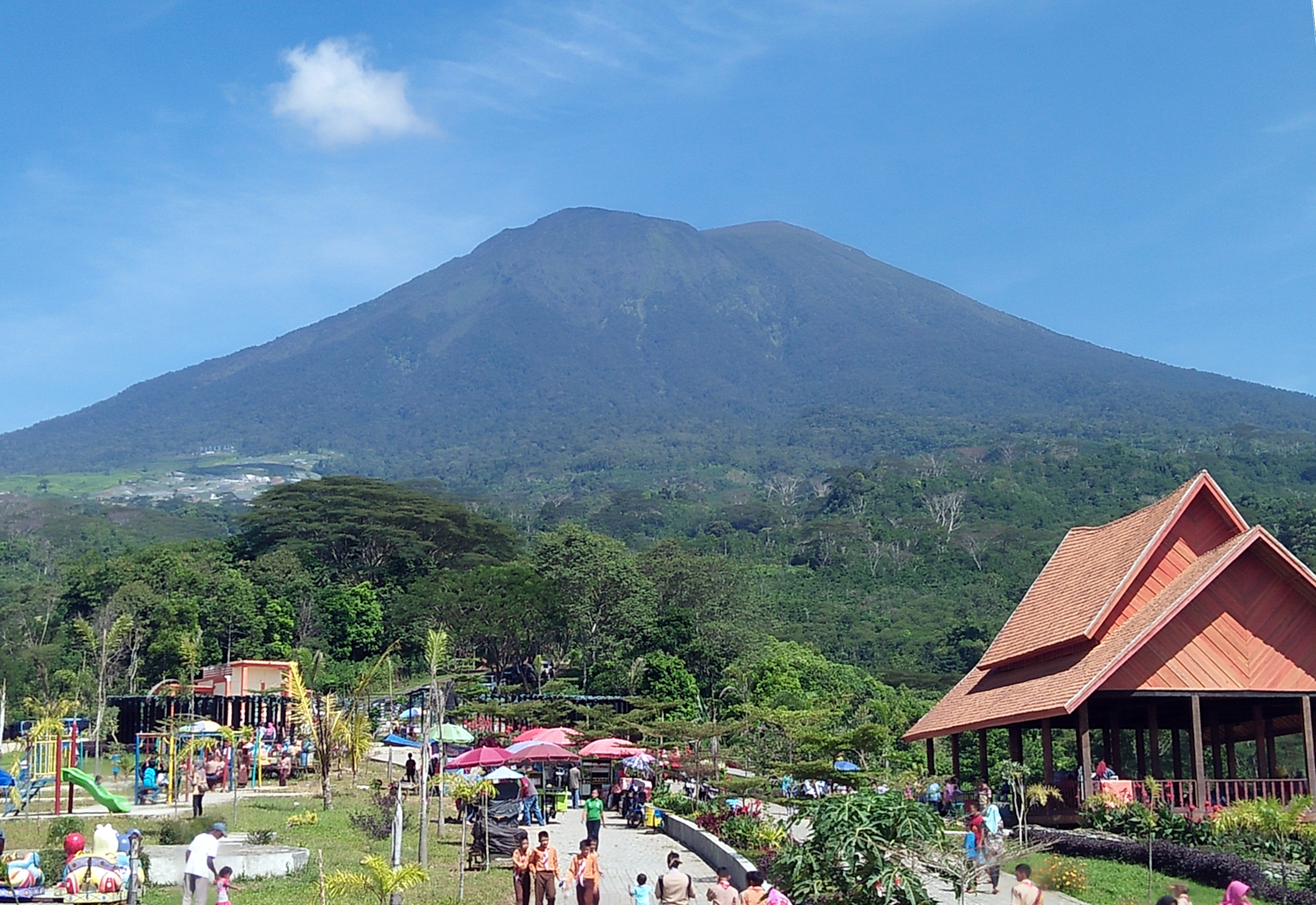
- Mount Dempo in 2018

Highest point
- Elevation: 3,142 m (10,308 ft)
- Prominence: 2,450 m (8,040 ft)
- Listing: Ultra; Ribu
- Coordinates: 4°00′57″S 103°07′42″E

Geography
- Location within Sumatra Location within Indonesia
- Location: Sumatra, Indonesia
- Parent range: Bukit Barisan

Geology
- Mountain type: Stratovolcano
- Volcanic arc: Sunda Arc
- Last eruption: 21 August 2023

Mount Dempo is the highest stratovolcano in South Sumatra province that rises above Pasumah Plain near Pagar Alam and adjacent with Bengkulu Province. Seven craters are found around the summit. A 400-metre (1,300 ft) wide lake is found at the north-west end of the crater complex.

Historical activity has been confined to being small-to-moderate explosive activity that produced ashfall near the volcano.

Recent activity includes:

- A phreatic eruption on January 1, 2009.
- July 19, 2023 Steam and ash plume rose 1.3 km above the summit.
- August 21, 2023 at 1:54 AM (GMT+7), a small phreatic explosion occurred causing small pyroclastic flows to ride down the northwest slope a few hundred meters downward, resulting to no injuries nor any damage to the surrounding landscape other than the volcano itself, lasting no more than 239s/3m59s.
- April 7, 2026 01:37 A phreatic eruption lasted nearly three minutes.

The Royal Rotterdam Lloyd Dutch shipping company named and operated a fine passenger liner named 'Dempo' from 1931 to 1944 between Europe and South Asia.

== See also ==
- List of ultras of the Malay Archipelago
- List of volcanoes in Indonesia
