= Lumut =

Lumut can refer to:

- Lumut, Perak, a coastal town in Malaysia
  - Lumut (federal constituency), Perak
- Lumut, Brunei, a populated place in Belait District, Brunei

== See also ==
- Bukit Lumut Balai, a stratovolcano on Sumatraisland, Indonesia
