= Tarakan (disambiguation) =

Tarakan is an island city in North Kalimantan, Indonesia.

Tarakan may also refer to:

- Mount Tarakan, a volcano in the Halmahera islands
- Battle of Tarakan (1942), a battle in World War II
- Battle of Tarakan (1945), a battle in World War II
- HMAS Tarakan (L 129), a heavy landing craft commissioned in 1973
- HMAS Tarakan (L3017), a tank landing ship commissioned in 1946
- таракан, Russian for cockroach

== See also ==
- Taraqan
