= Yersey =

Submarine volcano in Indonesia

- Summit depth: −3,800 metres (−12,000 ft)?

Location
- Location: Lesser Sunda Islands
- Coordinates: 7.53°S 123.95°E
- Country: Indonesia

Geology
- Type: Submarine volcano?
- Age of rock: Uncertain
- Last eruption: Unknown

Yersey is a submarine volcano in Indonesia. It was listed as an active volcano in the old sea charts at the location in the southern of Banda Basin. During the 1929 survey, the volcano was spotted at the depth of 3,800 m along the ridge that stretches from Batu Tara until Gunungapi Wetar.

== See also ==
- List of volcanoes in Indonesia
