= Mount Sukaria =

Caldera in Indonesia

Highest point
- Elevation: 1,500 m (4,900 ft)
- Coordinates: 8.792°S 121.77°E

Geography
- Location: Flores, Indonesia

Geology
- Mountain type: Caldera
- Volcanic arc: Sunda Arc

Sukaria is an 8 km wide caldera to the northeast of Mount Iya on Flores, Indonesia. The southern caldera wall is irregular and a small fumarolic area is found in the western flanks which contains several vents and eject geyser-like water column. No historical records of its activity are available from this volcanic caldera.

== See also ==
- List of volcanoes in Indonesia
