= Tobaru =

Highest point
- Elevation: 1,035 m (3,396 ft)
- Coordinates: 1.63°N 127.67°E

Geography
- Location: Halmahera, Indonesia

Geology
- Mountain type: unknown
- Last eruption: unknown

Mount Tobaru or Mount Lolodai is located in the northern part of Halmahera island, west of Dukono volcano. Little is known about this volcano because of its remote location.

== See also ==
- List of volcanoes in Indonesia
