= May 2026 Dukono Volcano Eruption =

Volcanic eruption

May 2026 eruption of Dukono
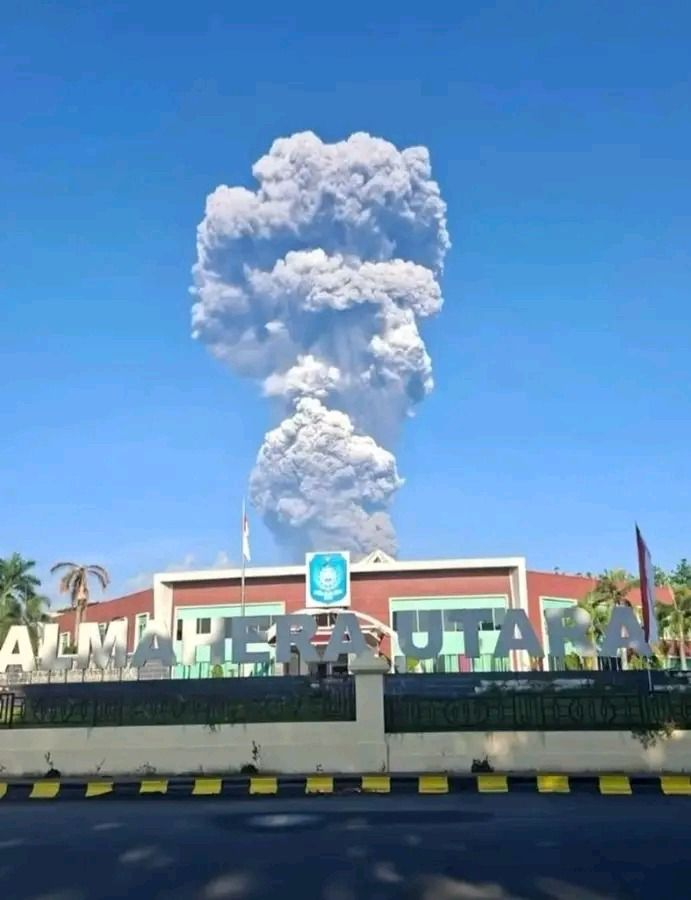
- Volcano: Dukono
- Start date: 8 May 2026
- Start time: 07:14 am local time
- Type: Explosive
- Location: Halmahera, Indonesia
- Impact: 3 dead, 5 injured

On May 8, 2026, at 07:14 a.m., (WIT) The Dukono Volcano erupted in North Maluku, Indonesia killing 3 hikers. The eruption lasted about 16 minutes, with ash reaching upwards of 10 km (6.2 miles). The eruption had been warned, but 20 hikers still attempted to scale the volcano, resulting in 3 deaths and 5 injuries.

At least 100 rescuers, military and police personnel, as well as two thermal drones, were deployed to the volcano to try and locate the missing hikers. The search was focused around the crater, covering an area of around 700 metres (2,300 ft). The search was halted on Friday evening as the volcano was still erupting. On Saturday, searches were hampered by four morning eruptions. The search was finally completed on 10 May 2026.

== Background ==
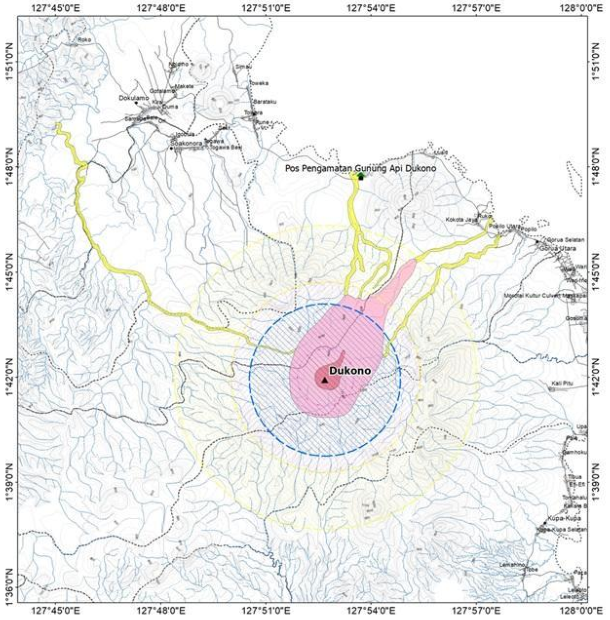
The area of the eruption

Dukono was noted for having potential for eruption, so a climbing ban was ordered. However, neither the local guide nor the villagers were aware of the climbing ban since April. Some visitors entered with the aim to create social media content.

== Eruption ==
At 07:14 a.m., (WIT), the volcano exploded, sending ash as high as 10 km (6.2 miles) into the air. The eruption also included laval rocks to crash into the ground. Ground shaking from the volcano delayed rescuers from searching for victims, leaving 3 dead, and five injured.

The deceased were identified as two Singaporeans, aged 30 and 27, and an Indonesian woman from Ternate. At least five sustained injuries of the 17 people rescued. The body of the Indonesian woman was retrieved on 9 May 2026 while the bodies of the two Singaporeans were retrieved on 10 May 2026.
