= List of volcanoes in Indonesia =

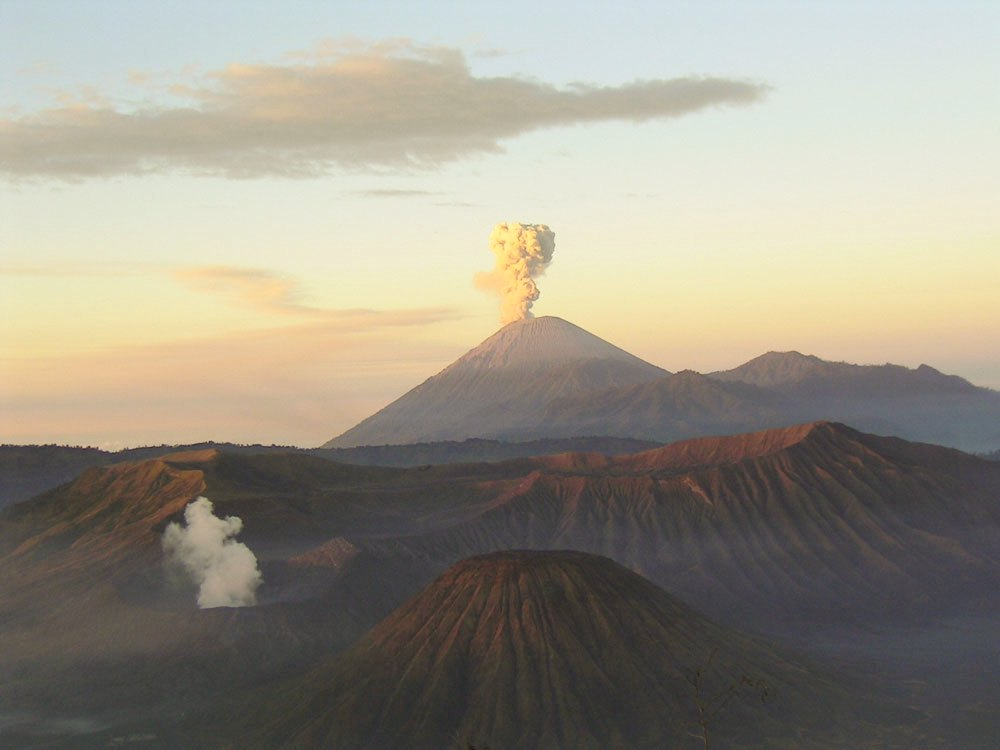
Mahameru (Semeru) above Mount Bromo, East Java.

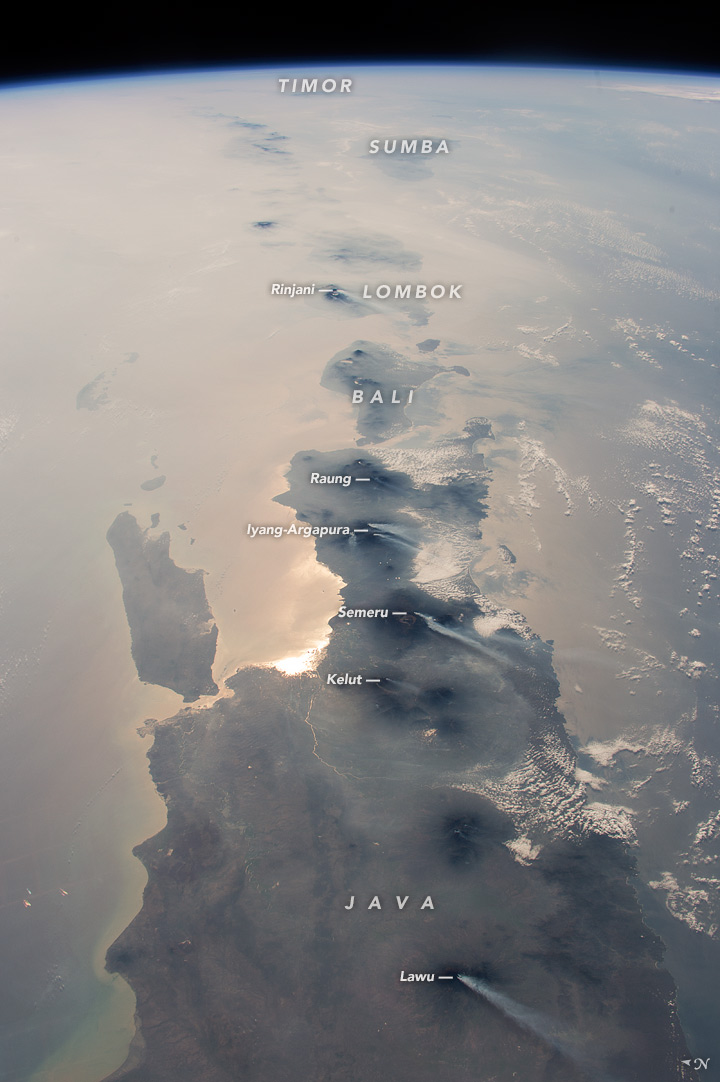
East Indonesia Islands from ISS. Seven active volcanoes are visible: 5 in East Java, Agung in Bali and Rinjani in Lombok.

The geography of Indonesia is dominated by volcanoes that are formed due to subduction zones between the Eurasian plate and the Indo-Australian plate. Some of the volcanoes are notable for their eruptions, for instance, Krakatoa for its global effects in 1883, the Lake Toba Caldera for its supervolcanic eruption estimated to have occurred 74,000 years before present which was responsible for six years of volcanic winter, and Mount Tambora for the most violent eruption in recorded history in 1815 and the resulting "Year Without a Summer".

Volcanoes in Indonesia are part of the Alpide belt and Pacific Ring of Fire. The 150 entries in the list below are grouped into six geographical regions, four of which belong to the volcanoes of the Sunda Arc trench system. The remaining two groups are volcanoes of Halmahera, including its surrounding volcanic islands, and volcanoes of Sulawesi and the Sangihe Islands. The latter group is in one volcanic arc together with the Philippine volcanoes.

The most active volcano is Mount Merapi on Java. Since AD 1000, Kelut has erupted more than 30 times, of which the largest eruption was at scale 5 on the volcanic explosivity index (VEI), while Mount Merapi has erupted more than 80 times. The International Association of Volcanology and Chemistry of the Earth's Interior has named Mount Merapi as a Decade Volcano since 1995 because of its high volcanic activity.

As of 2012, Indonesia has 127 active volcanoes and about 5 million people live within the danger zones. It has been conjectured that the earthquake and tsunami event of 26 December 2004 could trigger eruptions, with Mount Sinabung (dormant since the 1600s) erupting in 2010 as a possible example.

The word for Mount in Indonesian and many regional languages of the country is Gunung. Thus, Mount Merapi may be referred to as Gunung Merapi.

== Scope ==
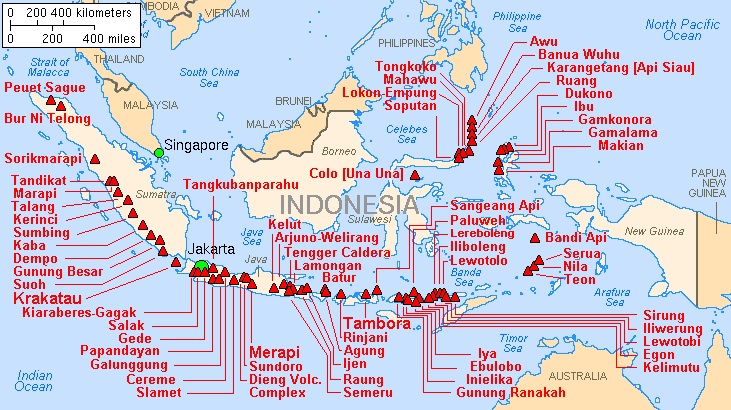
Major volcanoes in Indonesia

There is no single standard definition of a volcano. It can be defined as individual vents, volcanic edifices, or volcanic fields. The interior of ancient volcanoes may have been eroded, creating a new subsurface magma chamber as a separate volcano. Many contemporary active volcanoes rise as young parasitic cones from flank vents or at a central crater. Some volcanic cones are grouped into one volcano name, for instance, the Tengger caldera complex, whereas, individual vents are named by local people. The status of a volcano, either active or dormant, cannot be defined precisely. An indication of a volcano is determined by either its historical records, radiocarbon dating, or geothermal activities.

The primary source of the list below is taken from the Volcanoes of the World book, compiled by two volcanologists Tom Simkin and Lee Siebert, in which active volcanoes in the past 10,000 years (Holocene) are listed. Particularly for Indonesia, Simkin and Siebert used a catalogue of active volcanoes from the International Association of Volcanology and Chemistry of the Earth's Interior publication series. The Simkin and Siebert list is the most complete list of volcanoes in Indonesia, but the accuracy of the record varies from one region to another in terms of contemporary activities and fatalities in recent eruptions. Complementary sources for the latest volcanic data are taken from the Volcanological Survey of Indonesia, a governmental institution which is responsible for volcanic activities and geological hazard mitigation in Indonesia, and some academic resources.

== Geographical groups ==
=== Sumatra ===
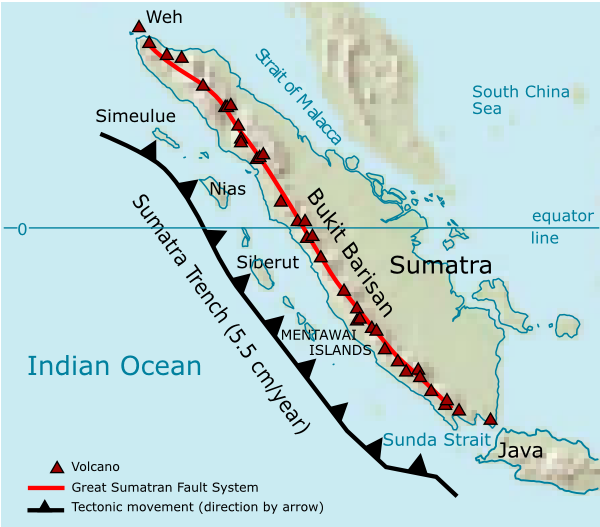
Map showing the location of volcanoes and geological fault lines of Sumatra

The geography of Sumatra is dominated by a mountain range called Bukit Barisan (lit: "a row of hills"). The mountain range spans nearly 1,700 km (1,100 mi) from the north to the south of the island, and it was formed by movement of the Australian tectonic plate. The plate moves with a convergence rate of 5.5 cm/year which has created major earthquakes on the western side of Sumatra including the 2004 Sumatra–Andaman earthquake. The tectonic movement has been responsible not only for earthquakes, but also for the formation of magma chambers beneath the island.

Only one of the 35 active volcanoes, Weh, is separated from the Sumatran mainland. The separation was caused by a large eruption that filled the lowland between Weh and the rest of the mainland with sea water in the Pleistocene epoch. The largest volcano of Sumatra is the supervolcano Toba within the 100 km (62 mi) × 30 km (19 mi) Lake Toba, which was created after a caldera collapse (est. in 74,000 Before Present). The eruption is estimated to have been at level eight on the VEI scale, the highest level for a volcanic eruption. The highest peak of the mountain range is Mount Kerinci with an elevation of 3,800 m (12,467 ft).

Name	Shape	Elevation	Last eruption (VEI)	Coordinates
Weh	stratovolcano	617 metres (2,024 ft)	Pleistocene	5.82°N 95.28°E
Seulawah Agam	stratovolcano	1,810 metres (5,940 ft)	1839 (2)	5.448°N 95.658°E
Peuet Sague	complex volcano	2,801 metres (9,190 ft)	25 December 2000 (2)	4.914°N 96.329°E
Geureudong	stratovolcano	2,885 metres (9,465 ft)	1937	4.813°N 96.82°E
Kembar	shield volcano	2,245 metres (7,365 ft)	Pleistocene	3.850°N 97.664°E
Sibayak	stratovolcano	2,212 metres (7,257 ft)	1881	3.23°N 98.52°E
Sinabung	stratovolcano	2,460 metres (8,070 ft)	2 March 2021 (4)	3.17°N 98.392°E
Toba	supervolcano	2,157 metres (7,077 ft)	75000 BC (8)	2.58°N 98.83°E
Helatoba-Tarutung	fumarole field	1,100 metres (3,600 ft)	Pleistocene	2.03°N 98.93°E
Imun	unknown	1,505 metres (4,938 ft)	unknown	2.158°N 98.93°E
Sibualbuali	stratovolcano	1,819 metres (5,968 ft)	unknown	1.556°N 99.255°E
Lubukraya	stratovolcano	1,862 metres (6,109 ft)	unknown	1.478°N 99.209°E
Sorikmarapi	stratovolcano	2,145 metres (7,037 ft)	2018	0.686°N 99.539°E
Talakmau	complex volcano	2,919 metres (9,577 ft)	unknown	0.079°N 99.98°E
Sarik-Gajah	volcanic cone	unknown	unknown	0.008°N 100.20°E
Marapi	complex volcano	2,885 metres (9,465 ft)	2025 (continuing)	0.381°S 100.473°E
Tandikat	stratovolcano	2,438 metres (7,999 ft)	1924 (1)	0.433°S 100.317°E
Talang	stratovolcano	2,597 metres (8,520 ft)	27 November 2007 (2)	0.978°S 100.679°E
Kerinci	stratovolcano	3,800 metres (12,500 ft)	2024 (on going)	1.697°S 101.264°E
Hutapanjang	stratovolcano	2,021 metres (6,631 ft)	unknown	2.33°S 101.60°E
Sumbing	stratovolcano	2,507 metres (8,225 ft)	23 May 1921 (2)	2.414°S 101.728°E
Masurai	stratovolcano	2,916 metres (9,567 ft)	Pleistocene	2.503°S 101.728°E
Kunyit	stratovolcano	2,151 metres (7,057 ft)	unknown	2.592°S 101.85°E
Pendan	unknown	2,175 metres (7,136 ft)	unknown	2.82°S 102.02°E
Belirang-Beriti	complex volcano	1,958 metres (6,424 ft)	unknown	2.82°S 102.18°E
Bukit Daun	stratovolcano	2,467 metres (8,094 ft)	unknown	3.38°S 102.37°E
Kaba	stratovolcano	1,952 metres (6,404 ft)	22 August 2000 (1)	3.52°S 102.62°E
Dempo	stratovolcano	3,173 metres (10,410 ft)	2025	4.03°S 103.13°E
Patah	unknown	2,817 metres (9,242 ft)	unknown	4.27°S 103.30°E
Bukit Lumut Balai	stratovolcano	2,055 metres (6,742 ft)	unknown	4.23°S 103.62°E
Besar	stratovolcano	1,899 metres (6,230 ft)	April 1940 (1)	4.43°S 103.67°E
Ranau	caldera	1,881 metres (6,171 ft)	unknown	4.83°S 103.92°E
Sekincau Belirang	caldera	1,719 metres (5,640 ft)	unknown	5.12°S 104.32°E
Suoh	caldera	1,000 metres (3,300 ft)	24 May 2024	5.25°S 104.27°E
Hulubelu	caldera	1,040 metres (3,410 ft)	1836	5.35°S 104.60°E
Rajabasa	stratovolcano	1,281 metres (4,203 ft)	1798	5.78°S 105.625°E

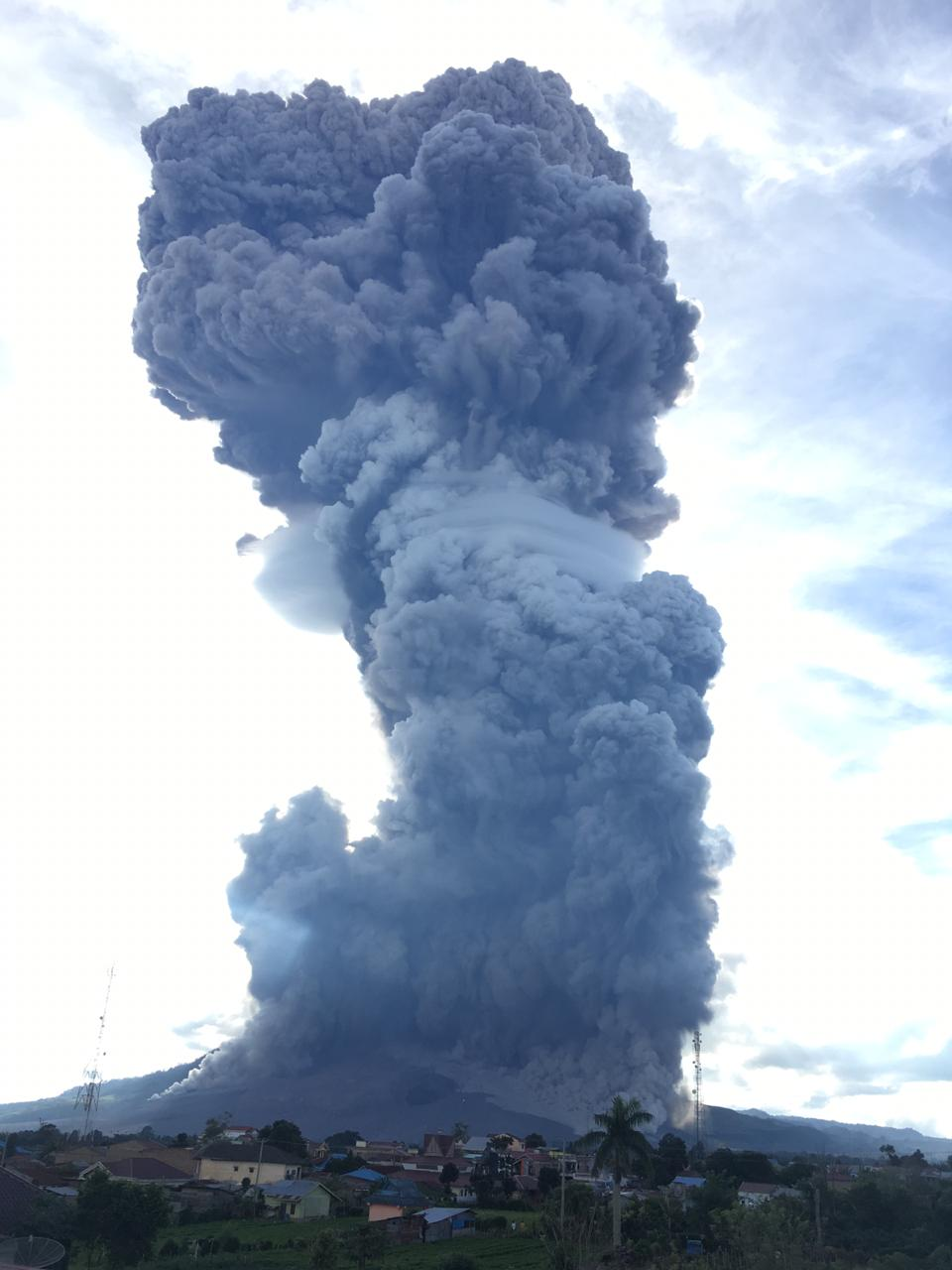
Explosive eruption of Sinabung on 9 June 2019.

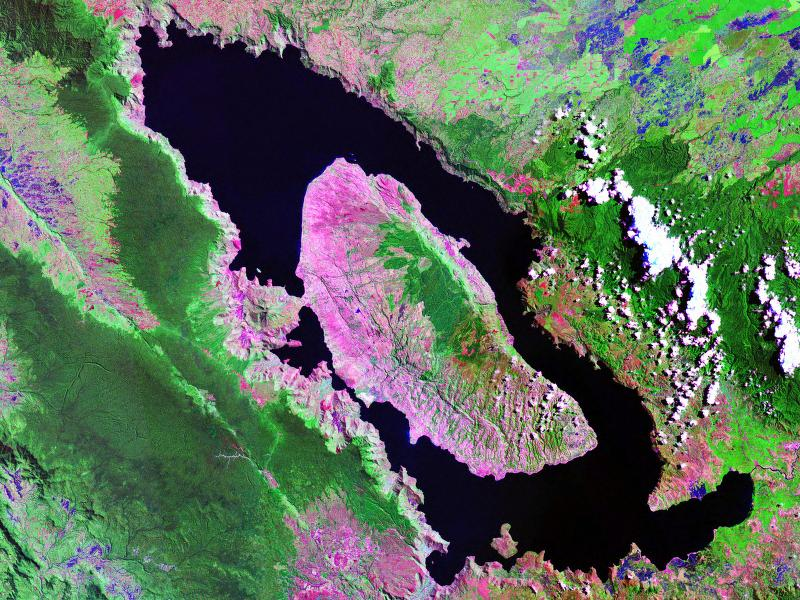
Landsat image of Lake Toba

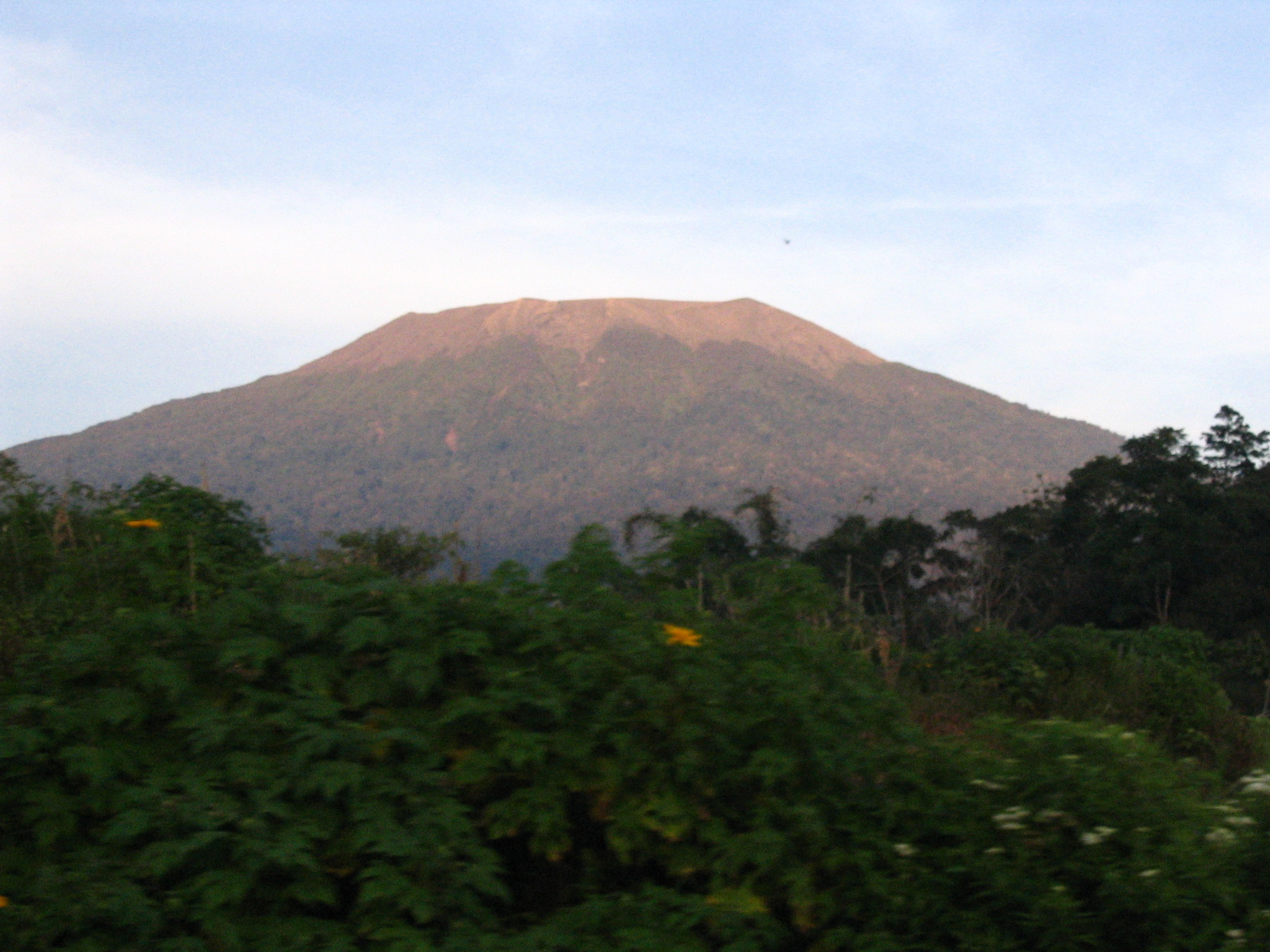
Marapi

=== Sunda Strait and Java ===
The Sunda Strait separates the islands of Sumatra and Java with the volcanic island Krakatoa lying between them. Krakatau erupted violently in 1883, destroying two-thirds of the island and leaving a large caldera under the sea. This cataclysmic explosion was heard as far away as the island of Rodrigues near Mauritius (approx. 4,800 kilometres (3,000 mi) away). A new parasitic cone, called Anak Krakatau (or the child of Krakatau), rose from the sea at the centre of the caldera in 1930. The other Krakatau islets from the 1883 eruptions are known as Sertung, Panjang and Rakata.

Java is a relatively small island compared to Sumatra, but it has a higher concentration of active volcanoes. There are 45 active volcanoes on the island excluding 20 small craters and cones in the Dieng volcanic complex and the young cones in the Tengger caldera complex. Some volcanoes are grouped together in the list below because of their close location. Mount Merapi, Semeru and Kelud are the most active volcanoes in Java. Mount Semeru has been continuously erupting since 1967. Mount Merapi has been named as one of the Decade Volcanoes since 1995. Ijen has a unique colourful caldera lake which is an extremely acidic natural reservoir (pH<0.3). There are sulfur mining activities at Ijen, where miners collect highly concentrated sulfur rocks by hand.

Name	Shape	Elevation	Last eruption (VEI)	Coordinates
Krakatau	caldera	813 metres (2,667 ft)	2023 6.102°S 105.423°E	
Pulosari	stratovolcano	1,346 metres (4,416 ft)	unknown	6.342°S 105.975°E
Gunung Karang	stratovolcano	1,778 metres (5,833 ft)	unknown	6.27°S 106.042°E
Salak	stratovolcano	2,211 metres (7,254 ft)	31 January 1938 (2)	6.72°S 106.73°E
Kiaraberes-Gagak	stratovolcano	1,511 metres (4,957 ft)	6 April 1939 (1)	6.73°S 106.65°E
Perbakti	stratovolcano	1,699 metres (5,574 ft)	unknown	6.75°S 106.68°E
Kendeng	stratovolcano	1,732 metres (5,682 ft)	Pleistocene	6.768°S 106.526°E
Gede	stratovolcano	2,962 metres (9,718 ft)	13 March 1957 (2)	6.78°S 106.98°E
Pangrango	stratovolcano	3,026 metres (9,928 ft)	unknown	6.770°S 106.96°E
Patuha	stratovolcano	2,434 metres (7,986 ft)	unknown	7.160°S 107.40°E
Wayang-Windu	lava dome	2,182 metres (7,159 ft)	unknown	7.208°S 107.63°E
Malabar	stratovolcano	2,343 metres (7,687 ft)	unknown	7.13°S 107.65°E
Tangkuban Perahu	stratovolcano	2,084 metres (6,837 ft)	26 June 2019 (1)	6.77°S 107.60°E
Papandayan	stratovolcano	2,665 metres (8,743 ft)	11 November 2002 (2)	7.32°S 107.73°E
Kendang	stratovolcano	2,608 metres (8,556 ft)	unknown	7.23°S 107.72°E
Kamojang	stratovolcano	1,730 metres (5,680 ft)	Pleistocene	7.125°S 107.80°E
Guntur	complex volcano	2,249 metres (7,379 ft)	16 October 1847 (2)	7.143°S 107.840°E
Tampomas	stratovolcano	1,684 metres (5,525 ft)	unknown	6.77°S 107.95°E
Galunggung	stratovolcano	2,168 metres (7,113 ft)	9 January 1984 (1)	7.25°S 108.058°E
Talagabodas	stratovolcano	2,201 metres (7,221 ft)	unknown	7.208°S 108.07°E
Karaha	fumarole	1,155 metres (3,789 ft)	unknown	7.12°S 108.08°E
Ciremai	stratovolcano	3,078 metres (10,098 ft)	1951	6.892°S 108.40°E
Slamet	stratovolcano	3,432 metres (11,260 ft)	2014	7.242°S 109.208°E
Dieng	complex volcano	2,565 metres (8,415 ft)	2025	7.20°S 109.92°E
Sundoro	stratovolcano	3,136 metres (10,289 ft)	29 October 1971 (2)	7.30°S 109.992°E
Sumbing	stratovolcano	3,371 metres (11,060 ft)	1730 (?)	7.384°S 110.070°E
Ungaran	stratovolcano	2,050 metres (6,730 ft)	unknown	7.18°S 110.33°E
Telomoyo	stratovolcano	1,894 metres (6,214 ft)	unknown	7.37°S 110.40°E
Merbabu	stratovolcano	3,145 metres (10,318 ft)	1797 (2)	7.45°S 110.43°E
Merapi	stratovolcano	2,968 metres (9,738 ft)	2025 (ongoing)	7.542°S 110.442°E
Muria	stratovolcano	1,625 metres (5,331 ft)	160 BC ± 30 years	6.62°S 110.88°E
Lawu	stratovolcano	3,265 metres (10,712 ft)	28 November 1885 (1)	7.625°S 111.192°E
Wilis	stratovolcano	2,563 metres (8,409 ft)	unknown	7.808°S 111.758°E
Kelud	stratovolcano	1,731 metres (5,679 ft)	13 February 2014 (4)	7.93°S 112.308°E
Kawi–Butak	stratovolcano	2,651 metres (8,698 ft)	unknown	7.92°S 112.45°E
Arjuno–Welirang	stratovolcano	3,339 metres (10,955 ft)	15 August 1952 (0)	7.725°S 112.58°E
Penanggungan	stratovolcano	1,653 metres (5,423 ft)	unknown	7.62°S 112.63°E
Malang Plain	maar	680 metres (2,230 ft)	unknown	8.02°S 112.68°E
Semeru	stratovolcano	3,676 metres (12,060 ft)	2025 (ongoing)	8.108°S 112.92°E
Bromo	stratovolcano	2,329 metres (7,641 ft)	2026 (ongoing)	7.942°S 112.95°E
Lamongan	stratovolcano	1,651 metres (5,417 ft)	5 February 1898 (2)	7.979°S 113.342°E
Lurus	complex volcano	539 metres (1,768 ft)	unknown	7.73°S 113.58°E
Iyang-Argapura	complex volcano	3,088 metres (10,131 ft)	unknown	7.97°S 113.57°E
Raung	stratovolcano	3,332 metres (10,932 ft)	2025 (-)	8.125°S 114.042°E
Ijen	stratovolcano	2,799 metres (9,183 ft)	28 June 1999 (1)	8.058°S 114.242°E
Baluran	stratovolcano	1,247 metres (4,091 ft)	unknown	7.85°S 114.37°E

Note: Height of Krakatau is of Rakata, not of the active Anak Krakatau

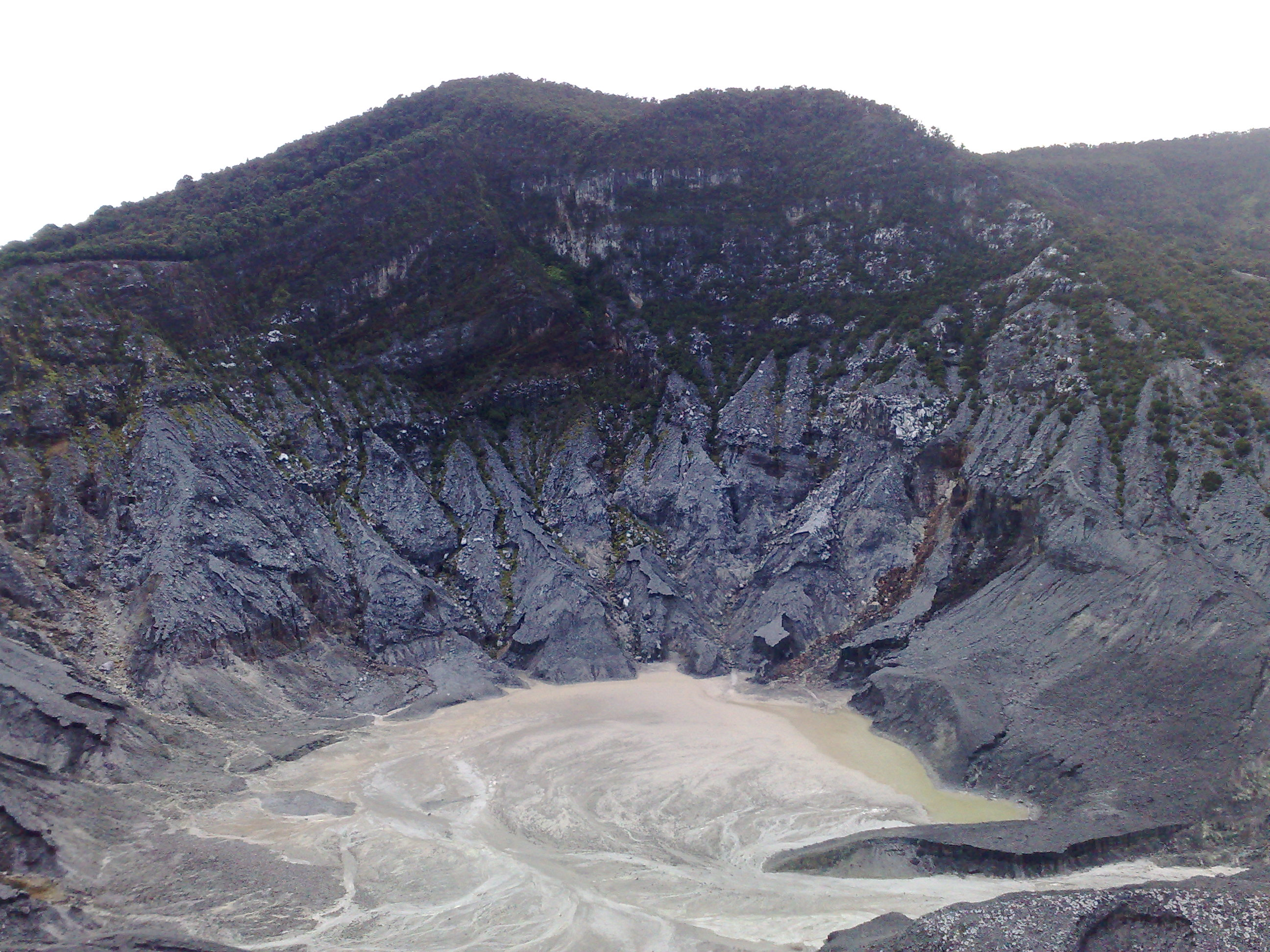
Tangkuban Perahu, taken from above

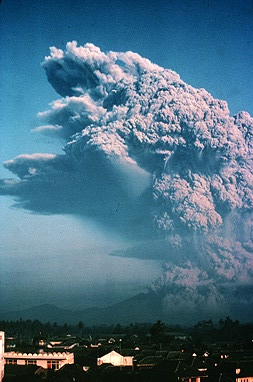
A plinian eruption of Galunggung in 1982

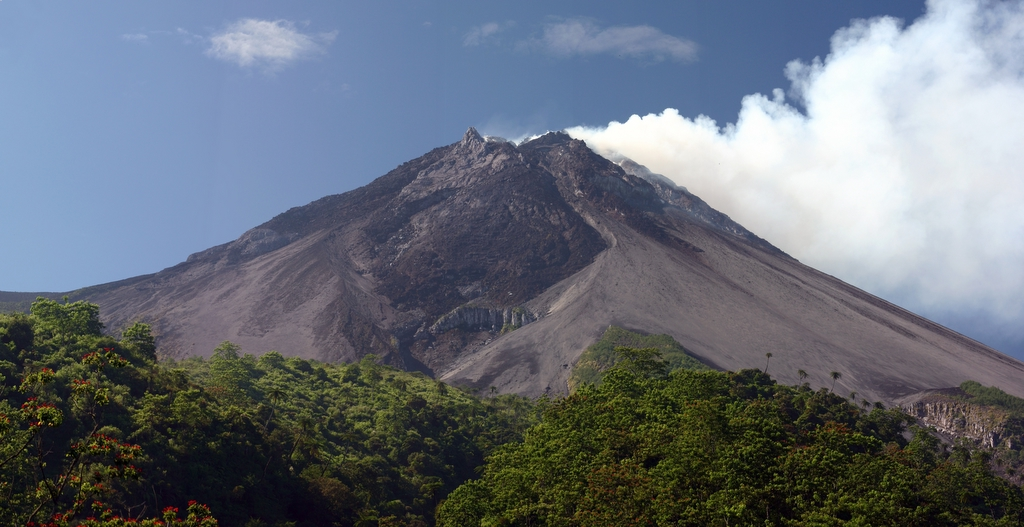
Mount Merapi, one of the most famous volcanoes in Indonesia

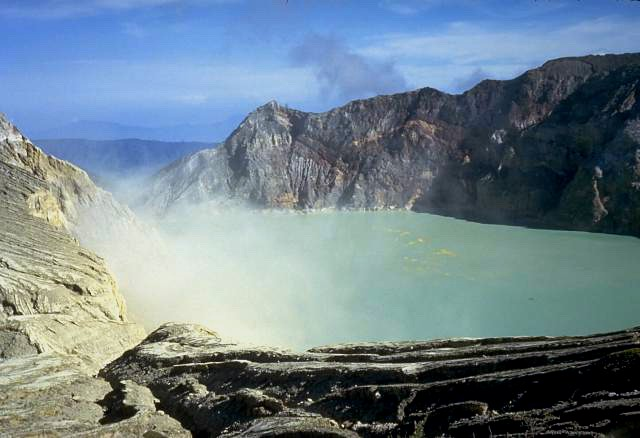
The turquoise coloured sulfuric acid lake on Ijen caldera

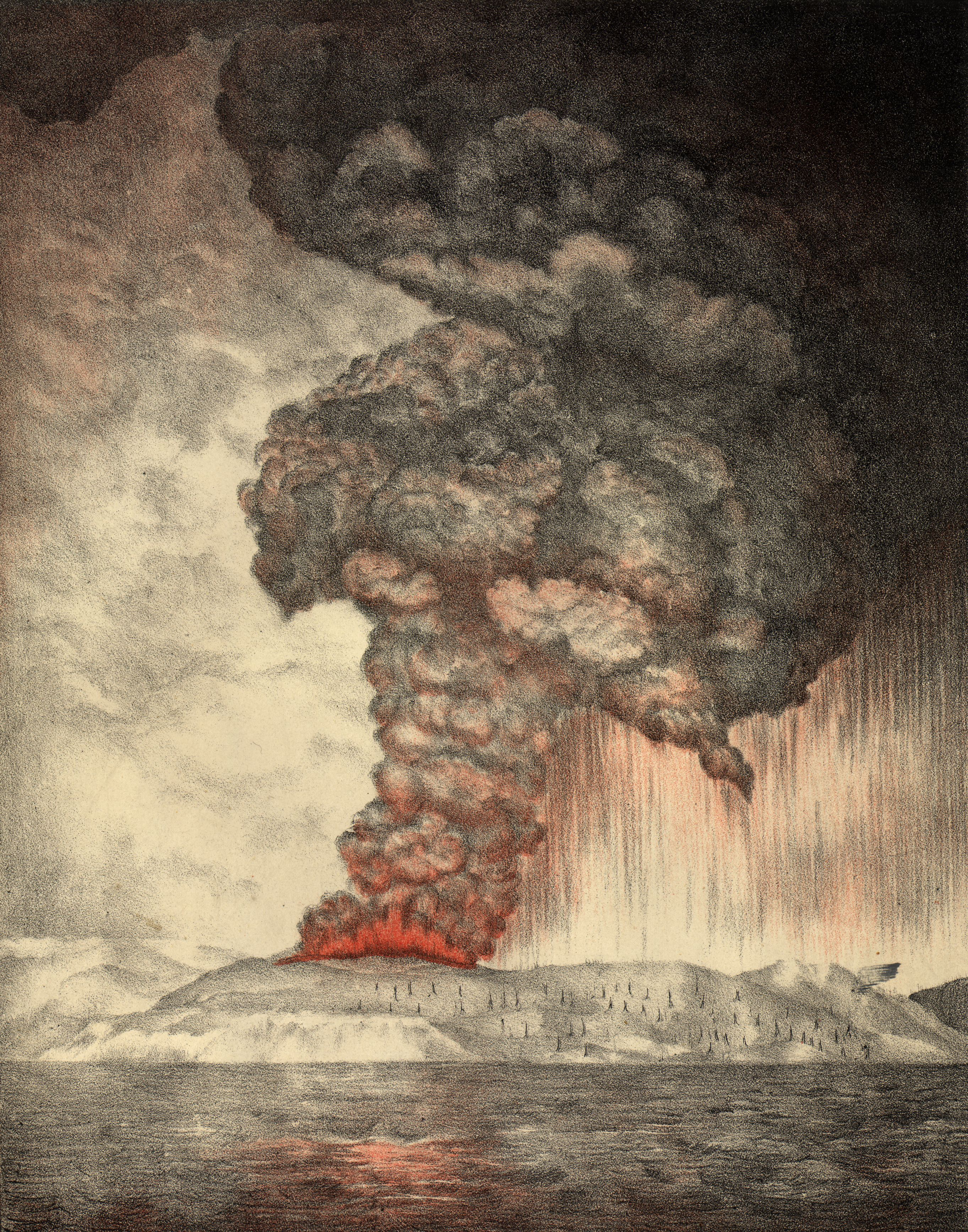
The 1883 eruption of Krakatoa produced the loudest sound.

=== Lesser Sunda Islands ===
The Lesser Sunda Islands is a small archipelago which, from west to east, consists of Bali, Lombok, Sumbawa, Flores, Sumba and the Timor islands; all are located at the edge of the Australian continental shelf. Volcanoes in the area are formed because of oceanic crusts and the movement of the shelf itself. Some volcanoes completely form an island, for instance, the Sangeang Api island. Mount Tambora, on Sumbawa island, erupted on 5 April 1815, with a scale 7 on the VEI and is considered the most violent eruption in recorded history.

Name	Island	Shape	Elevation	Last eruption (VEI)	Coordinates
Merbuk	Bali	unknown	1,386 metres (4,547 ft)	unknown	8.22°S 114.65°E
Bratan	Bali	caldera	2,276 metres (7,467 ft)	unknown	8.28°S 115.13°E
Batur	Bali	caldera	1,717 metres (5,633 ft)	2000 (1)	8.242°S 115.375°E
Agung	Bali	stratovolcano	3,031 metres (9,944 ft)	2019 (3)	8.342°S 115.508°E
Samalas	Lombok	stratovolcano	2,867 metres (9,406 ft)	1257 (7)	8.41°S 116.40°E
Rinjani	Lombok	stratovolcano	3,726 metres (12,224 ft)	2016 (2)	8.42°S 116.47°E
Tambora	Sumbawa	stratovolcano	2,722 metres (8,930 ft)	1967 ± 20 years (0)	8.25°S 118.00°E
Sangeang Api	Sangeang	complex volcano	1,949 metres (6,394 ft)	2019	8.20°S 119.07°E
Wai Sano	Flores	caldera	903 metres (2,963 ft)	unknown	8.72°S 120.02°E
Poco Leok	Flores	unknown	1,675 metres (5,495 ft)	unknown	8.68°S 120.48°E
Ranakah	Flores	lava dome	2,100 metres (6,900 ft)	March 1991 (1)	8.62°S 120.52°E
Inierie	Flores	stratovolcano	2,245 metres (7,365 ft)	8050 BC	8.875°S 120.95°E
Inielika	Flores	complex volcano	1,559 metres (5,115 ft)	11 January 2001 (2)	8.73°S 120.98°E
Ebulobo	Flores	stratovolcano	2,124 metres (6,969 ft)	27 February 1969 (2)	8.82°S 121.18°E
Iya	Flores	stratovolcano	637 metres (2,090 ft)	27 January 1969 (3)	8.897°S 121.645°E
Sukaria	Flores	caldera	1,500 metres (4,900 ft)	unknown	8.792°S 121.77°E
Ndete Napu	Flores	fumarole	750 metres (2,460 ft)	unknown	8.72°S 121.78°E
Kelimutu	Flores	complex volcano	1,639 metres (5,377 ft)	3 June 1968 (1)	8.77°S 121.82°E
Paluweh	Palu'e	stratovolcano	875 metres (2,871 ft)	3 February 1985 (1)	8.32°S 121.708°E
Egon	Flores	stratovolcano	1,703 metres (5,587 ft)	2008	8.67°S 122.45°E
Ilimuda	Flores	stratovolcano	1,100 metres (3,600 ft)	unknown	8.478°S 122.671°E
Lewotobi	Flores	stratovolcano	1,703 metres (5,587 ft)	2025 (ongoing) (3)	8.542°S 122.775°E
Leroboleng	Flores	complex volcano	1,117 metres (3,665 ft)	26 June 2003 (3)	8.358°S 122.842°E
Riang Kotang	Flores	fumarole	200 metres (660 ft)	unknown	8.30°S 122.892°E
Iliboleng	Adonara Island	stratovolcano	1,659 metres (5,443 ft)	June 1993 (1)	8.342°S 123.258°E
Lewotolo	Lembata	stratovolcano	1,423 metres (4,669 ft)	2025 (ongoing)	8.272°S 123.505°E
Ililabalekan	Lembata	stratovolcano	1,018 metres (3,340 ft)	unknown	8.55°S 123.38°E
Iliwerung	Lembata	complex volcano	1,018 metres (3,340 ft)	29 November 2021	8.53°S 123.57°E
Batu Tara	Komba island	stratovolcano	748 metres (2,454 ft)	2007–2015 (2)	7.792°S 123.579°E
Sirung	Pantar Island	complex volcano	862 metres (2,828 ft)	2021	8.508°S 124.13°E
Yersey	–	submarine	−3,800 metres (−12,500 ft)	unknown	7.53°S 123.95°E

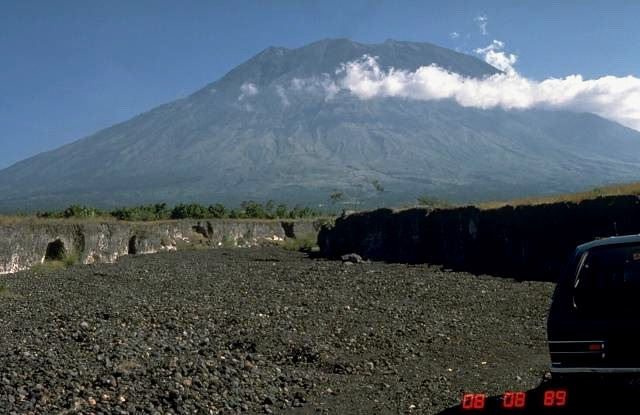
Mount Agung on Bali

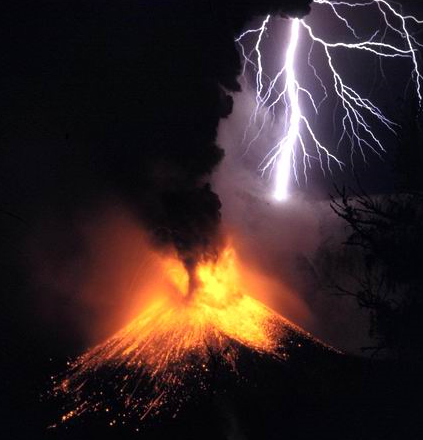
Eruption of Rinjani in 1994

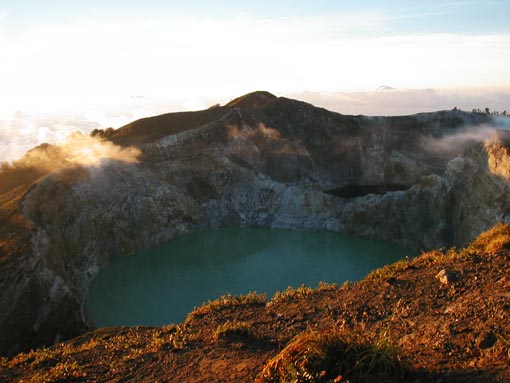
One of three different coloured lakes of Kelimutu

=== Banda Sea ===
The Banda Sea in the south of the Molucca archipelago includes a small group of islands. Three major tectonic plates beneath the sea, the Eurasian plate, Pacific plate and Indo-Australian plate, have been converging since the Mesozoic epoch. Volcanoes in the Banda Sea are mainly islands, but some are submarine volcanoes.

Name	Shape	Elevation	Last eruption (VEI)	Coordinates
Emperor of China	submarine	−2,850 metres (−9,350 ft)	unknown	6.62°S 124.22°E
Nieuwerkerk	submarine	−2,285 metres (−7,497 ft)	unknown	6.60°S 124.675°E
Gunungapi Wetar	stratovolcano	282 metres (925 ft)	1699 (3)	6.642°S 126.65°E
Wurlali	stratovolcano	868 metres (2,848 ft)	3 June 1892 (2)	7.125°S 128.675°E
Teon	stratovolcano	655 metres (2,149 ft)	3 June 1904 (2)	6.92°S 129.125°E
Nila	stratovolcano	781 metres (2,562 ft)	7 May 1968 (1)	6.73°S 129.50°E
Serua	stratovolcano	641 metres (2,103 ft)	18 September 1921 (2)	6.30°S 130.00°E
Manuk	stratovolcano	282 metres (925 ft)	unknown	5.53°S 130.292°E
Banda Api	caldera	640 metres (2,100 ft)	9 May 1988 (3)	4.525°S 129.871°E

=== Sulawesi and Sangihe Islands ===
Four peninsulas dominate the shape of Sulawesi island (formerly known as Celebes). The central part is a high mountainous area, but mostly non-volcanic. Active volcanoes are found in the northern peninsula and continuously stretch to the north to Sangihe Islands. The Sangihe Islands mark the border with the Philippines.

Name	Shape	Elevation	Last eruption (VEI)	Coordinates
Colo	stratovolcano	507 metres (1,663 ft)	18 July 1983 (4)	0.17°S 121.608°E
Ambang	complex volcano	1,795 metres (5,889 ft)	1845 ± 5 years	0.75°N 124.42°E
Soputan	stratovolcano	1,784 metres (5,853 ft)	April 2020	1.108°N 124.73°E
Sempu	caldera	1,549 metres (5,082 ft)	unknown	1.13°N 124.758°E
Tondano	caldera	1,202 metres (3,944 ft)	unknown	1.23°N 124.83°E
Lokon–Empung	stratovolcano	1,580 metres (5,180 ft)	2019	1.358°N 124.792°E
Mahawu	stratovolcano	1,324 metres (4,344 ft)	16 November 1977 (0)	1.358°N 124.858°E
Klabat	stratovolcano	1,995 metres (6,545 ft)	unknown	1.47°N 125.03°E
Tongkoko	stratovolcano	1,149 metres (3,770 ft)	1880 (1)	1.52°N 125.20°E
Ruang	stratovolcano	725 metres (2,379 ft)	April 2024	2.30°N 125.37°E
Karangetang	stratovolcano	1,784 metres (5,853 ft)	2023	2.78°N 125.40°E
Banua Wuhu	submarine	−5 metres (−16 ft)	18 July 1919 (3)	3.138°N 125.491°E
Awu	stratovolcano	1,320 metres (4,330 ft)	2 June 2004 (2)	3.67°N 125.50°E
Submarine 1922	submarine	−5,000 metres (−16,000 ft)	unknown	3.97°N 125.17°E

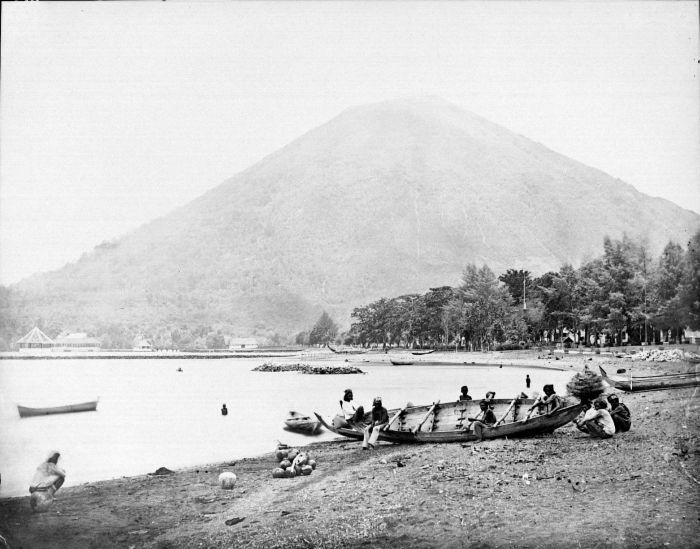
Vuurberg (Dutch: fire mountain, Gunung Api) in Bandanaira

=== Halmahera ===
Halmahera island in the north of Molucca archipelago has been formed by the movement of three tectonic plates resulting in two intersecting mountain ranges, which form four rocky peninsulas separated by three deep bays. A volcanic arc stretches from north to south in the west side of Halmahera, some of which are volcanic islands, for instance, Gamalama and Tidore. Gamalama's island name is Ternate and it has been the centre for spice trading since the Portuguese Empire opened a fort in 1512. Due to its location as the centre for spice trading during the Age of Discovery, historical records of volcanic eruptions in Halmahera have been available as far back as the early 16th century.

Name	Shape	Elevation	Last eruption (VEI)	Coordinates
Tarakan	pyroclastic cone	318 metres (1,043 ft)	unknown	1.83°N 127.83°E
Dukono	complex volcano	1,273 metres (4,177 ft)	1933–2026 (ongoing)	1.68°N 127.88°E
Tobaru	unknown	1,035 metres (3,396 ft)	unknown	1.63°N 127.67°E
Ibu	stratovolcano	1,325 metres (4,347 ft)	2008-2025	1.488°N 127.63°E
Gamkonora	stratovolcano	1,635 metres (5,364 ft)	9 July 2007 (?)	1.38°N 127.53°E
Todoko-Ranu	caldera	979 metres (3,212 ft)	unknown	1.25°N 127.47°E
Jailolo	stratovolcano	1,130 metres (3,710 ft)	unknown	1.08°N 127.42°E
Hiri	stratovolcano	630 metres (2,070 ft)	unknown	0.90°N 127.32°E
Gamalama	stratovolcano	1,715 metres (5,627 ft)	2018	0.80°N 127.33°E
Tidore	stratovolcano	1,730 metres (5,680 ft)	unknown	0.658°N 127.40°E
Mare	stratovolcano	308 metres (1,010 ft)	unknown	0.57°N 127.40°E
Moti	stratovolcano	950 metres (3,120 ft)	unknown	0.45°N 127.40°E
Makian	stratovolcano	1,357 metres (4,452 ft)	29 July 1988 (3)	0.32°N 127.40°E
Tigalalu	stratovolcano	422 metres (1,385 ft)	unknown	0.07°N 127.42°E
Amasing	stratovolcano	1,030 metres (3,380 ft)	unknown	0.53°S 127.48°E
Bibinoi	stratovolcano	900 metres (3,000 ft)	unknown	0.77°S 127.72°E

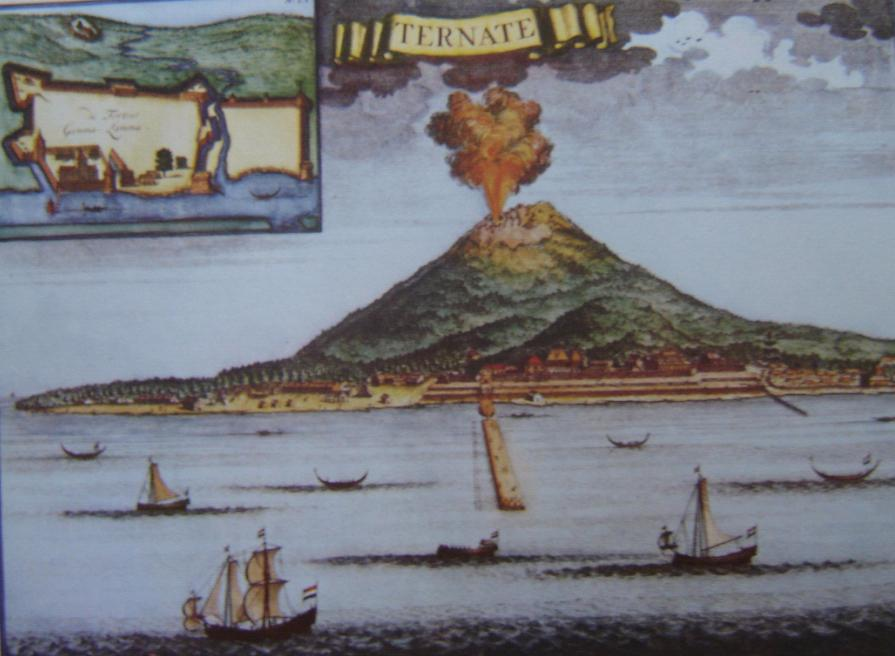
Depiction of Gamalama erupting in the early 1700s with a Portuguese fort shown

== Major eruptions ==
Below is a list of selected major eruptions of volcanoes in Indonesia, sorted chronologically by the starting date of the eruption. Only eruptions with scale 3 or above on VEI are given with known sources and fatalities, except if smaller scale eruptions resulted in some fatalities.

Eruption date	Volcano	Cessation date	VEI	Characteristics	Tsunami	Tephra volume	Fatality	Sources
3 November 2024	Lewotobi Laki-laki	5 November 2024	3	cv,pf,fa,lm	no	N/A	10	
3 December 2023	Marapi	8 December 2023	3	cv,pf,fa,lm	no	N/A	24	
4 December 2021	Semeru	5 December 2021	4	cv,pf,fa,lm	no	N/A	69	
21 December 2018	Anak Krakatoa	10 January 2019	3	cv,se,pf,fa,lm,cc	1–2 m	N/A	437	
13 February 2014	Kelut	15 February 2014	4	cv,cl,pf,ph,ld,lm	no	0.16 km^{3}	4	
3 November 2010	Merapi	8 November 2010	4	cv,pf,ld,lm	no	N/A	353	
10 February 1990	Kelut	March 1990	4	cv,cl,pf,ph,ld,lm	no	0.13 km^{3}	35	
18 July 1983	Colo	December 1983	4	cv,pf,ph	no	N/A	0	
5 April 1982	Galunggung	8 January 1983	4	cv,pf,lf,lm	no	0.37 km^{3} +	68	
6 October 1972	Merapi	March 1985	2	cv,pf,lf,ld,lm	no	0.021 km^{3}	29	
26 April 1966	Kelut	27 April 1966	4	cv,cl,pf,lm	no	0.089 km^{3}	212	
17 March 1963	Agung	27 January 1964	5	cv,pf,lf,lm	no	1 km^{3}	1,148	
31 August 1951	Kelut	31 August 1951	4	cv,cl,pf,lm	no	0.2 km^{3}	7	
25 November 1930	Merapi	September 1931	3	cv,rf,pf,lf,ld,lm	no	0.0017 km^{3}	1,369	
19 May 1919	Kelut	20 May 1919	4	cv,cl,pf,lm	no	0.19 km^{3}	5,110	
7 June 1892	Awu	12 June 1892	3	cv,pf,lm	yes	N/A	1,532	
26 August 1883	Krakatoa	February 1884	6	cv,se,pf,fa,lm,cc	15–42 m	5–8.5 km^{3}	36,600	
15 April 1872	Merapi	21 April 1872	4	cv,pf	no	0.33 km^{3}	200	
2 March 1856	Awu	17 March 1856	3	cv,pf,lm	yes	0.51±0.50 km^{3}	2,806	
8 October 1822	Galunggung	December 1822	5	cv,pf,ld,lm	no	1 km^{3} +	4,011	
10 April 1815	Mount Tambora	15 July 1815	7	cv,pf,cc	1–2 m	160 km^{3}	71,000+	
6 August 1812	Awu	8 August 1812	4	cv,pf,lm	no	0.55±0.50 km^{3}	963	
12 August 1772	Papandayan	12 August 1772	3	cv,ph	no	N/A	2,957	
4 August 1672	Merapi	unknown	3	cv,pf,lm	no	N/A	3,000	
1586	Kelut	unknown	5	cf,cl,lm	no	1 km^{3} +	10,000	
September 1257	Samalas	unknown	7	cv,pf,lm,c;l	likely	120 km^{3}	15,000	
≈ 74,000 BP	Toba	unknown	8	pf,lf,cc	likely	2,800 km^{3}	Possible near extinction of all the human population	

Notes: cv=central vent eruption, pf=pyroclastic flows, lf=lava flows, lm=lahar mudflows, cl=crater lake eruption, ph=phreatic eruption, ld=lava dome extrusion, cc=caldera collapse, se=submarine eruption, fa=fumarole activity, rf=radial fissure eruption.

== See also ==
- List of disasters in Indonesia
- List of earthquakes in Indonesia
- List of ultras of the Malay Archipelago
- Lists of volcanoes
- Volcanism of Indonesia
- Volcanism of Java
