= Mount Nila =

Volcanic island in Maluku, Indonesia

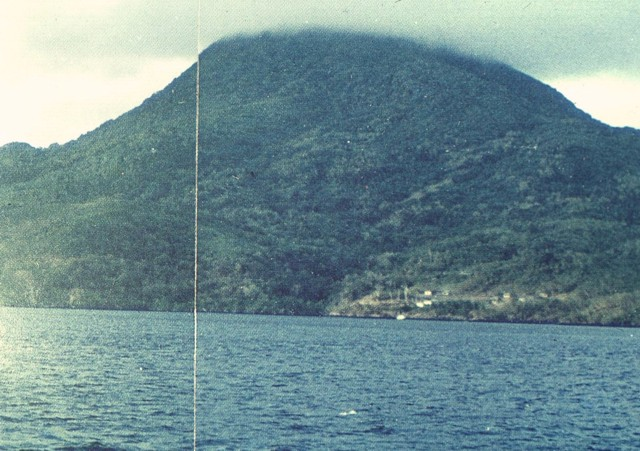

Highest point
- Elevation: 781 m (2,562 ft)
- Coordinates: 6.73°S 129.50°E

Geography
- Location: Banda Sea, Indonesia

Geology
- Mountain type: Stratovolcano
- Volcanic arc: Banda Arc
- Last eruption: May to June 1968

Nila volcano forms completely an isolated 5 × 6 km wide of island with the same name in the Barat Daya Islands of the Banda Sea, Indonesia. The volcano comprises a low caldera with its rims breach into the sea surface on the south and the east side. The dominantly andesitic volcano contains a young forested cone at the elevation of 781 m height.

Mount Nila is a stratovolcano, and caused the abandonment of a Rumadai village when it erupted in 1968.

== See also ==
- List of volcanoes in Indonesia
