= Lubukraya =

Andesitic stratovolcano on Sumatra, Indonesia

Highest point
- Elevation: 1,862 m (6,109 ft)
- Coordinates: 1.478°N 99.209°E

Geography
- Location: Sumatra, Indonesia

Geology
- Mountain type: stratovolcano
- Volcanic arc: Sunda Arc
- Last eruption: unknown

Lubukraya is an andesitic stratovolcano on Sumatra island, Indonesia. It has a broad crater breached to the south and a lava dome at the southern foot of the volcano.

== See also ==
- List of volcanoes in Indonesia
