= Mount Egon =

Stratovolcano in Flores, Indonesia

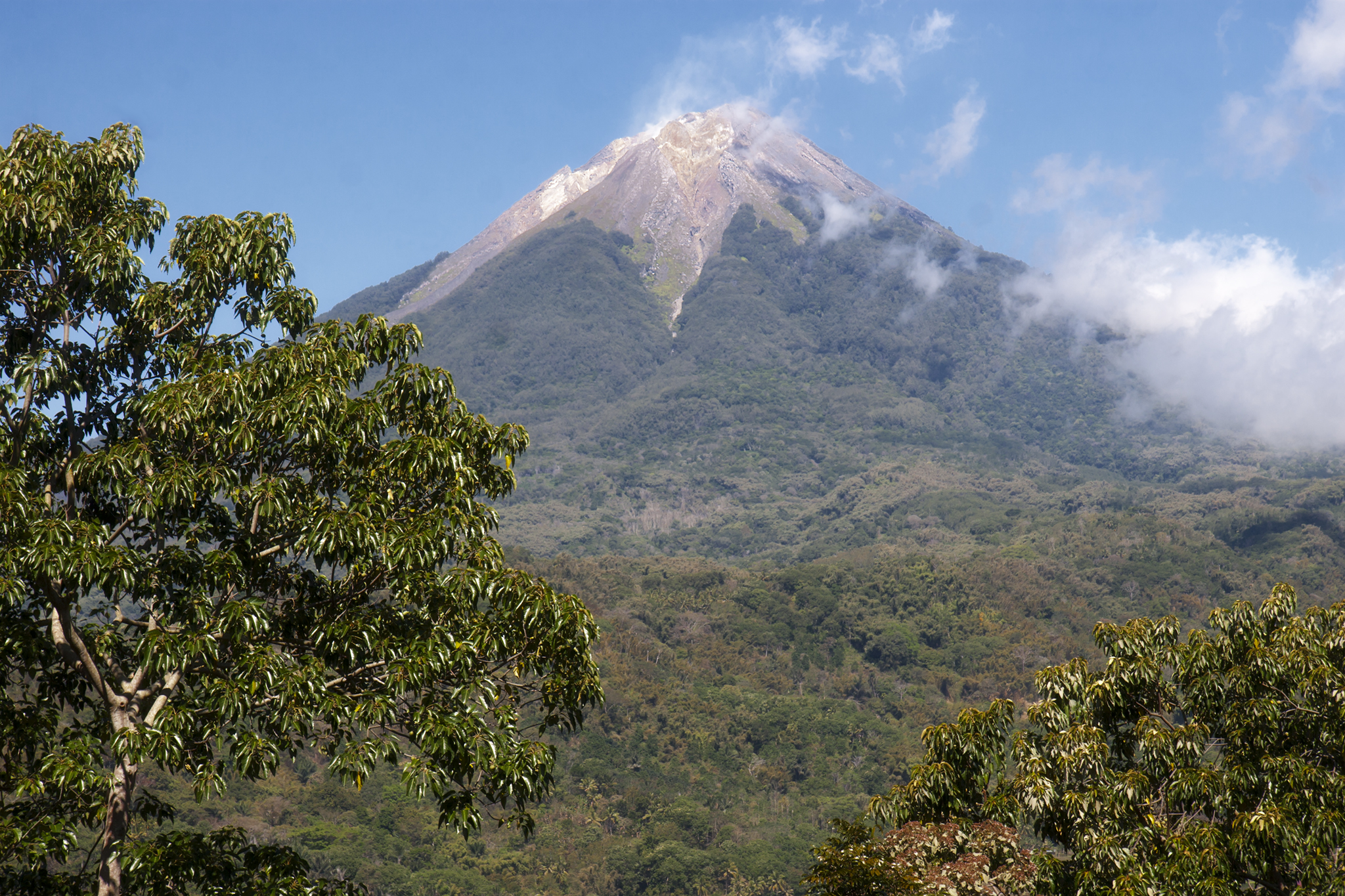

Highest point
- Elevation: 1,661 m (5,449 ft)
- Listing: Ribu
- Coordinates: 08°40′S 122°27′E

Geography
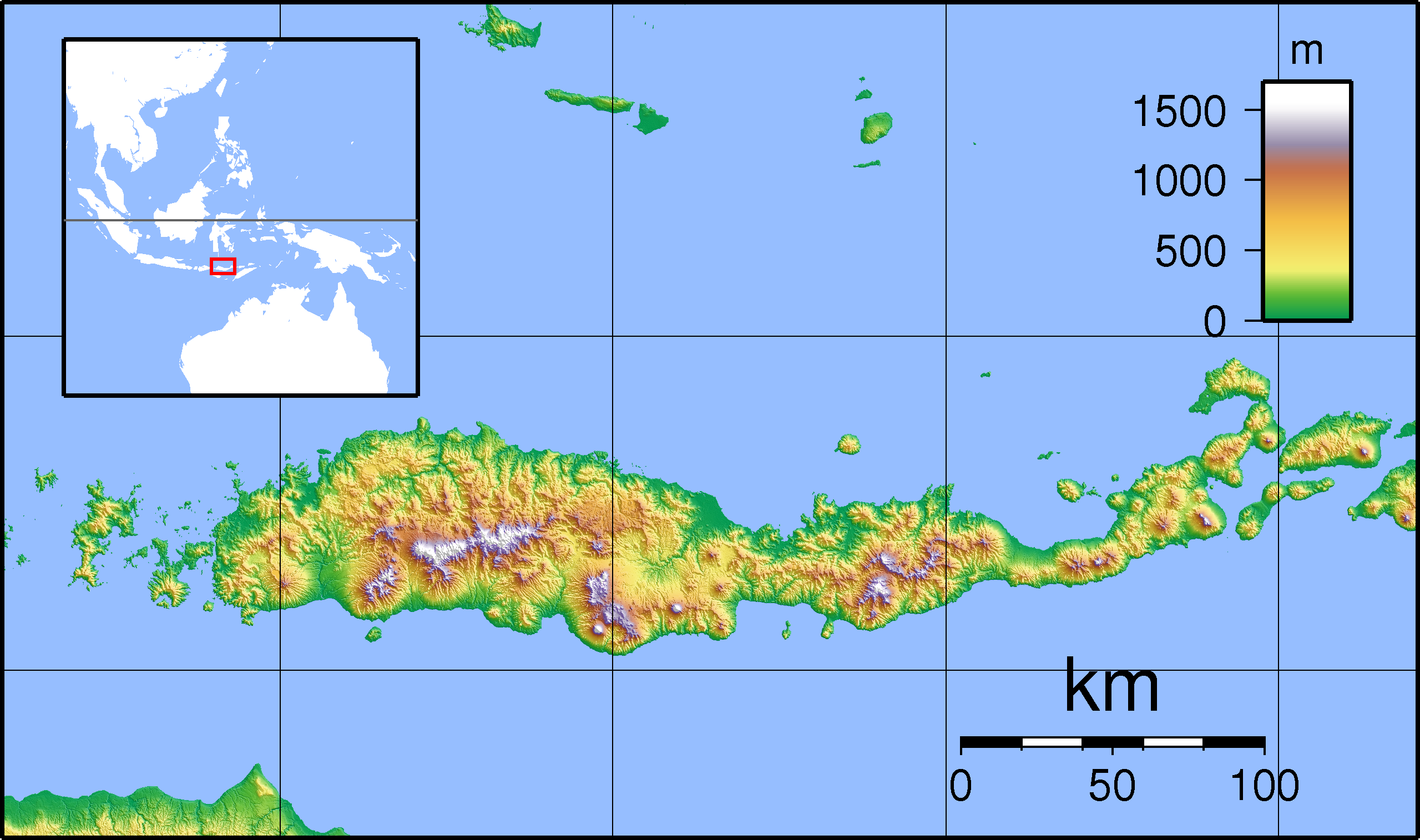
- Location within Flores
- Location: Flores Island, Indonesia

Geology
- Mountain type: Stratovolcano
- Volcanic arc: Sunda Arc
- Last eruption: April 2008

Mount Egon (Gunung Egon, sometimes also called Gunung Namang) is a stratovolcano located in the southeastern part of the island of Flores, Indonesia in the area of Maumere bay. A landslide during the eruption on 29 January 2004 forced 6,000 people to evacuate the area. Activity of Gunung Egon on 15 April 2008 forced thousands of people to evacuate. Quakes and fumes from the volcano have been occurring since November 2010, designating Egon as one of 11 volcanoes in Indonesia on the highest level alert.

== See also ==
- List of volcanoes in Indonesia
