= Imun =

Small dacitic and rhyolitic volcano south of Lake Toba

Highest point
- Elevation: 1,505 m (4,938 ft)
- Coordinates: 2.158°N 98.93°E

Geography
- Location: Sumatra, Indonesia

Geology
- Mountain type: Lava cone
- Volcanic arc: Sunda Arc
- Last eruption: Pleistocene age

Imun is a small dacitic and rhyolitic lava cone at 20 km (12,42 miles) south of Lake Toba and 6 km (3,72 miles) north of the town of Situmeang. Due to its closeness to the much larger caldera of Lake Toba, there is not much information about this small volcano.

== See also ==
- List of volcanoes in Indonesia
