= Mount Tarakan =

Volcano in Halmahera, Indonesia

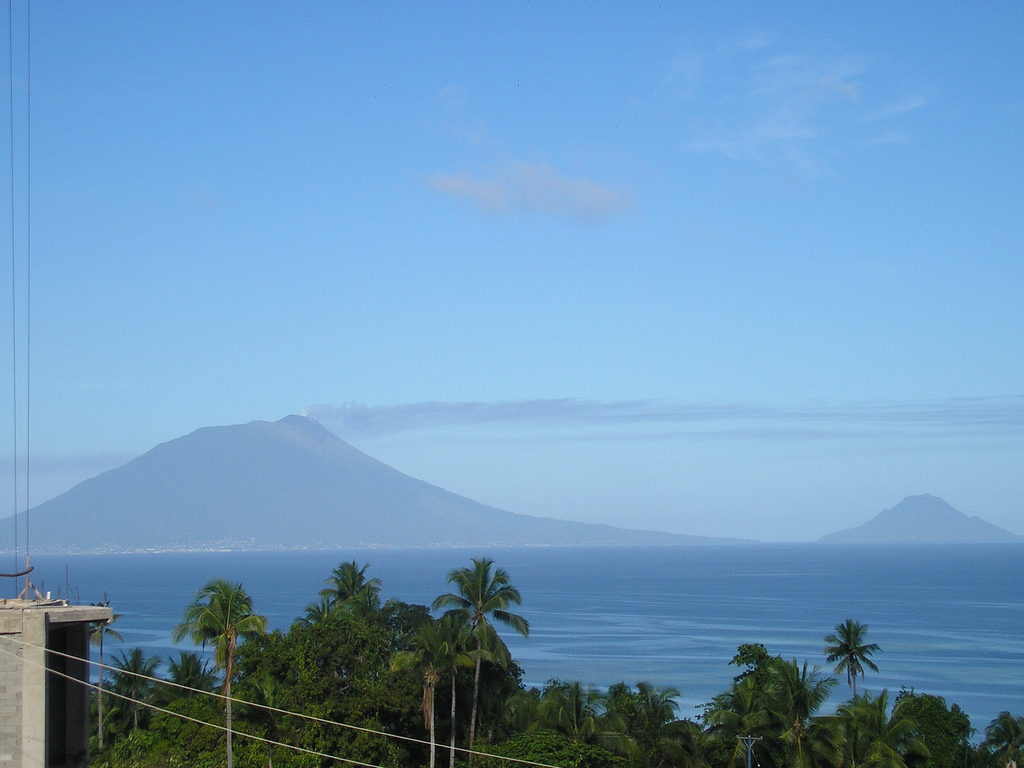

Highest point
- Elevation: 318 m (1,043 ft)
- Listing: List of volcanoes in Indonesia
- Coordinates: 1°49′48″N 127°49′48″E

Geography
- Location within Indonesia
- Location: Halmahera, Indonesia

Geology
- Mountain type: Pyroclastic cones
- Last eruption: unknown

Tarakan volcano is located in Indonesia's Halmahera island, near the shore of Galela Bay north east of Dukono volcano. Tarakan consists of two large cinder cones, namely Tarakan Lamo (large Tarakan) and Tarakan Itji (small Tarakan).
