= Mount Pendan =

Volcano in Indonesia

- Location within Sumatra

Highest point
- Elevation: 2,175 m (7,136 ft)
- Coordinates: 2.82°S 102.02°E

Geography
- Location: Sumatra, Indonesia

Geology
- Mountain type: Volcano
- Volcanic arc: Sunda Arc

Mount Pendan is an active volcano on Sumatra, Indonesia. There is little known about the volcano. Mount Pendan has a height of 2,175 meters above sea level.

As sources and references about Mount Pendan are solely based on the Smithsonian listing which lacks further information, there are doubts about the volcano's existence. The coordinates reveal a mountain covered by dense forest. It is unclear whether Pendan is an actual volcano, a misidentified mountain or valley which may or may not be of volcanic origin, or a copyright trap fabricated by the Smithsonian Institution.

== See also ==
- List of volcanoes in Indonesia
