= Belirang-Beriti =

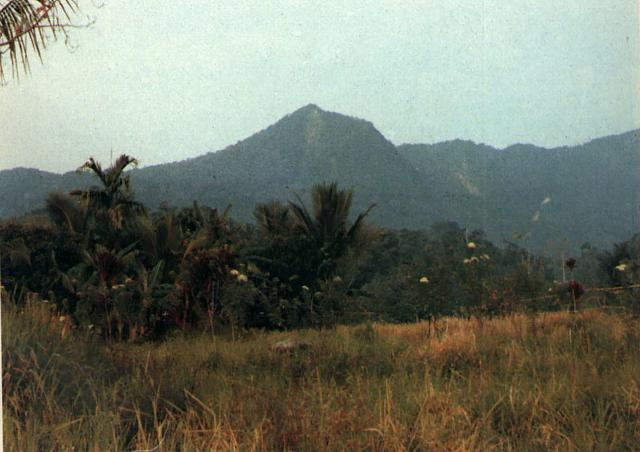
- The compound Belirang-Beriti volcano rises above Mubai village.

Highest point
- Elevation: 1,958 m (6,424 ft)
- Coordinates: 2°49′S 102°11′E

Geography
- Location within Sumatra
- Location: Sumatra, Indonesia
- Parent range: Bukit Barisan

Geology
- Mountain type: Complex volcano
- Volcanic arc: Sunda Arc

Belirang-Beriti is a volcanic complex that rises above the Semalako Plain in the south-west of Sumatra, Indonesia. It contains a 1.2 km-wide volcanic crater.

== See also ==
- List of volcanoes in Indonesia
