= Mount Sumbing (Sumatra) =

Stratovolcano in Sumatra, Indonesia

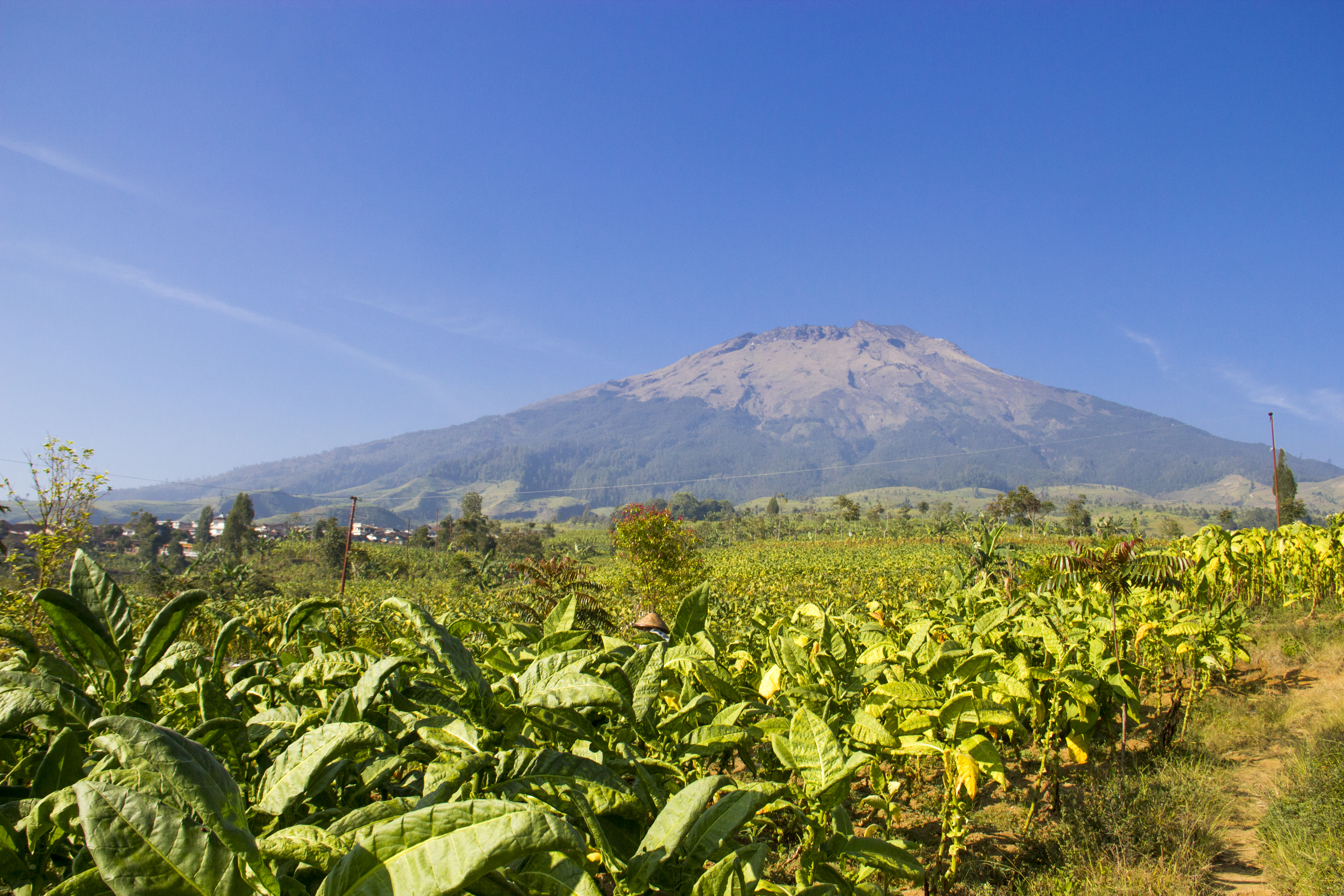

Highest point
- Elevation: 2,507 m (8,225 ft)
- Coordinates: 2.414°S 101.728°E

Geography
- Location: Sumatra, Indonesia

Geology
- Mountain type: Stratovolcano
- Volcanic arc: Sunda Arc
- Last eruption: May to June 1921

Mount Sumbing is a stratovolcano in the central region of Sumatra, Indonesia. The volcano has a complicated summit region with several craters and a 180 m-long (590 ft) crater lake.

== Eruptions ==
Only two known historical eruptions have taken place, one in 1909 and another in 1921. Hot springs occurred in the south-west foot of the volcano.

== See also ==
- List of volcanoes in Indonesia
