= Mount Ibu =

Volcano in Indonesia

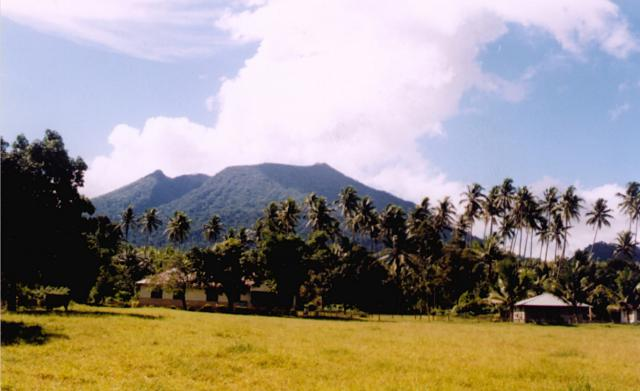

Highest point
- Elevation: 1,325 m (4,347 ft)
- Listing: Ribu
- Coordinates: 1.488°N 127.63°E

Geography
- Location within Indonesia
- Location: Halmahera, Indonesia

Geology
- Mountain type: Stratovolcano
- Last eruption: 19 August 2026

Climbing
- Easiest route: 84

Mount Ibu (Indonesian: Gunung Ibu) is a stratovolcano at the north-west coast of Halmahera island, Indonesia. The summit is truncated and contains nested craters. The inner crater is 1 km (0.62 mi) wide and 400 m (1,312 ft) deep, while the outer is 1.2 km (0.75 mi) wide. A large parasitic cone is at the north-east of the summit and a smaller one at the south-west. The latter feeds a lava flow down the west flank. A group of maars are on the western and northern side of the volcano. Mount Ibu sits within the Pacific Ocean's "Ring of Fire" that has 127 active volcanoes.

== Latest activity ==
In August 2009, the Volcanological Survey of Indonesia raised the eruption alert level for Ibu to Orange/III.

In 2023, a total of 21,100 eruptions were recorded from the volcano, making it the second most active volcano in Indonesia.

On 16 May 2024, the Volcanological Survey of Indonesia raised its highest alert level (Red/IV) for Mount Ibu following another series of eruptions. As a result, seven villages were evacuated.

On 1 June 2024, Mount Ibu erupted at 11:03 WIT (02:03 GMT) for 265 seconds, producing a five kilometer (3 mile) high ash plume that dispersed towards the southwest and deposited ash on the village of Gam Ici, where many evacuees displaced by previous eruptions had been relocated. The Volcanological Survey of Indonesia warned of a potential for flash flooding and lahar flow in the region, and recommended that people move at least seven kilometers (~4.35 miles) away from the crater.

On 6 June 2024, Mount Ibu erupted three more times, producing ash clouds as tall as 1,200 meters (4,000 feet).

On 11 January 2025, Mount Ibu erupted again, spewing hot lava and a towering column of smoke and ash reaching up to four kilometres. From 1 January to 19 January 2025, the volcano erupted 1,079 times, forcing authorities to raise its highest alert level again.

On 18 August 2026, Mount Ibu erupted thrice within a span of three hours.

== See also ==
- List of volcanoes in Indonesia
- Volcanological Survey of Indonesia
