= Sorikmarapi =

Stratovolcano on Sumatra, Indonesia

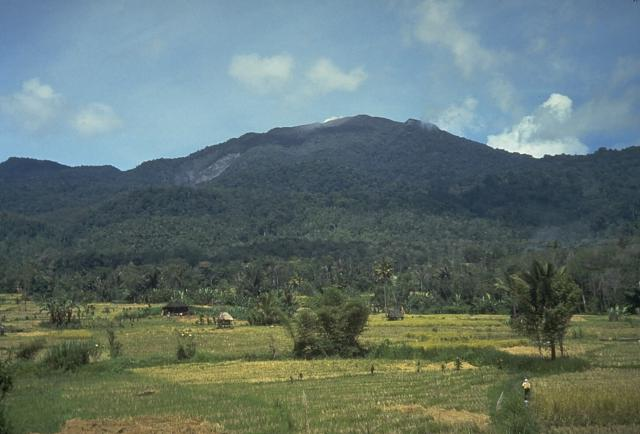

Highest point
- Elevation: 2,145 m (7,037 ft)
- Coordinates: 0.686°N 99.539°E

Geography
- Location: Sumatra, Indonesia

Geology
- Mountain type: stratovolcano
- Volcanic arc: Sunda Arc
- Last eruption: July 1986

Sorikmarapi is a highly vegetated stratovolcano on Sumatra island, Indonesia. It has a 600 m wide of crater lake at the summit and some sulfur deposits. A small parasitic crater, called Danau Merah, is found at the upper southeast flank of the mountain and several solfatara fields at the eastern flank. During the 19th and 20th century, small phreatic eruptions occurred.

Kaishan Compressor, a Chinese company geothermal project accident killed 5 in 2021 by leaking hydrogen sulfide gas at the volcano.

== See also ==
- List of volcanoes in Indonesia
