= Sarik-Gajah =

Highest point
- Elevation: unknown
- Coordinates: 0.08°N 100.20°E

Geography
- Location: Sumatra, Indonesia

Geology
- Mountain type: Pyroclastic cones
- Volcanic arc: Sunda Arc

Sarik-Gajah are two pyroclastic cones right at the equator line on Sumatra island, Indonesia. The first cone is Sarik, an andesitic/basaltic vegetated cone. The other is andesic-dacitic Gajah cone, 10 km south-west of the first one and it contains lava flow. No was eruptive history ever recorded from this volcanic complex.

== See also ==
- List of volcanoes in Indonesia
