= Ndete Napu =

Highest point
- Elevation: 750 m (2,460 ft)
- Coordinates: 8.72°S 121.78°E

Geography
- Location: Flores, Indonesia

Geology
- Mountain type: fumarole field
- Volcanic arc: Sunda Arc

Ndete Napu is an active volcano field, containing fumarole (volcanic vent and high-pressure water fountains of hot gases and vapors) and mudpots, along the Lowomelo river valley in the center of Flores island of the Lesser Sunda Islands in the eastern half of Indonesia in the East Nusa Tenggara Province. Based on its thermal activity, it is officially listed as an active volcano.

== See also ==
- List of volcanoes in Indonesia
