= Poco Leok =

Volcano in Indonesia

Pocok Leok

Highest point
- Elevation: 1,675 m (5,495 ft)
- Coordinates: 8.68°S 120.48°E

Geography
- Location: Flores, Indonesia

Geology
- Volcanic arc: Sunda Arc

Pocok Leok is a volcano in the western side of Flores island, Indonesia. The volcano was considered to be an irregular-shaped caldera, but evidence about caldera is problematic. No pyroclastic flow deposits associated with the caldera and its geological records are poorly known. However, Pocok Leok is listed in the active volcano list of Indonesia because of four fumarole activities in the area.

== See also ==
- List of volcanoes in Indonesia
