= Peuët Sagoë =

Volcanic complex in northwestern Sumatra

Peuet Sague
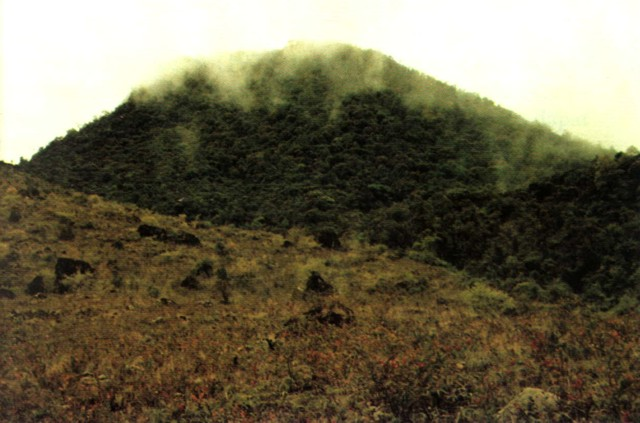
- Thin clouds draping one of four summit peaks of Peuet Sague volcano in NW Sumatra

Highest point
- Elevation: 2,785 m (9,137 ft)
- Listing: Ultra; Ribu
- Coordinates: 4.903°N 96.289°E

Geography
- Location: northwest of Sumatra, Indonesia

Geology
- Mountain type: Complex volcano
- Volcanic arc: Sunda Arc
- Last eruption: December 2000

Peuet Sague is a volcanic complex in the northwestern part of Sumatra, Indonesia. The name peuet sagoe in Acehnese means four square. The location of the volcanic complex is isolated that needs several journeys on foot from the nearest village to reach the mountain. There are four summits in the complex that all of them are located in Pidie Regency, Aceh Province. One of the lava dome is called Mount Tutung and it has 70 metres (230 feet) diameter and 80 meters (262.5 feet) deep of an active crater.

== Eruptive history ==
The first recorded eruption took place between 1918 and 1921. Due to its remoteness, the volcanic complex is infrequently visited. Little is known about its eruption history prior the 20th century.

In the morning of 26 April 1998, an ash eruption was spotted by a pilot of the Garuda Indonesia airline. The pilot saw the ash around 3 km (9,840 feet) altitude when he flew over 7 km (23,000 feet) altitude. The local Indonesia Air Force chief confirmed the eruption from a fighter pilot who also spotted fire and thick smoke from the nearby forest. This was actually the second eruption from the first one on 19 April 1998, but the first eruption was obscured by a thick smoke from forest fires. Officials from the Ministry of Mines and Energy reported a phreatic eruption. The active crater was near Mount Tutung, 2 km (1.2 mi) west of the Peuet Sague's peak. Nobody was injured from this eruption because the nearest village is 8 km (5.0 mi) west of the mountain.

From 9 March 1999 until 24 May 1999, volcanic activity in the Peuet Sague complex increased. Local people heard explosion noises about 20 times per day. Tectonic events increased and an eruption emitted white-gray ash up until 200 metres (656 feet) height. A white plume was observed between 10 and 20 metres (30–65 feet) height. All activities were then diminished.

The 1999 activity was later discovered to be continued until late of December 2000, although at a decreased level. The activity monitoring at that time was stopped due to a malfunctioning seismograph. Plumes continued to rise in June up to heights of 20 metres. Rumbling was heard on 18 occasions, and plumes continued to rise through 14 June 1999. A renewed activity began on 25 December 2000 with three explosions. Ash was spread over a relatively large area. Reports of ashfall occurred on Geumpang, Lutung, Mane and Bangke villages, up to 20 km (12 mi) away. A glowing lava flows at night was also reported. The 2000 eruption was estimated at scale 2 on Volcanic Explosivity Index.

== See also ==
- List of volcanoes in Indonesia
