= Riang Kotang =

Fumarole field is located near the eastern tip of Flores island, Indonesia

Highest point
- Elevation: 200 m (660 ft)
- Coordinates: 8.30°S 122.892°E

Geography
- Location: Flores, Indonesia

Geology
- Mountain type: fumarole field
- Volcanic arc: Sunda Arc

Riang Kotang fumarole field is located near the eastern tip of Flores island, Indonesia. Two fumarole areas are found along the saddle foot of the volcano. Hot springs appear along the southwest side of the Oka Bay and Hadang Bay on the west coast.

== See also ==
- List of volcanoes in Indonesia
