= Mount Sekincau =

Volcano with two calderas on the island of Sumatra

Sekincau Belirang

Highest point
- Elevation: 1,719 m (5,640 ft)
- Coordinates: 5.12°S 104.32°E

Geography
- Location: Sumatra, Indonesia
- Parent range: Bukit Barisan

Geology
- Mountain type: caldera
- Volcanic arc: Sunda Arc

Sekincau is a volcano with two calderas, Belirang (2 km wide) and Balak (2.5 km wide), located in the south of Sumatra, Indonesia. A 300 m wide of crater is found at the summit. Fumarole activities are found at the foot of calderas.

== See also ==
- List of volcanoes in Indonesia
