= Todoko-Ranu =

Twin caldera complex on Halmehara island, Indonesia

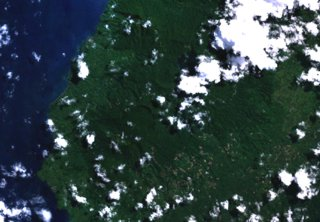

Highest point
- Elevation: 979 m (3,212 ft)
- Coordinates: 1.25°N 127.47°E

Geography
- Location: Halmahera, Indonesia

Geology
- Mountain type: Caldera

Todoko-Ranu is a twin caldera complex on Halmahera island, Indonesia. The 2 km wide of lava-filled Todoko caldera is at the south of the 2 × 2.8 km wide of Ranu caldera. The Ranu caldera contains a volcanic cone Sahu and a caldera lake at the north side. No historical records are found from the caldera complex.

== See also ==
- List of volcanoes in Indonesia
