= Mount Sirung =

Volcano in East Nusa Tenggara, Indonesia

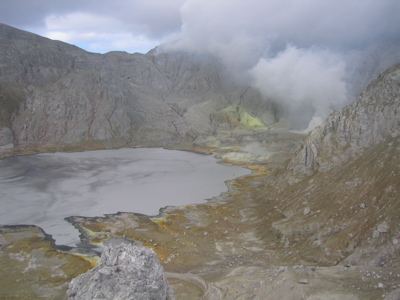
- Sirung caldera in 2004

Highest point
- Elevation: 862 m (2,828 ft)
- Prominence: 862 m (2,828 ft)
- Coordinates: 8°31′S 124°08′E

Geography
- Location: Pantar Island, East Nusa Tenggara (Indonesia)

Geology
- Mountain type: Complex volcano
- Volcanic arc: Sunda Arc
- Last eruption: July 21, 2021

Mount Sirung (Indonesian: Gunung Sirung) is an active volcano complex volcano located on Pantar Island in the Alor archipelago of the eastern Indonesian province of Nusa Tenggara Timor. The crater rim can be reached by an easy hike from the village of Kakamauta. Inside the crater is a large sulphurous crater lake and several active steam vents. The last major eruption occurred 1970, and regular gas and clastic eruptions have occurred since 2004. A small eruption beginning May 12, 2012 triggered an evacuation of an area within a 1.5 km radius of the caldera.

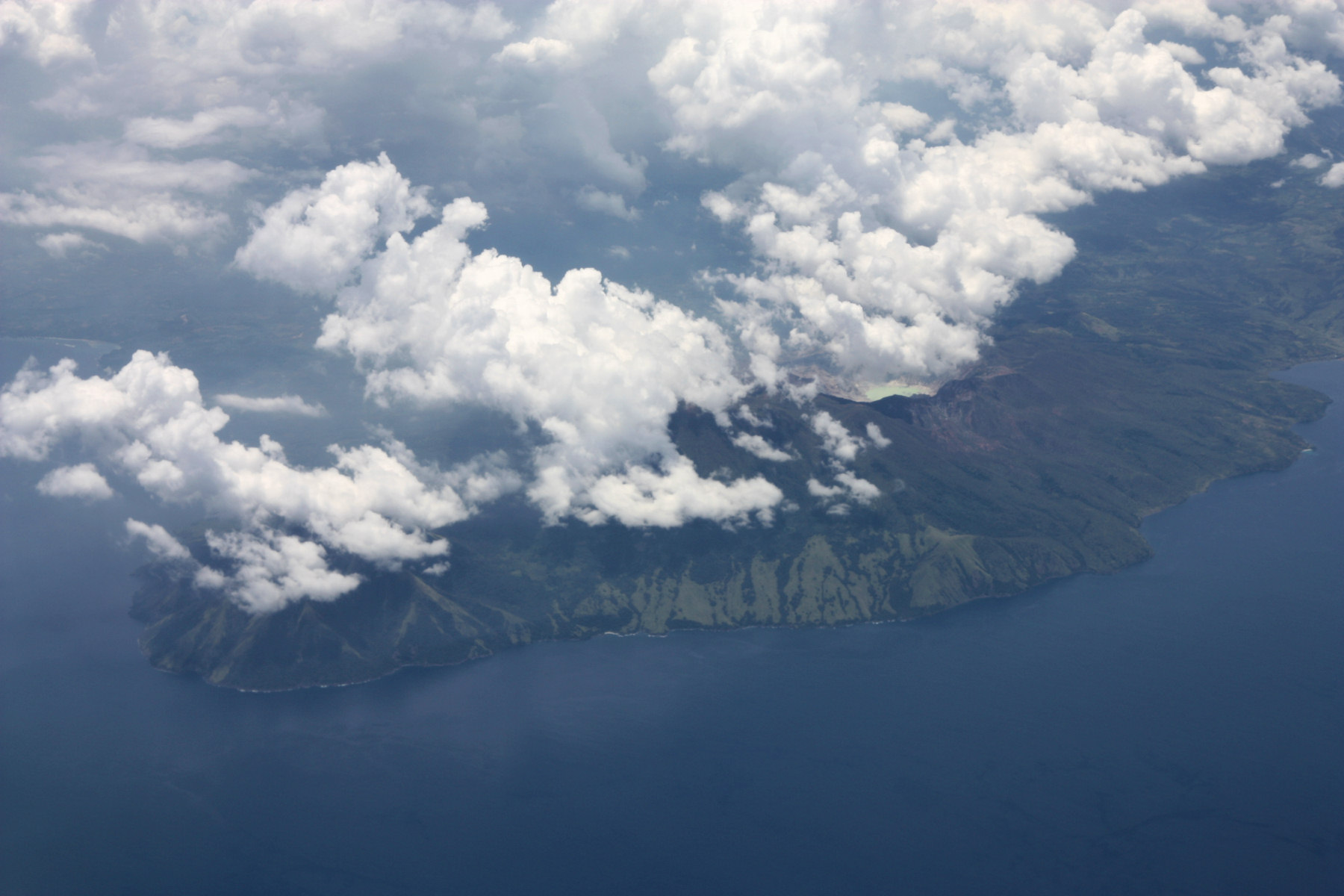
Aerial view

== See also ==
- List of volcanoes in Indonesia
