= Bibinoi Hill =

Group of volcanoes

Highest point
- Elevation: 900 m (3,000 ft)
- Coordinates: 0.77°S 127.72°E

Geography
- Location: Bacan, Indonesia

Geology
- Mountain type: Stratovolcanoes
- Last eruption: Unknown

Bibinoi Hill (Indonesian: Bukit Bibinoi) is a group of volcanoes, located on Bacan island at the west side of Halmahera island, Indonesia. The volcano contains three andesitic stratovolcanoes. Two of them are called Songsu and Lansa.

== See also ==
- List of volcanoes in Indonesia
