= Helatoba-Tarutung =

Group of sulfurous hot springs south of Lake Toba

Highest point
- Elevation: 1,100 m (3,600 ft)
- Coordinates: 2.03°N 98.93°E

Geography
- Location: North Sumatra, Indonesia

Geology
- Mountain type: fumarole field
- Last eruption: Pleistocene

Helatoba-Tarutung is a group of sulfurous hot springs in the south of Lake Toba, North Sumatra, Indonesia. It stretches 40 km along the Renun-Toru geological fault zone. The last eruption took place during the Pleistocene age.

== See also ==
- List of volcanoes in Indonesia
