= Mount Teon =

Volcanic island in Indonesia

Highest point
- Elevation: 728 m (2,388 ft)
- Coordinates: 6.92°S 129.125°E

Geography
- Location: Banda Sea, Indonesia

Geology
- Mountain type: Stratovolcano
- Volcanic arc: Banda Arc
- Last eruption: June 1904

Mount Teon is an elongated island in the Banda Sea, Indonesia. Explosive eruptions have been recorded from the volcano since the seventeenth century.

== See also ==
- List of volcanoes in Indonesia
