= Submarine 1922 =

Submarine volcano in the Sangihe Islands of Indonesia

- Summit depth: 5,000 metres (16,000 ft)

Location
- Location: Celebes Sea, near Sangihe Islands
- Coordinates: 3°58′N 124°10′E
- Country: Indonesia

Geology
- Type: submarine volcano?

Submarine 1922 a submarine volcano was found in 1922 after a series of underwater earthquakes that started in 1912, in the Sangihe Islands of Indonesia.

== See also ==
- List of volcanoes in Indonesia
