= Wai Sano =

Volcano in Flores, Indonesia

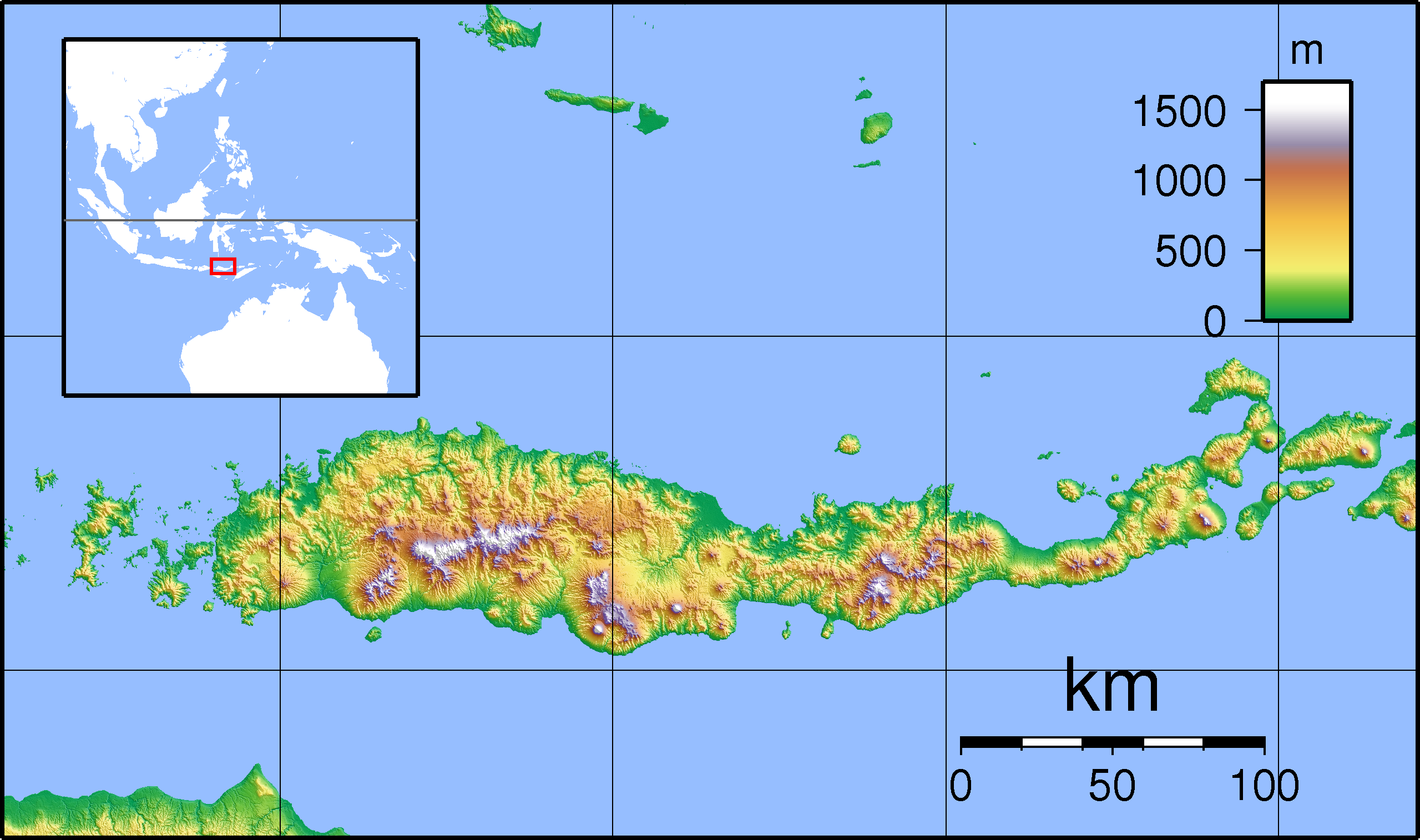
- Location within Flores

Highest point
- Elevation: 903 m (2,963 ft)
- Listing: List of volcanoes in Indonesia
- Coordinates: 8°43′S 120°01′E

Geography
- Location: Flores Island, Indonesia

Geology
- Rock age: Holocene
- Mountain type: Caldera
- Volcanic arc: Sunda Arc
- Last eruption: Unknown

Wai Sano is a volcano located in the western part of the island of Flores, Indonesia. Wai Sano consists of an elliptical caldera about one mile (2.5 km) wide, containing a lake 260 meters below the 903 meter caldera rim, itself part of Mount Umpu Rua. Two fumaroles are located on the southeastern shore of the lake. No historical eruptions are known.
