= Mount Hutapanjang =

Stratovolcano in Sumatra, Indonesia

Highest point
- Elevation: 2,021 m (6,631 ft)
- Coordinates: 2.33°S 101.60°E

Geography
- Location: Sumatra, Indonesia

Geology
- Rock age: Holocene
- Mountain type: Stratovolcano
- Volcanic arc: Sunda Arc
- Last eruption: Unknown

Hutapanjang is a stratovolcano on Sumatra, Indonesia. Little is known about this volcano.

== See also ==
- List of volcanoes in Indonesia
