= Mount Merbuk =

Mountain in Indonesia

Merbuk

Highest point
- Elevation: 1,386 m (4,547 ft)
- Coordinates: 8.22°S 114.65°E

Geography
- Location: Bali, Indonesia

Geology
- Volcanic arc: Sunda Arc

Mount Merbuk is a 1,386-metre-high (4,547 ft) volcano in Bali, Indonesia.

== See also ==
- List of volcanoes in Indonesia
