= Hulubelu =

Caldera in South-Eastern Sumatra

- Location within Indonesia

Highest point
- Elevation: 1,040 m (3,410 ft)
- Listing: List of volcanoes in Indonesia
- Coordinates: 5°21′S 104°36′E

Geography
- Location: Sumatra, Indonesia

Geology
- Mountain type: Caldera
- Last eruption: Unknown

Hulubelu is an elliptical, 4-km-long caldera the floor of which is about 700 m above sea level and is surrounded by steep walls in South-Eastern Sumatra. Post-caldera volcanism formed central cones and basaltic and andesitic flank volcanoes. Solfataric areas, mud volcanoes, and hot springs occur at several locations, but it is not known for sure when the volcano last erupted, possibly in the Holocene epoch. Thermal areas are aligned North East of and parallel to the Great Sumatran fault, which runs the entire length of the island of Sumatra.
