= Bratan (volcano) =

Three caldera lakes at the north of Bali island

Bratan Caldera
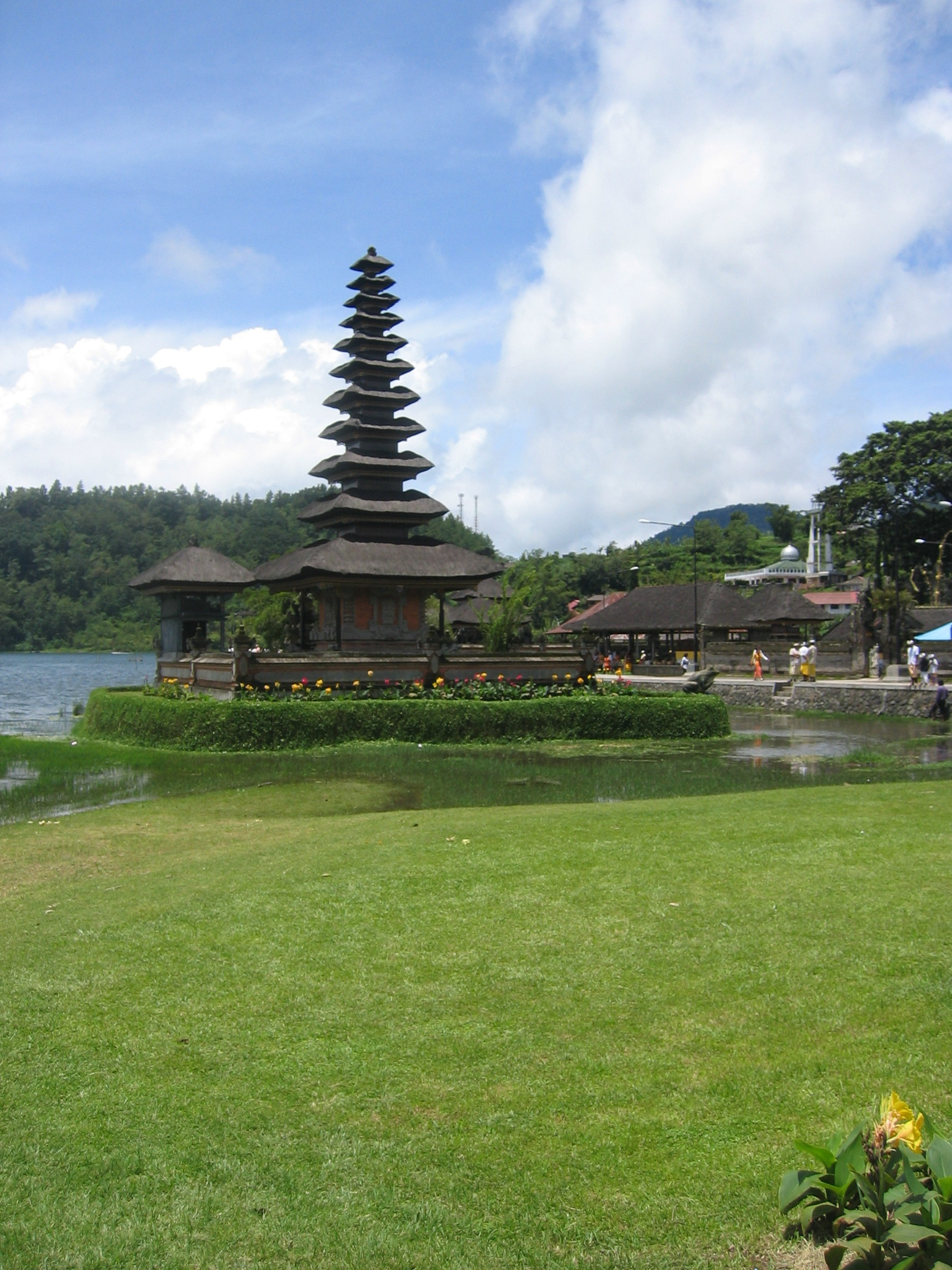
- Pura Ulun

Highest point
- Elevation: 2,276 m (7,467 ft)
- Coordinates: 8.28°S 115.13°E

Dimensions
- Area: 66 km^{2} (25 mi^{2})

Geography
- Location: Bali, Indonesia

Geology
- Rock age: Holocene
- Mountain type: caldera
- Rock type(s): Basalt, Basaltic andesite, Andesite
- Volcanic arc: Sunda Arc
- Last eruption: less than 23 ka

Bratan or Catur or Tjatur is a dormant caldera/stratovolcano located at the northern side of Bali island in Indonesia. The volcanic complex covers an area of 11 by 6 kilometres (6.8 mi × 3.7 mi). The caldera contains 3 separate lakes (Tamblingan, Buyan, and Bratan) and 5 post-caldera volcanoes (Lesung, Tapak, Sengayang, Pohen, and Adeng).

Volcanism at Bratan is the result of subduction as the Indo-Australian plate subducts under the Eurasian plate. Although there have been no eruptions in historic times, geothermal activity in the form of numerous hot springs and fumaroles heated by a magma chamber at depth.

== See also ==
- List of volcanoes in Indonesia
