= Amasing Hill =

Volcanic complex on Bacan island, Indonesia

- Bukit Amasing
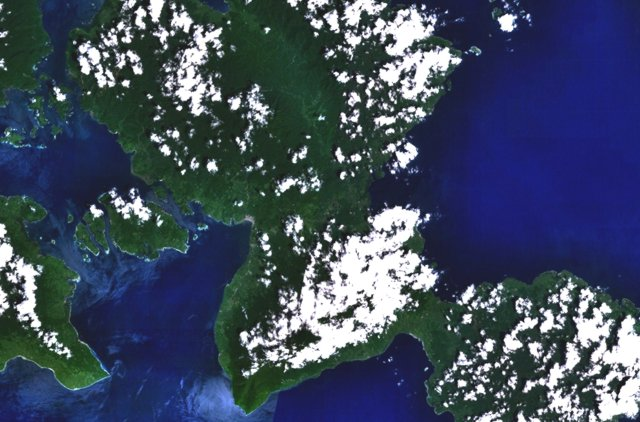
- Satellite photo

Highest point
- Elevation: 1,030 m (3,380 ft)
- Coordinates: 0°32′S 127°29′E

Geography
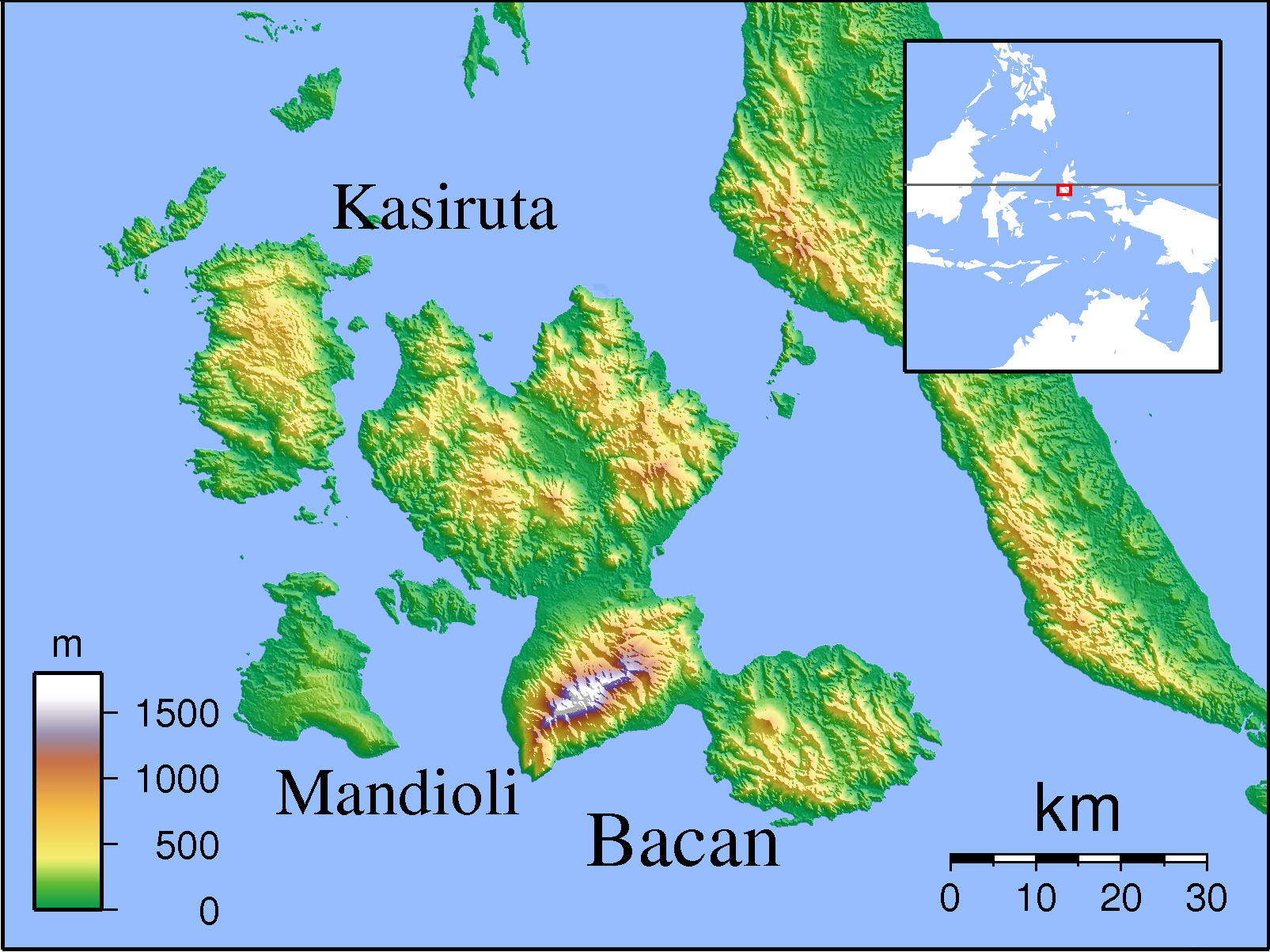
- Location within Bacan Islands
- Location: Bacan, Indonesia

Geology
- Mountain type: Stratovolcanoes
- Last eruption: Unknown

Amasing Hill (Indonesian: Bukit Amasing) consists of three small andesitic stratovolcanoes. The volcanic complex is located on Bacan island at the west of Halmahera island, Indonesia. The two volcanoes, Cakasuanggi and Dua Saudara, were constructed in the southeast. The other volcano, Sibela Mountains, is a metamorphic complex of volcano.

== See also ==
- List of volcanoes in Indonesia
