= Bukit Lumut Balai =

- Location within Sumatra

Highest point
- Elevation: 2,055 m (6,742 ft)
- Coordinates: 4°13′S 103°37′E

Geography
- Location: Sumatra, Indonesia
- Parent range: Bukit Barisan

Geology
- Mountain type: stratovolcano
- Volcanic arc: Sunda Arc
- Last eruption: Unknown

Bukit Lumut Balai is a heavily eroded stratovolcano on Sumatra island, Indonesia. It consist of three eruption centers, two on the Bukit Lumut and one on the north-east side of the Bukit Balai. A large lava flow occurs on the north side of Bukit Balai. Active fumarole fields are found in two crescentic basins to the north of Bukit Lumut.

== See also ==
- List of volcanoes in Indonesia
