= Gunungapi Wetar =

Volcanic island in Indonesia

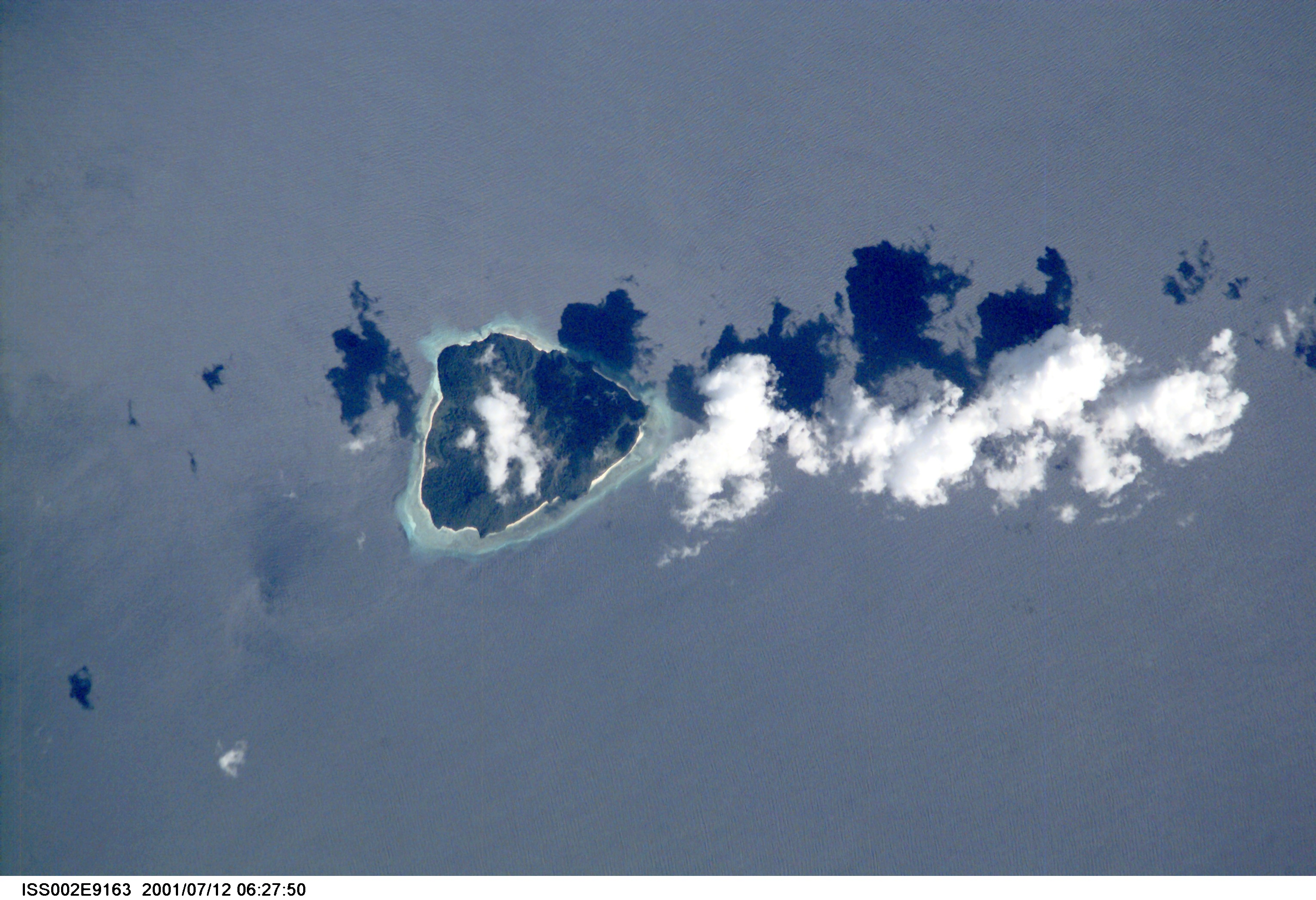

Highest point
- Elevation: 239 m (784 ft)
- Coordinates: 6.642°S 126.65°E

Geography
- Location: Banda Sea, Indonesia

Geology
- Mountain type: Stratovolcano
- Last eruption: 1699

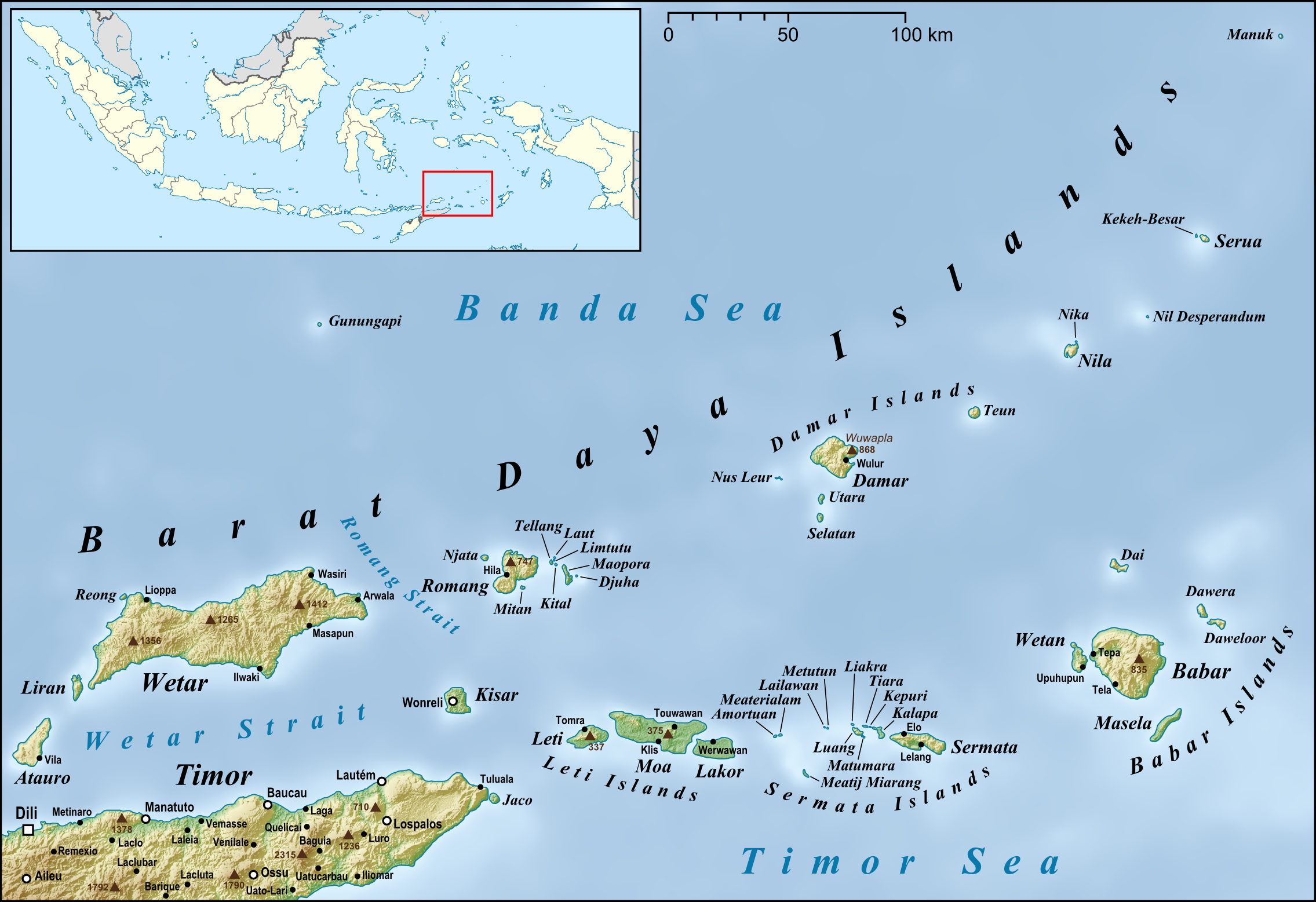
Gunungapi in the north of Wetar

Gunungapi Wetar is an isolated volcanic island to the north of Wetar island in the Banda Sea, Indonesia. The island, a stratovolcano, only extends 239 m above sea level, but the total height of the summit from the sea bed is over 5000 m. Explosions in 1512 and 1699 are the only historical eruptions of the volcano.

== See also ==
- List of volcanoes in Indonesia
