= Mount Iya =

Stratovolcano on Flores island, Indonesia

Iya
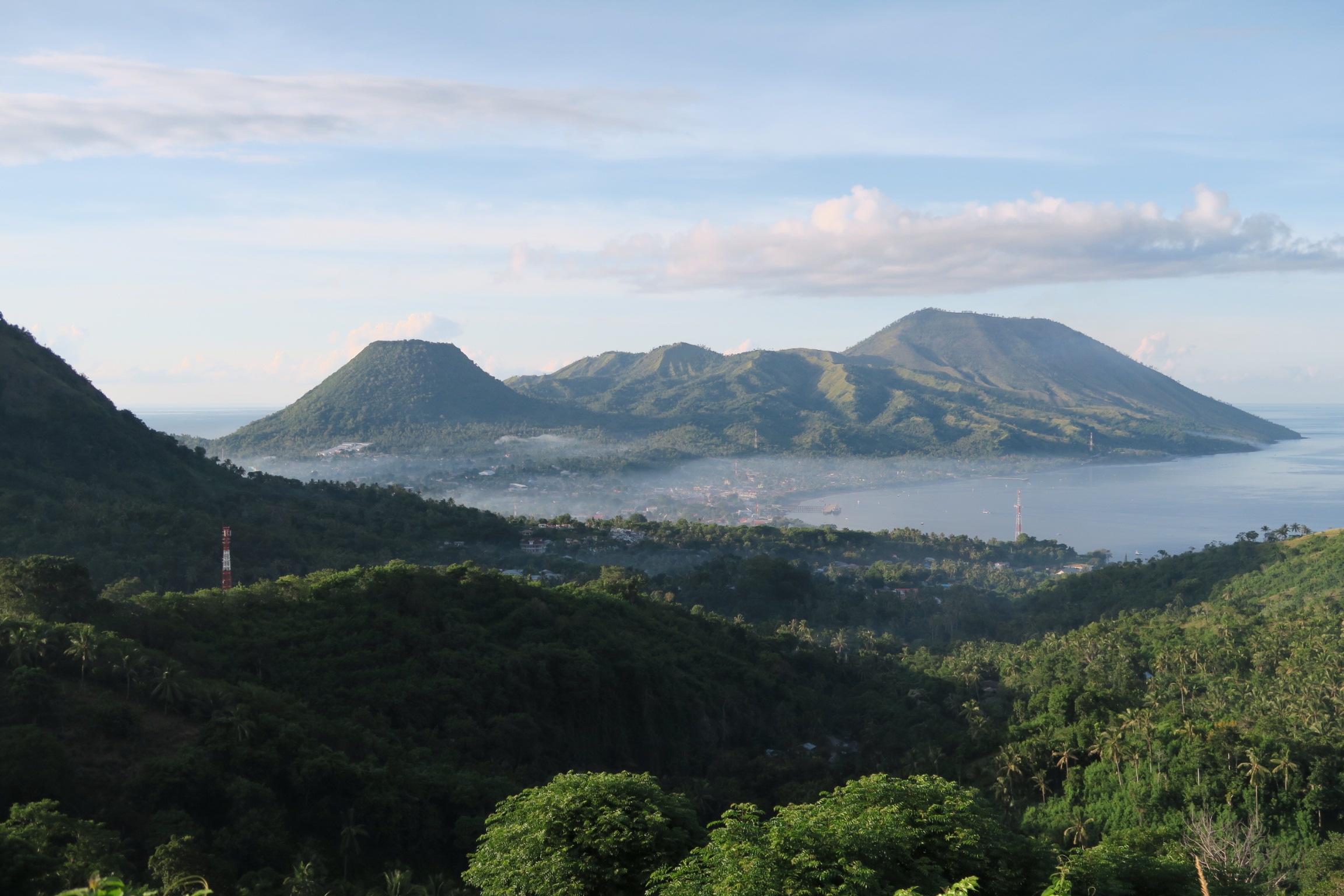
- Seen from the North.

Highest point
- Elevation: 637 m (2,090 ft)
- Coordinates: 8.897°S 121.645°E

Geography
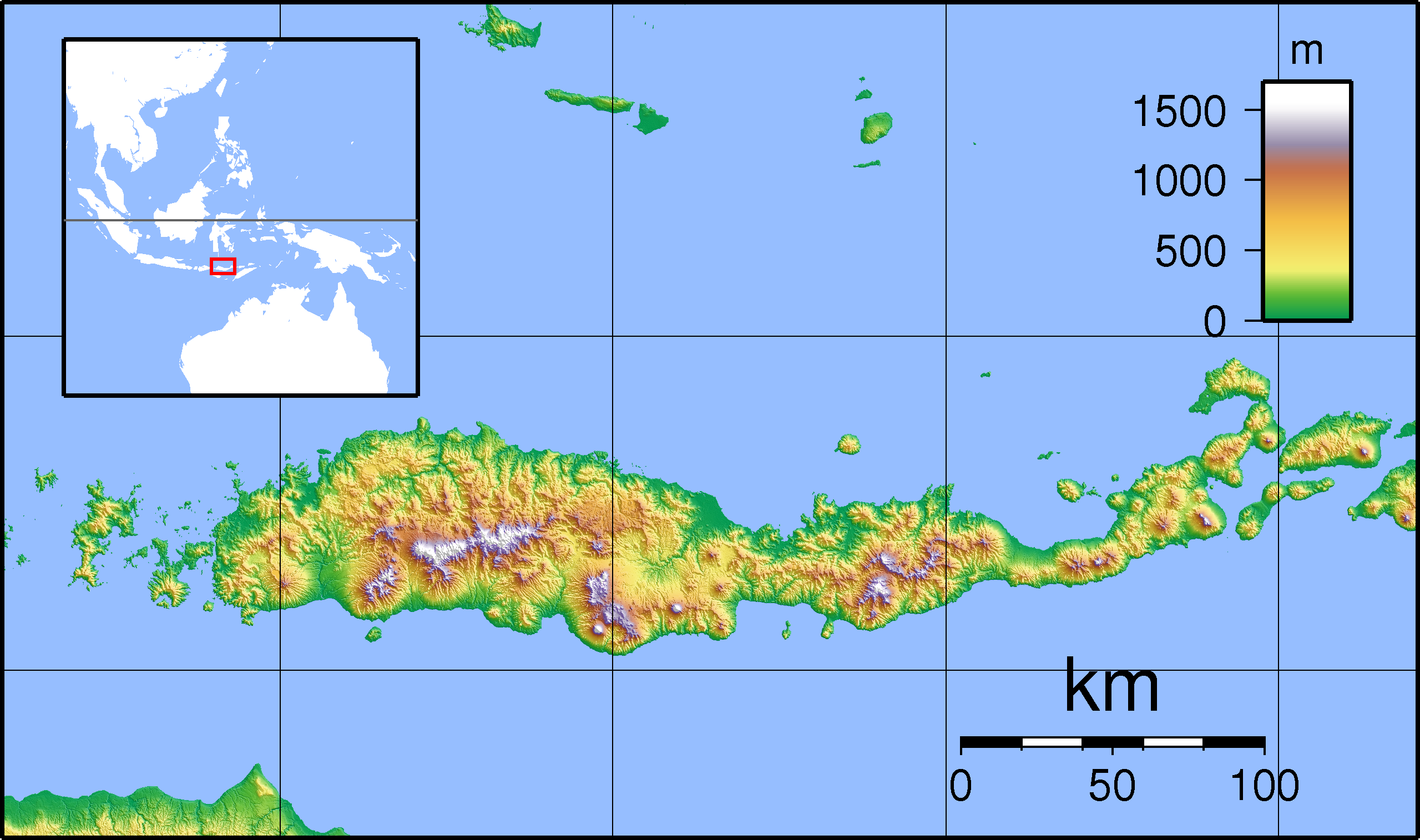
- Location within Flores
- Location: Flores Island, Indonesia

Geology
- Mountain type: Stratovolcano
- Volcanic arc: Sunda Arc
- Last eruption: January 1969

Iya is an active stratovolcano located in the south-central part of the island of Flores, Indonesia, south of the city of Ende.

== See also ==
- List of volcanoes in Indonesia
