= Dukono =

Volcano in North Maluku, Indonesia

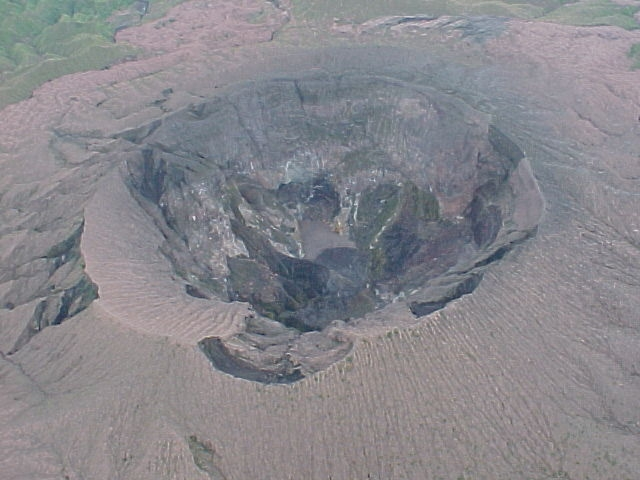
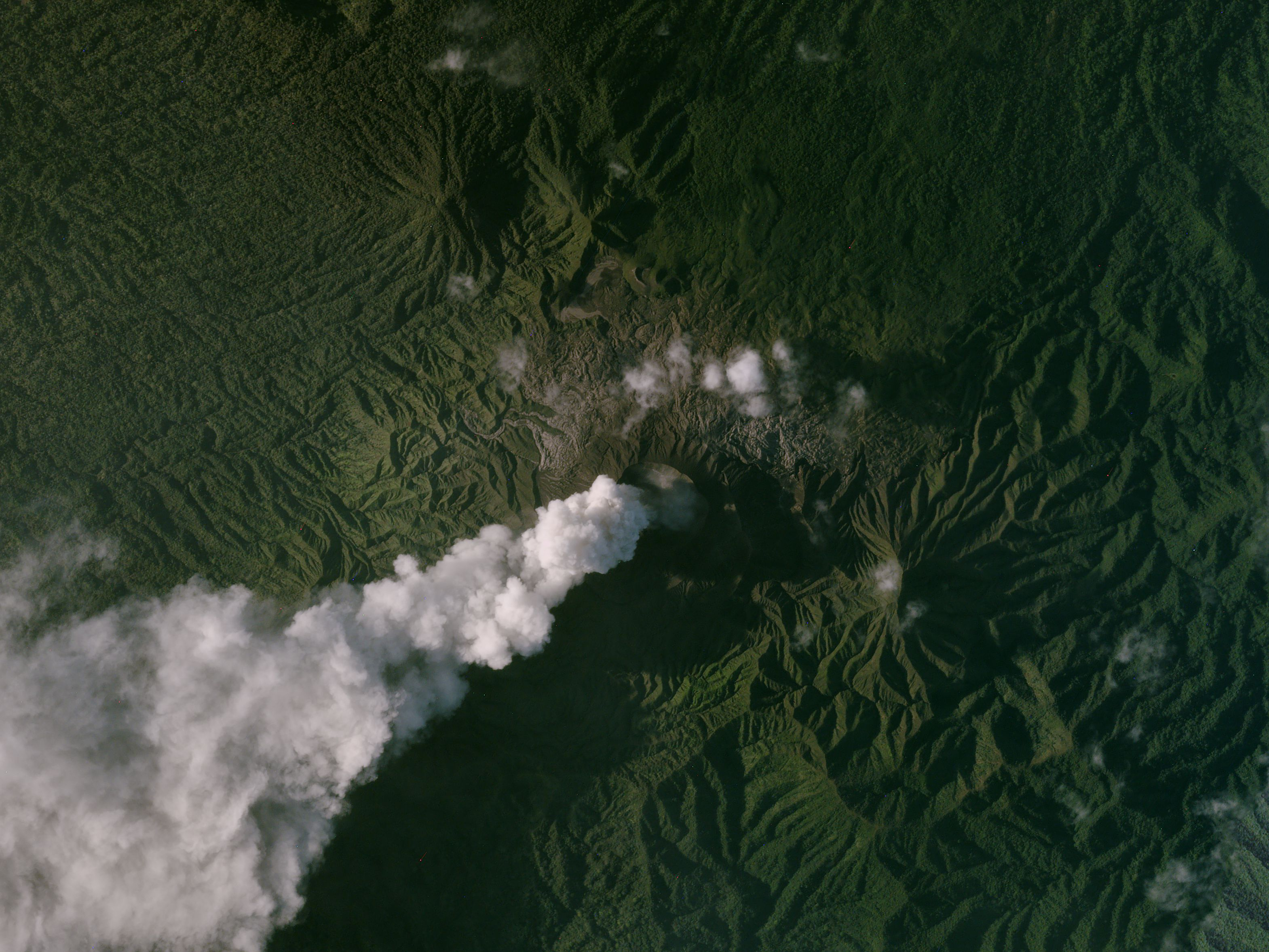
- Top:Aerial view of Dukono in 2007; Bottom: Satellite image of Dukono in 2017

Highest point
- Elevation: 1,273 m (4,177 ft)
- Coordinates: 1°41′57″N 127°52′42″E

Geography
- Location within Indonesia
- Location: Halmahera, Indonesia

Geology
- Mountain type: Complex volcano
- Last eruption: 8 May 2026 (Ongoing)

Dukono is an active volcano located in the northern part of Halmahera island, the largest of the Maluku Islands in Indonesia. It has a broad profile and is capped by compound craters. During the major eruption in 1550, a lava flow filled in the strait between Halmahera and the north flank cone of Mount Mamuya. It was an eruption of scale 3 on VEI. Deaths were reported but the figure is unknown. Smaller eruptions occurred in 1719, 1868, and 1901. Since 1933, Dukono has been erupting continuously until the present.

Eruptions in 2014 increased since early spring. Ash clouds rose up to 2.5 km (1.6 mi) height and volcanic lightning were observed and photographed on 11 June. Strombolian eruptions spew lava bombs on the outer flank of the crater cone.

On 6 April 2026 it erupted when a group was trekking nearby the volcanic mountain. No casualties were reported. The volcano was closed to the public after 17 April; despite this, many visitors ignored warnings around the entrances.

== May 2026 eruption ==
May 2026 eruption of Dukono
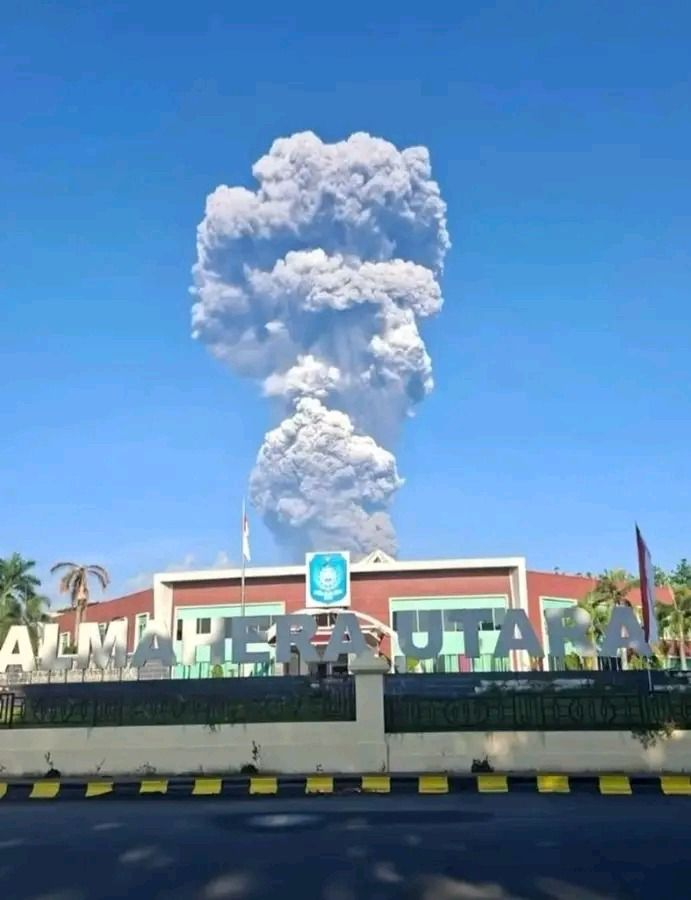
- Volcano: Dukono
- Start date: 8 May 2026
- Start time: 07:14 am local time
- Type: Explosive
- Location: Halmahera, Indonesia
- Impact: 3 dead, 5 injured

Maps
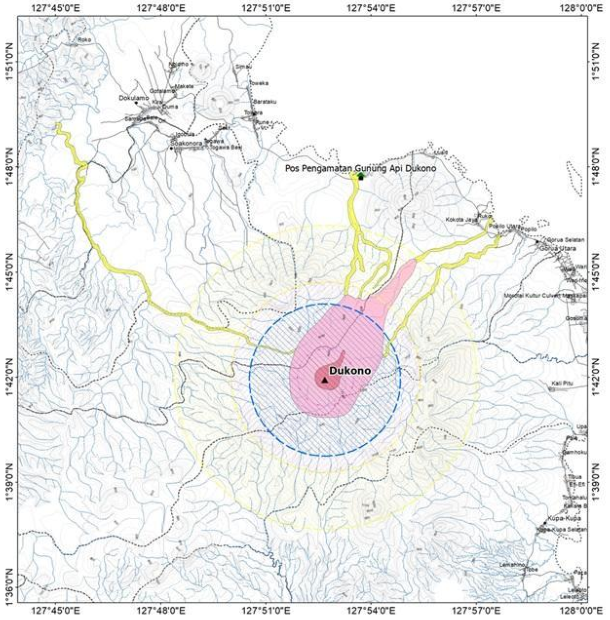

On 8 May 2026 the volcano erupted again, killing three people and injuring five others. The ongoing rumbling from the mountain had slowed down search-and-rescue operations, which was completed on 10 May 2026. Neither the local guide nor the villagers were aware of the climbing ban since April. Some visitors entered with the aim to create social media content.

The eruption sent a column of ash stretching 10 kilometres (6.2 mi) into the sky.

At least 100 rescuers, military and police personnel, as well as two thermal drones, were deployed to the volcano to try and locate the missing hikers. The search was focused around the crater, covering an area of around 700 metres (2,300 ft). The search was halted on Friday evening as the volcano was still erupting. On Saturday, searches were hampered by four morning eruptions. It was completed on 10 May 2026.

Three people were killed and 17 others were rescued of the group of 20 hikers. The deceased were identified as two Singaporeans, aged 30 and 27, and an Indonesian woman from Ternate. At least five sustained injuries of the 17 people rescued. The body of the Indonesian woman was retrieved on 9 May 2026 while the bodies of the two Singaporeans were retrieved on 10 May 2026.

== See also ==
- List of volcanoes in Indonesia
