= Manado River =

Coordinates: 1.49961°N 124.84096°E

Manado River Sungai Tondano, Sungai Manado, Kuala Tondano, Kali Menado, Kali Tondano, Menado River, Manado Rivier, Kali Menodo, Kali Manado, Salo Manado
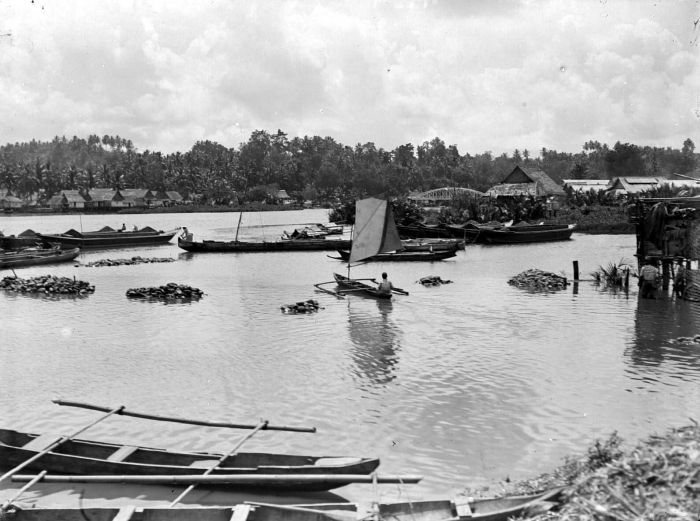
- Manado River

- Location of river mouth Manado River (Indonesia)

Location
- Country: Indonesia
- State: North Sulawesi

Physical characteristics
- Basin size: 538.5 km^{2} (207.9 sq mi)

Basin features
- River system: Tondano basin

The Manado is a river of North Sulawesi on Sulawesi island, Indonesia, about 2200 km northeast of the capital Jakarta. Tributaries include the Sawangan River, Timbukar River and the Ranoyapo River.

The Manado river is the main watercourse in the Tondano River Basin (DAS Tondano), which has a catchment area of approximately 538.45 km² (207.90 sq mi). This basin encompasses the city of Manado, the slopes of Mount Klabat, the Lake Tondano region, and extends to the eastern slopes of Mount Sempu (part of the Soputan mountain range).

== Geography ==
The river flows in the northern area of Sulawesi with predominantly tropical rainforest climate (designated as Af in the Köppen-Geiger climate classification). The annual average temperature in the area is 24 °C. The warmest month is May, when the average temperature is around 25 °C, and the coldest is January, at 22 °C. The average annual rainfall is 2462 mm. The wettest month is January, with an average of 315 mm rainfall, and the driest is September, with 75 mm rainfall.

== See also ==
- Bunaken National Park
- List of drainage basins of Indonesia
- List of volcanoes in Indonesia
- Manado
- Tangkoko Batuangus Nature Reserve
