= Mount Tondano =

Mountain in Indonesia

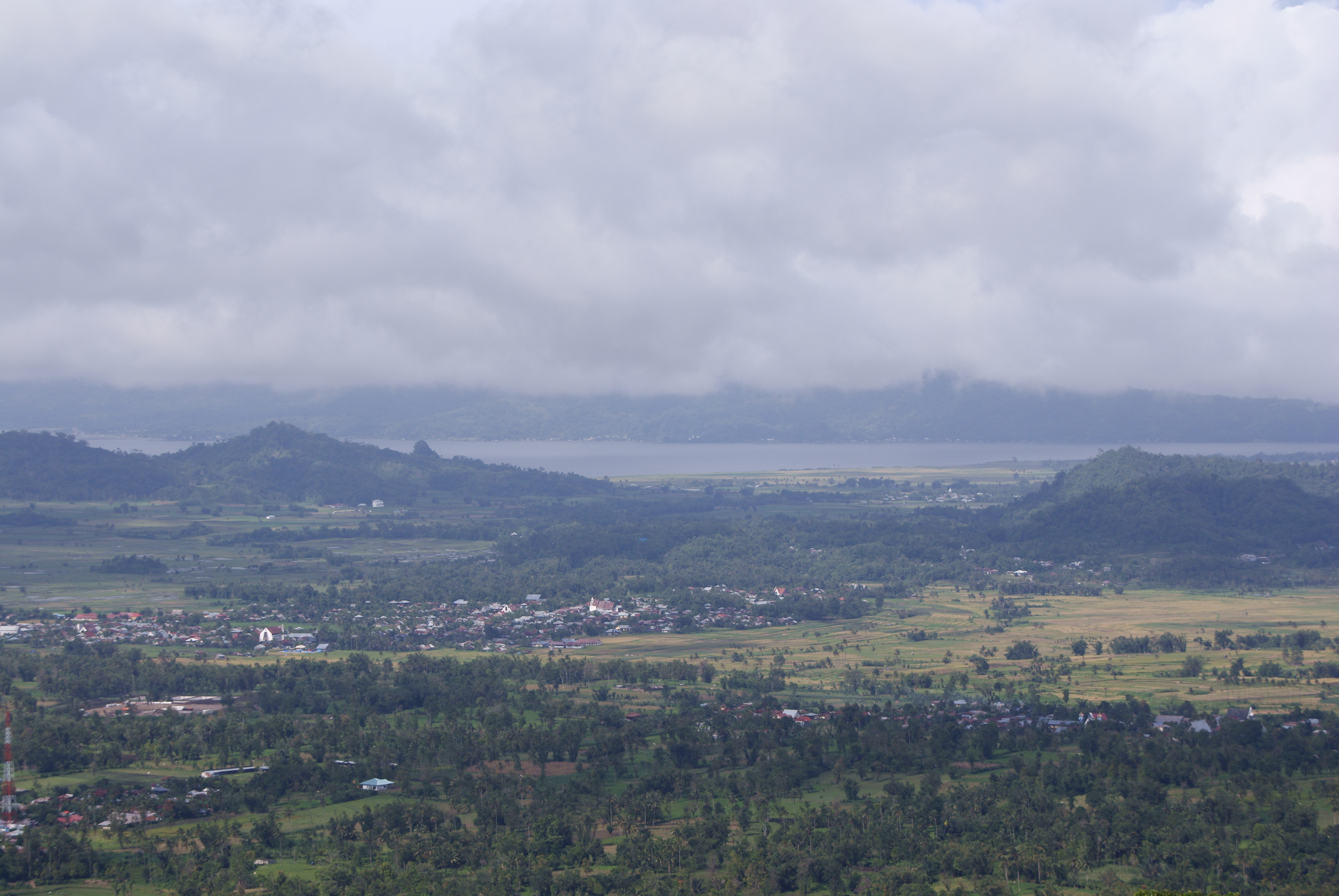

Highest point
- Elevation: 1,202 m (3,944 ft)
- Coordinates: 1°14′N 124°50′E

Geography
- Location within Sulawesi
- Location: Sulawesi, Indonesia

Geology
- Mountain type: Caldera
- Last eruption: Unknown

Mount Tondano in the province of North Sulawesi, Sulawesi, Indonesia, has a 20 × 30 km wide caldera which was formed in the Late Miocene or Early Pliocene by a massive eruption. Post caldera activity includes pyroclastic cones, obsidian flows and geothermal areas in the caldera area. Lake Tondano lies in the east side of the caldera.

The 5 km long and 3.5 km wide ellipsoidal Pangolombian caldera lies entirely within the Tondano Caldera, and formed from a large eruption of an older Somma volcano.

In more recent times, the somma volcanoes of Soputan, Sempu, Lokon-Empung and Mahawu have been constructed along the rim of the Tondano caldera, with Soputan being the youngest and most frequently active of the group. The Tondano caldera has been investigated as a potential source for geothermal energy to support the growing population in the vicinity of the caldera. Energy demand has been growing in Indonesia, and the Tondano caldera system could potentially provide clean energy for thousands of residents in northern Sulawesi.

== See also ==
- List of volcanoes in Indonesia
