= TV 5 Dimensi =

TV5d
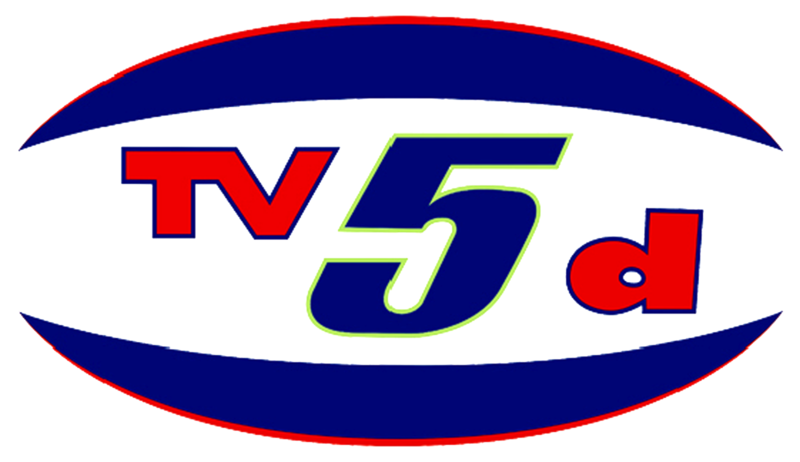
- Tomohon, North Sulawesi; Indonesia

Ownership
- Owner: PT Triguna Persada

History
- First air date: 14 January 2007
- Former channel number: 38 UHF (analog)
- Former affiliations: City TV Network
- Call sign meaning: TV 5 Dimensi

Technical information
- Licensing authority: Kementerian Komunikasi dan Informatika Republik Indonesia

TV5d
- Headquarters: Graha TV5d, Jl. Raya Matani III Tomohon, North Sulawesi

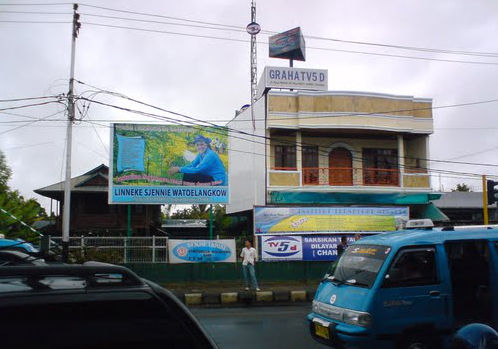
TV 5 Dimensi office

TV5d was a local television station serving Tomohon, North Sulawesi, Indonesia and surrounding areas. The station was founded in 2006 by Netherlands-born entrepreneur, Dr Willie Smits, also chairman of the Masarang Foundation. The station was owned by Linneke Syennie Watoelangkow, also deputy to Tomohon City Mayor, in the period 2005–2010. TV5D celebrated its 2nd anniversary on January 14, 2008. TV5D rates as North Sulawesi's number one television news source. It primarily broadcasts from its headquarters at the Graha TV5 Dimensi in Tomohon, North Sulawesi, Indonesia, with services that are available to more than 4 million people in more than 8 regencies in North Sulawesi and North Maluku.

== History ==
TV 5 Dimensi was launched at 3:00 p.m. WITA on January 14, 2007, after a speech by Indonesian President Susilo Bambang Yudhoyono. Since its debut, TV 5 Dimensi has expanded its duration from 10 hours to 18 hours. Programs such as Sabuah Om Pala, Buka Jendela, Cerita Tentang Sahabat, have become highly popular local programs among North Sulawesi viewers.

== TV Partnership ==
TV 5 Dimensi has been joining partnership, and becoming affiliate station with Jak-TV.

== See also ==
- List of television stations in Indonesia
