= Lake Linow =

Lake in Indonesia

- Danau Linow (Indonesian)
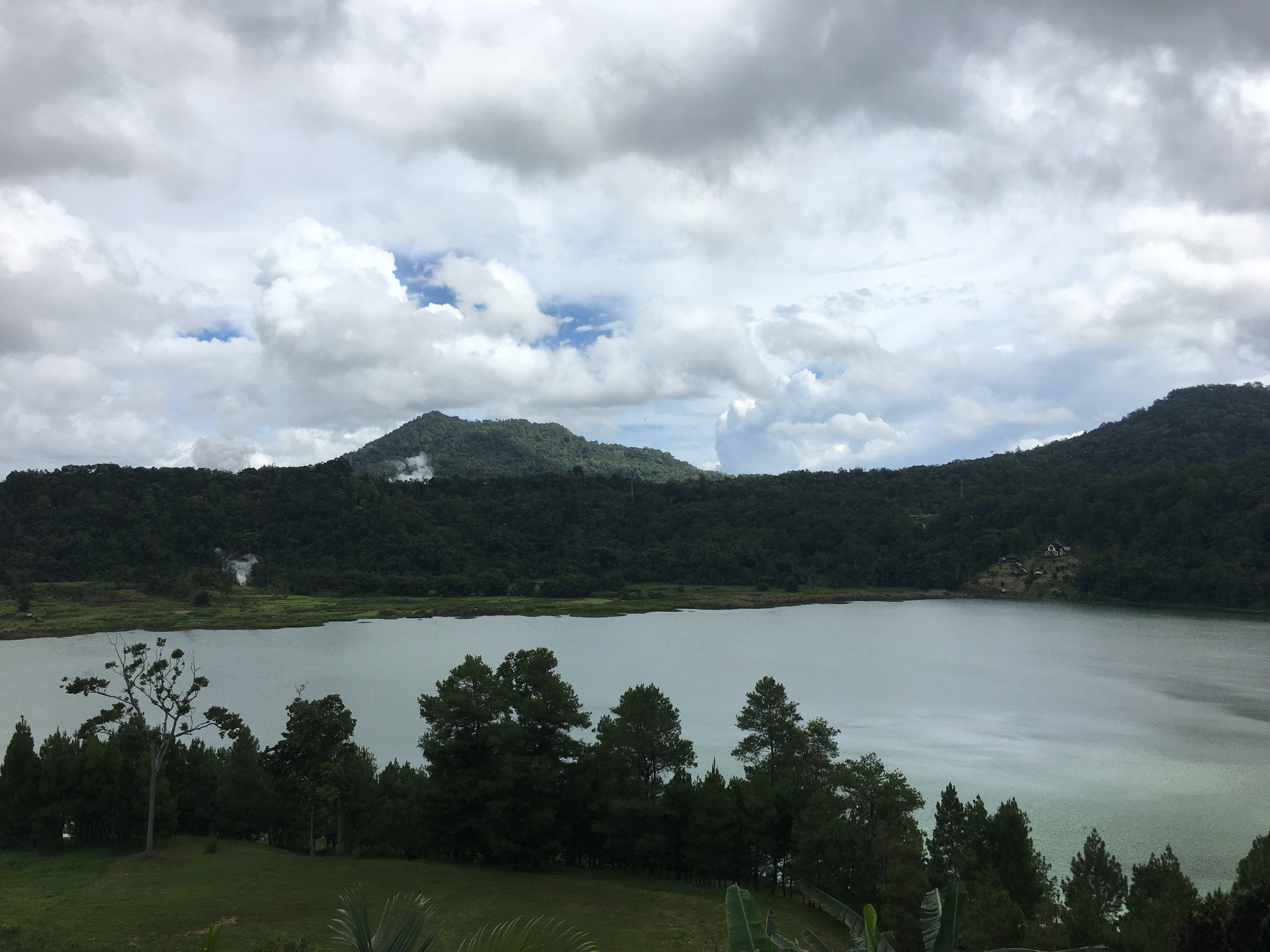

- Location within Sulawesi
- Location: North Sulawesi, Indonesia
- Coordinates: 1.270°N 124.827°E
- Type: Volcanic
- Basin countries: Indonesia
- Surface area: 0.34 km^{2} (0.13 sq mi)
- Islands: Celebes
- Settlements: Tomohon, North Sulawesi

Lake Linow is a volcanic lake located outside Tomohon, near Manado, Indonesia. Several hydrothermal vents spew hot gas from the edges and depths of the lake. The changing chemical composition of the lake means that it changes colors often, ranging from red, dark green, and even to dark blue. The lake is abutted on its sides by Mount Lokon and Mount Mahawu. The lake carries a fairly strong miasma of rotten eggs, due to the sulfur that is often in great quantities in the lake. The word "Linow" derives from the Minahasa word for "water gathering place".

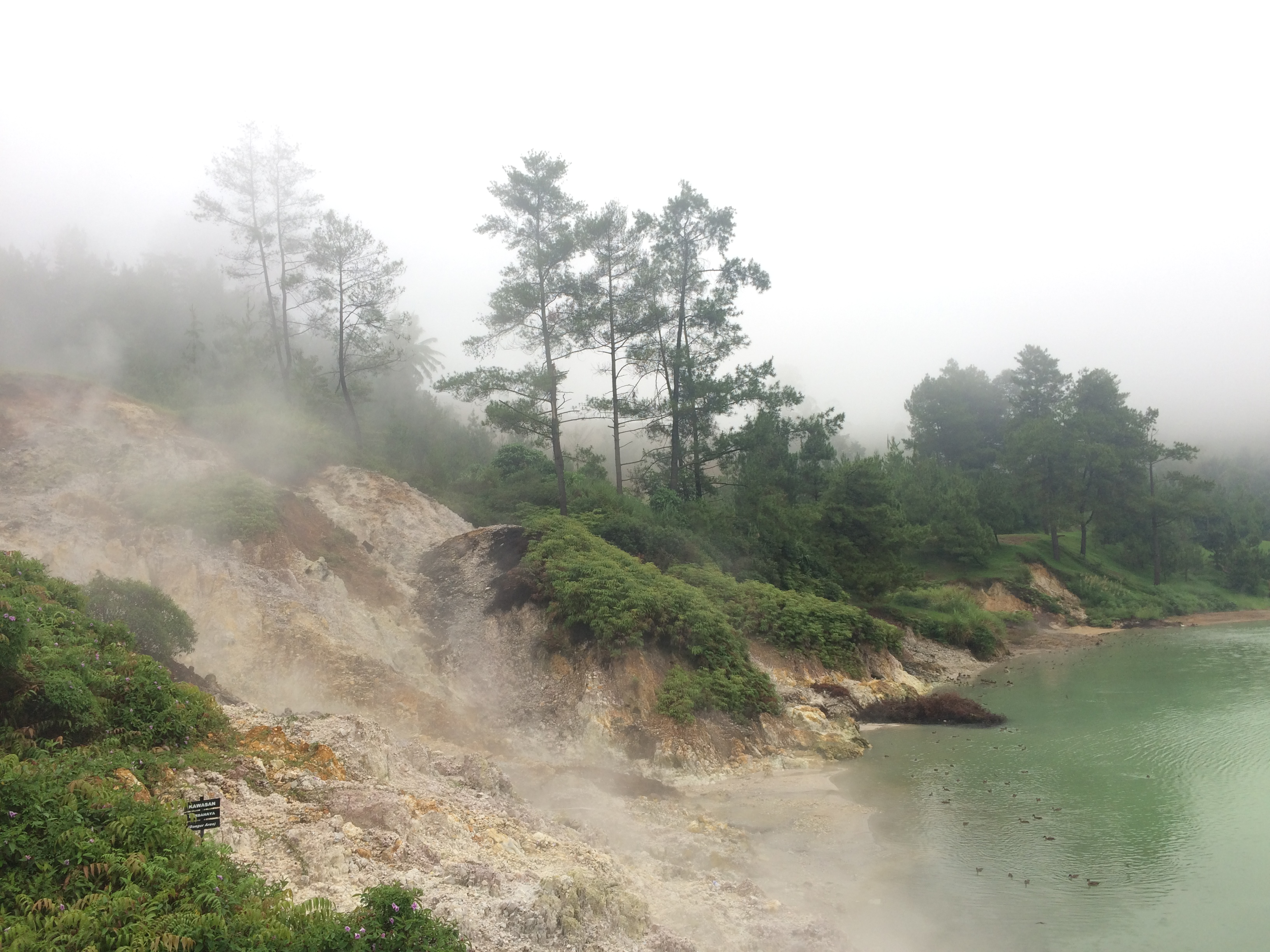
The scenery around the lake

Located 30 km from Manado, Lake Linow can be reached by traveling 3 km west of Tomohon, which takes about an hour. The still-active Mount Lokon is also visible and adds to the beauty of the surrounding panorama. Visitors can take a walk around the lake’s edge, but swimming is not recommended due to the high sulfur content. Exposure to sulfur can cause serious injuries and have fatal consequences.
