= Lokon-Empung =

Active volcano situated in Indonesia

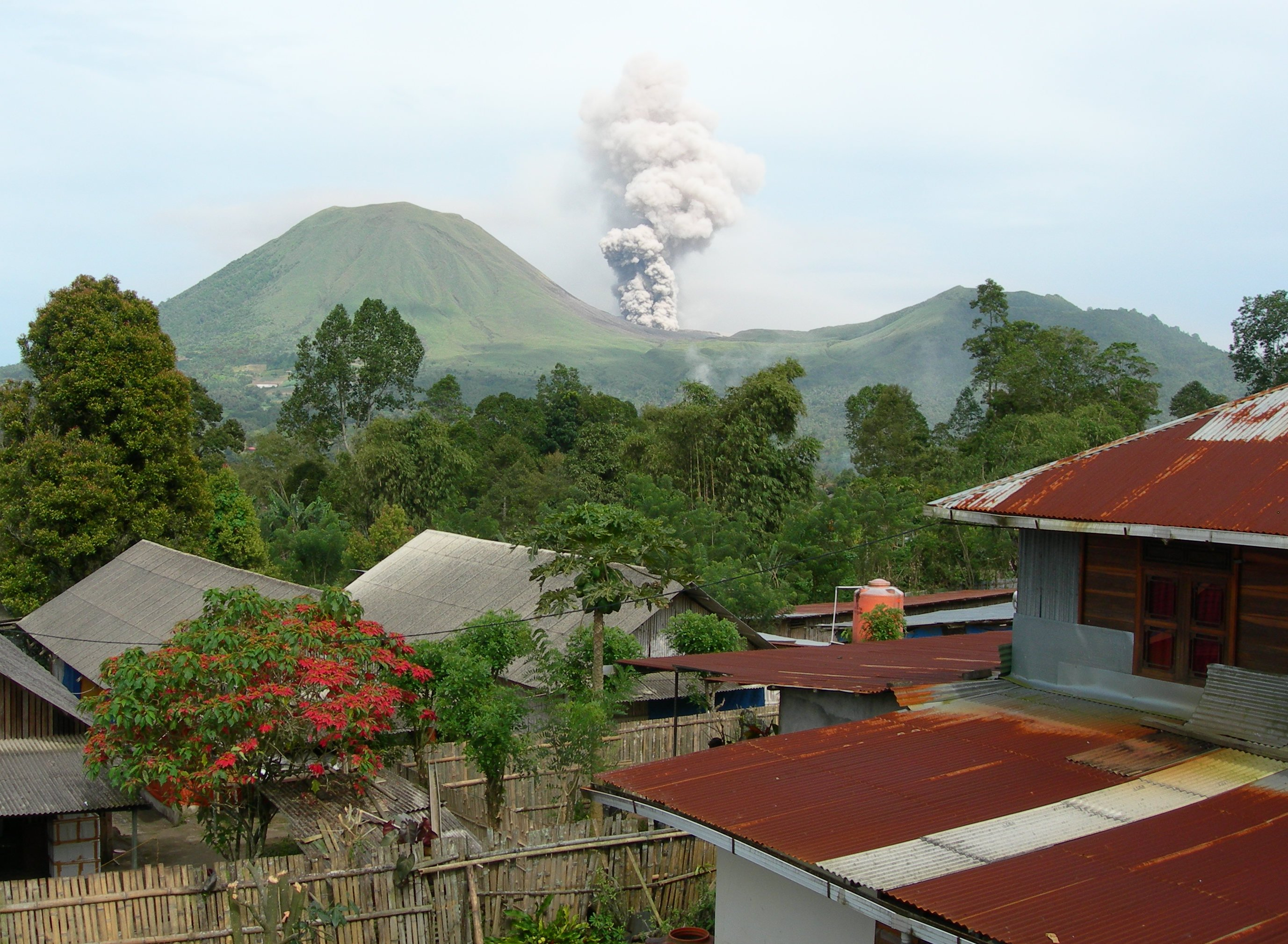
- Explosion in the Tompaluan crater of the dual volcano Lokon-Empung in September 2013.

Highest point
- Elevation: 1,580 m (5,180 ft)
- Coordinates: 1°21′29″N 124°47′28″E

Geography
- Location within Sulawesi
- Location: Indonesia, Sulawesi island

Geology
- Mountain type: Stratovolcano
- Last eruption: May 2015

Lokon-Empung is an active stratovolcano on the island of Sulawesi. It is one of the most active in Indonesia. It consists of two volcanic cones, the older Lokon and the younger Empung. The active crater of Tompaluan is situated in the saddle between the two cones.

== Features ==
Lokon cone, the older and higher (reaching a height of 1,580 M) of the two cones, has a flat and craterless top. Lokon formed during a period of andesitic volcanism on ring fractures resulting from the Tondano caldera's Late Miocene or Early Pliocene collapse. Empung is the younger of the two cones. The cone has a 400 M wide crater that is 150 M deep. The cone of Empung has erupted twice in historical times (two moderate eruptions in the 14th and 18th centuries), but all subsequent eruptions have originated from the Tompuluan crater. Tompaluan is a 150 x 250 m wide double crater situated in the saddle between the two peaks, historical eruptions have been reported from the crater since the mid-19th century.

== Eruptive history ==
Historical eruptions have been reported since 1375 (give or take 25 years). The first two eruptions came from the Empung cone, both the eruptions were VEI 3's. Eruptions since 1829 have been from the Tompaluan Crater. Most eruptions from the crater have been mild Phreatic eruptions, but Lava domes and lava flows have also been erupted. In the 20th century, notable eruptions occurred in 1950-1951, 1958-1959, 1971, 1986, 1991-1992, 2001-2003, 2011, 2012, 2013, and the most recent 2015.

== 1991-1992 eruption ==
On 24 October 1991 at about 09:31 WITA, a new eruptive phase began at Lokon’s Tompaluan crater, producing ash plumes up to 2 km in height. This prompted the evacuation of roughly 10,000 people from nearby villages.

A major explosion on 25 October produced an estimated 0.015 km³ of tephra and a 1.5 km-long pyroclastic flow to the east, making this the largest event of the eruption.

On October 27, Swiss physician Viviane Clavel was killed near the crater by falling blocks and ash.

Explosions continued intermittently through November and December 1991; sixteen were recorded after the initial eruption producing ash columns up to 2.5 km high.

Activity began to decline late in the year, and by January 1992 the eruption had ended. The 1991–1992 eruption is classified as VEI 3, with total tephra volume being (≈0.015 km³). This was the largest eruption at Lokon-Empung in the 20th century.

== 2001-2003 eruption ==
A new eruption began on January 27, 2001. An explosion on 28 January prompted an alert increase from 2 to 3. After a brief lull, a larger blast on 26 March sent a dark ash plume 1.5 km above the crater and produced ashfall in nearby villages. Activity resumed in 2002 with occasional explosions, including a 10 April event that lofted ash to about 1 km. Eruptions intensified in early 2003. On 23 February an eruption caused an ash cloud to rise 2.5 km above the crater. This was followed by a 2 March explosion that sent ash 1.5 km high and deposited roughly 1 mm of ash up to 14.5 km away at Lake Tondano. On 27 March another night eruption ejected ash to 1.5 km and incandescent material to roughly 400 m above the crater. The alert was lowered later that month as seismicity declined.

== Current Unrest ==
On April 15, 2020, volcanic unrest increased due to an increase in earthquakes over a few days span. This prompted the Pusat Vulkanologi dan Mitigasi Bencana Geologi (PVMBG) to increase the volcanic alert from 1 (background levels of activity) to 2 (unrest is slightly elevated).

On June 13, 2023, PVMBG reported elevated gas and steam emissions from the Tompaluan crater. Seismic data recorded 12 earthquakes in total. White steam-and-gas emissions of variable densities rose as high as 500 m and drifted N, W, and S during 14–20 June. A month later, on July 19, 2023, the alert level was raised to level 3, meaning: "The volcano may be erupting, and there is an obvious change in activity. The public should avoid the area surrounding the volcano and, if in close proximity, begin preparing for evacuation." By the middle of September, volcanic unrest decreased significantly. This prompted the PVMBG to lower the alert level to 2.

Volcanic unrest increased again in November 2024. During 6–12 November, daily gas-and-steam emissions rose 10–20 m above the summit and drifted multiple directions. Between 32 and 154 shallow volcanic earthquakes were recorded each day. This prompted another increase to level 3.

As of October 1, 2025, the alert level remains at 3 as volcanic unrest at a high level remains present.
