= Mount Sempu =

Volcano in Sulawesi, Indonesia

- Location within Sulawesi

Highest point
- Elevation: 1,549 m (5,082 ft)
- Listing: Ribu
- Coordinates: 1°07′48″N 124°45′29″E

Geography
- Location: Sulawesi, Indonesia

Geology
- Mountain type: Caldera
- Last eruption: Unknown

Mount Sempu is a volcano in the northern arm of Sulawesi, Indonesia, which contains a 3 km wide caldera. A maar, called Kawah Masem, was formed in the south-west of the caldera and contains a crater lake. Sulfur deposits have been extracted from the maar since 1938. Historical records, however, are unknown from the volcano.

== See also ==
- Bunaken National Park
- Lake Tondano
- List of volcanoes in Indonesia
- Manado river
- Mount Klabat
- Mount Soputan
- Tangkoko Batuangus Nature Reserve
