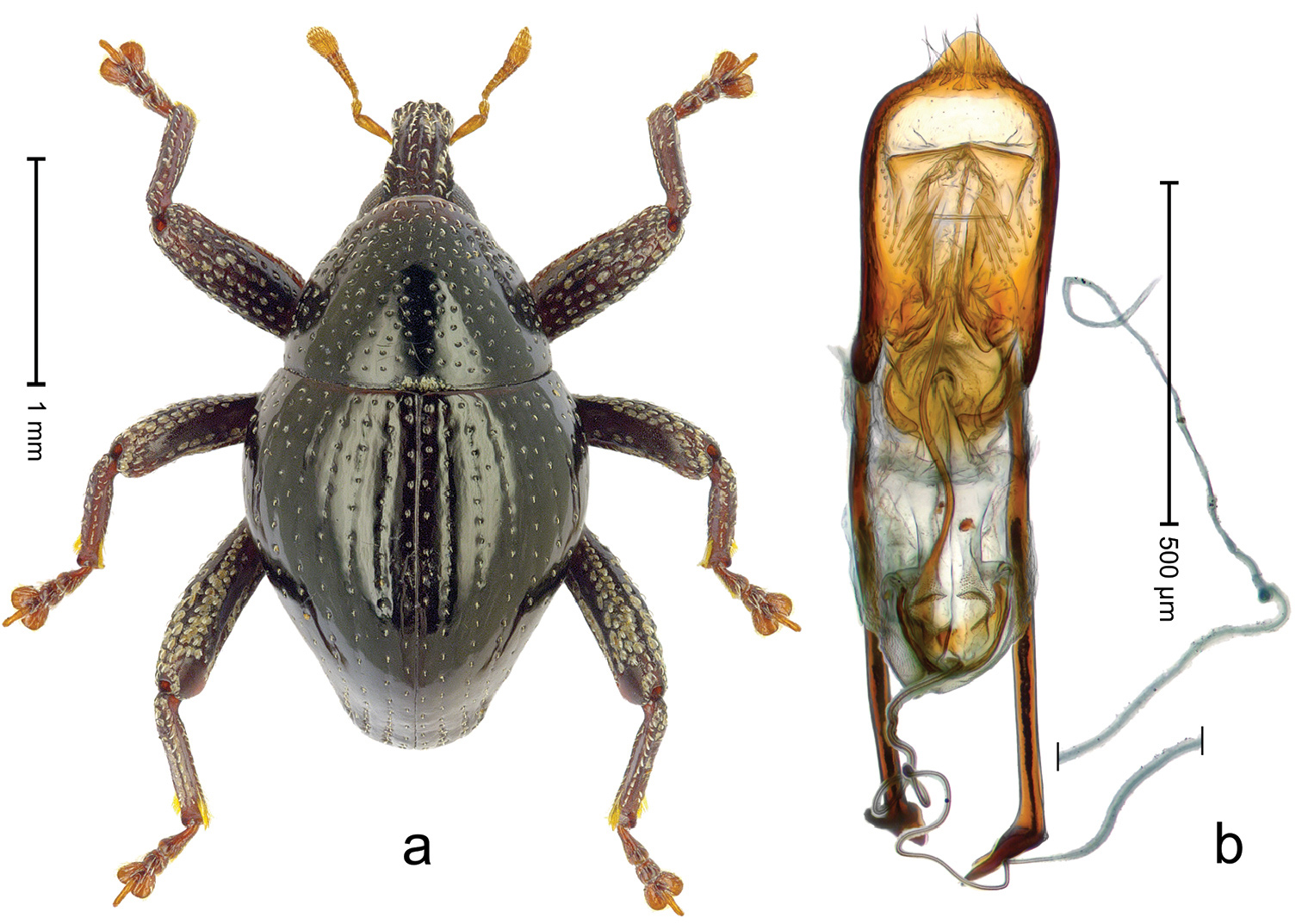
- Holotype specimen and penis

Scientific classification
- Kingdom: Animalia
- Phylum: Arthropoda
- Clade: Pancrustacea
- Class: Insecta
- Order: Coleoptera
- Suborder: Polyphaga
- Infraorder: Cucujiformia
- Family: Curculionidae
- Genus: Trigonopterus
- Species: T. nitidulus

Binomial name
- Trigonopterus nitidulus Riedel A, Narakusum, March 2019

= Trigonopterus nitidulus =

Species of beetle

Trigonopterus nitidulus is a species of flightless weevil in the genus Trigonopterus from Indonesia. The species was described in May 2019 and is named after its small size and its elytral sculpture. The beetle is 2.33–2.58 mm long. Its antennae, tibiae, and tarsi are reddish-brown, while the rest of the body is black. Endemic to North Sulawesi, where it has been recorded from Mount Dua Saudara and Mount Klabat. Found in leaf litter and on vegetation in montane forests at elevations of 700–760 m.

== Taxonomy ==
Trigonopterus nitidulus was described by the entomologist Alexander Riedel in 2019 on the basis of an adult male specimen collected from Mount Klabat in North Sulawesi, Indonesia. The specific epithet is derived from the Latin adjective nitidus, meaning 'polished', and refers to the beetle's small size and its elytral sculpture.

== Description ==
The beetle is 2.33–2.58 mm long. It has ferruginous antennae, tibiae, and tarsi, while the rest of the body is black. Its body is somewhat oval and appears convex when viewed from the side. The rostrum features a central ridge and two submedian ridges. Just behind the epistome, the surface is scabrous and bears sparse rows of upright, subclavate scales. The epistome itself has a transverse, angled ridge at the back.

The pronotum is densely punctured across its surface. On the top, the punctures are small with nearly smooth spaces between them, while on the sides, the punctures are larger and coarser. The elytra have striae marked by small punctures and faint lines, which become more deeply indented near the tip. Stria 8, along the humerus, contains large, coarse punctures. The spaces between the grooves are mostly smooth, and the lower edge near the tip has a crenate appearance.

The femora are edentate and have a coarsely punctured front surface, with each puncture bearing a flat scale. The hind femur has a toothed upper rear edge and a stridulatory patch near the tip. The back surface of the hind tibia has small teeth near the base and is mostly smooth with a few scattered hairs, possibly worn down. The first two abdominal segments are slightly sunken and mostly smooth. The fifth segment is flat, finely textured, and has a dull appearance.

In males, the penis has nearly parallel sides that taper to a somewhat triangular tip. Near the tip, the setae are sparse, and the top surface has setae pointing toward the midline. The apodemes are 1.4 times the length of the penis body. The transfer apparatus is flagelliform and about 1.2 times longer than the penis. The ductus ejaculatorius has a faintly defined bulb at its base.

== Distribution ==
Endemic to North Sulawesi, where it has been recorded from Mount Dua Saudara and Mount Klabat. Found in leaf litter and on vegetation in montane forests at elevations of 700–760 m.
