= Tangkoko Batuangus Nature Reserve =

Protected area in Sulawesi, Indonesia

- Tangkoko-Batuangus Dua Saudara
- IUCN category Ia (strict nature reserve)
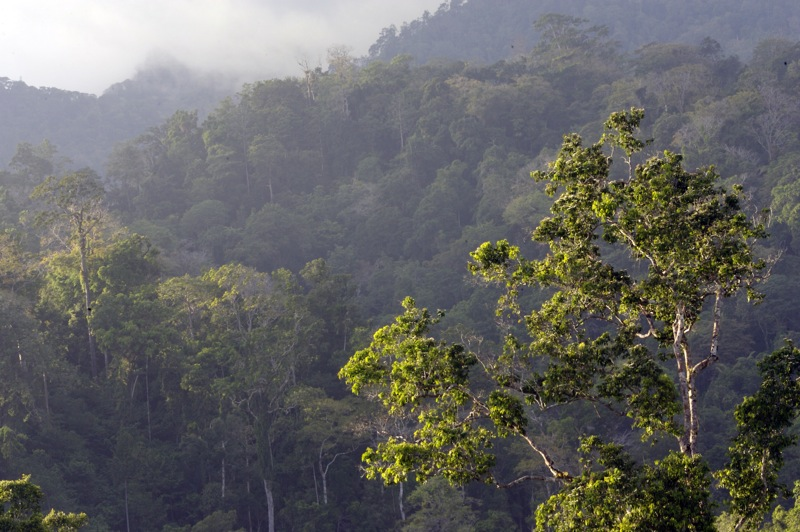
- Tangkoko Nature Reserve in 2006

- Location within Sulawesi
- Location: North Sulawesi, Indonesia
- Nearest city: Bitung
- Coordinates: 1°31′N 125°11′E
- Area: 87.18 square kilometres (33.66 sq mi)
- Established: 24 December 1981; 44 years ago
- Visitors: 7,500 (in 2007)
- Governing body: Ministry of Environment and Forestry

Tangkoko Batuangus Nature Reserve, Indonesian: Tangkoko-Batuangus Dua Saudara is a nature reserve in the northern part of Sulawesi island of Indonesia, 70 kilometres (43 miles) from Manado City. The reserve covers an area of 8,718 hectares (21,540 acres), and includes three mountains: Mount Tangkoko at 1,109 metres (3,638 feet), Mount Dua Saudara at 1,361 metres (4,465 feet), and Mount Batuangus at 450 metres (1,480 feet).

== Flora and fauna ==
The most common trees in the lowland rainforest of the park are species of the Palaquium genus, Cananga odorata and Dracontomelon dao.

Tangkoko Batuangus Nature Reserve protects at least 127 mammal, 233 bird, and 104 reptile and amphibian species. Of these, 79 mammal, 103 bird, and 29 reptile and amphibian species are endemic to the island.

Threatened mammals include the Celebes crested macaque, of which about 5,500 remain on the island, spectral tarsier, Sulawesi bear cuscus and Sulawesi dwarf cuscus. Birds include the green-backed kingfisher, lilac kingfisher, Sulawesi dwarf kingfisher, knobbed hornbill, Sulawesi hornbill and maleo, some of which are endemic to the area. Tangkoko Nature Reserve has been a popular destination in North Sulawesi for wildlife watching tourism.

== Conservation and threats ==
The first conservation area at Mount Tongkoko was established in 1919; 107 years ago. To this the Duasaudara area was added in 1978, and the Batuangus and Batuputih areas in 1981, together encompassing a total of 8,718 hectares (21,540 acres). Visitation is only allowed in the Batuputih area.

Several Indonesian and international environmental organisations are involved with conservation efforts in the reserve, including Sulut Bosami, Wildlife Conservation Society, and Tarantula.

Habitat destruction and hunting pose serious threats to the reserve. As result of hunting, between 1978 and 1993, the number of crested macaques declined by 75%, maleo birds by 90%, and bear cuscus by 95%. A survey of the three surrounding villages conducted in 2005 found that while the most frequently hunted species were rats, locals still hunted for macaques and cuscus both for meat and to be sold on the market.

== See also ==
- Bunaken National Park
- CITES
- Lake Tondano
- List of drainage basins of Indonesia
- List of volcanoes in Indonesia
- Mount Klabat
- Mount Sempu
- Mount Soputan
- Protected areas of Indonesia
