= Willie Smits =

Dutch environmentalist

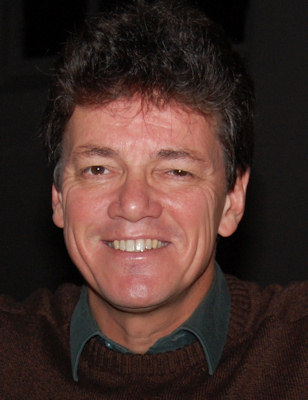
Willie Smits

Willie Smits (born February 22, 1957, in Weurt, Gelderland, the Netherlands) is a trained forester, microbiologist, conservationist, animal welfare activist, wilderness engineer and social entrepreneur. He has lived in Indonesia since 1985 and is an Indonesian citizen. He is married to Adrienne C. Watson since March 2016.

Smits founded the Borneo Orangutan Survival Foundation and has worked for the survival of this threatened species of ape, during which time his work has also broadened out into the related areas of sustainable farming, reforestation and remote monitoring of forests. He travels widely, raising awareness of the issues surrounding deforestation in Borneo and the plight of the orangutan. He became a senior advisor to the Ministry of Forests in Indonesia and has been knighted in the Netherlands.

== Early life ==
Willie Smits was born in a small village in the Netherlands to a farm worker father and a dressmaker mother. His childhood was marked by hardship and poverty; he and his siblings often went hungry, and the family lived in a cramped two-by-two-meter space shared among five people. Smits also faced developmental challenges during his early years, including a struggle with autism until the age of five. Despite the difficulties of his upbringing, Smits developed a deep connection with animals from an early age. Growing up on a farm, he found comfort in their companionship and began observing wildlife as a child. By the age of six, he had taken up birdwatching, and at twelve he wrote his first article on barn owl behavior. He later established a small rescue center for injured owls and falcons, reflecting his early dedication to animal welfare.

== Training ==
In 1994, Willie Smits received his MSc degree in tropical forestry, tropical soil science and genetics at the Wageningen University in the Netherlands, and a PhD degree in tropical forestry from the same university based upon his research in Samboja and Balikpapan, East Kalimantan, Indonesia on the symbiosis between mycorrhizas and the roots of Dipterocarpaceae tropical rainforest trees.

== Wanariset Research Station ==
From 1985 Smits worked on the Wanariset Tropical Forest Research Station in Samboja near Balikpapan in the Indonesian province of East Kalimantan. In the early 1990s he was team leader of the Tropenbos Kalimantan Project Indonesia, an international partnership between the Indonesian Ministry of Forestry and Tropenbos Foundation.

== Borneo Orangutan Survival Foundation ==
In 1991 Smits founded what was soon to become the Borneo Orangutan Survival Foundation (BOS), in Kalimantan (Indonesian Borneo), the world's largest organization for the protection of the endangered Bornean orangutans. Two years before, Smits had had his first encounter with an orangutan in the market. It was a life-changing event and Smits often retells the story:

"Somebody stuck a crate in my face at the market in Balikpapan. Looking out between the slats were the very, very sad eyes of a baby orangutan. I couldn’t forget them. That evening I went back after the market closed. Walking around in the dark, I heard a horrible gasping sound. The baby in its crate was on the garbage dump, dying. I picked her up."

He nursed her back to health and named her Uce (pronounced "Ootcha") for the laboured sound she made while gasping for breath. A few weeks later he was given another sick orangutan to look after, which he named Dodoy.

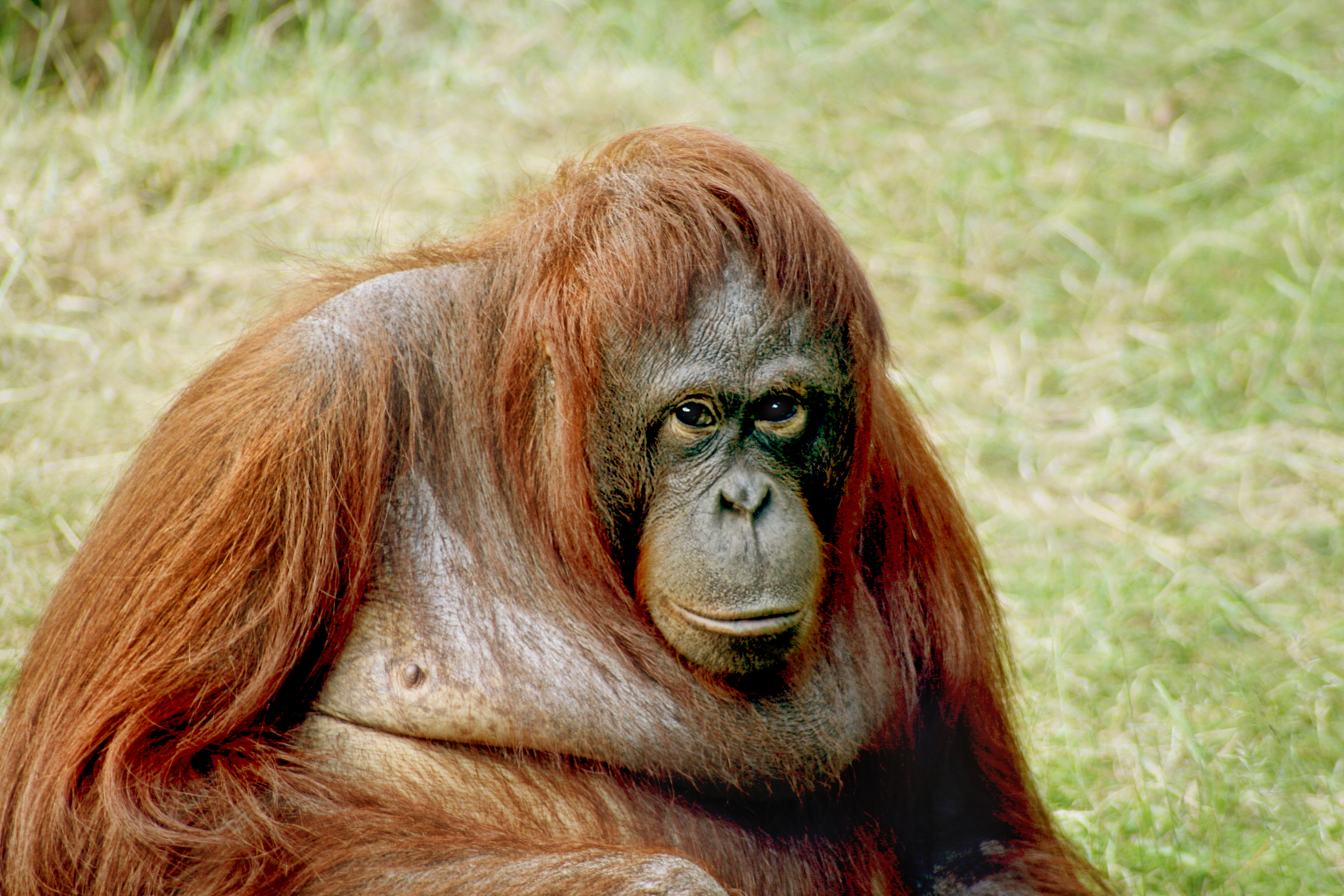
The Bornean orangutan

With the help of thousands of schoolchildren in Balikpapan contributing small amounts of money, Smits was able to set up what became the Borneo Orangutan Survival Foundation to rehabilitate orphaned and misused orangutans and return them to a safe place in the wild. Wanariset became home to hundreds of confiscated orangutans, rescued from illegal animal smuggling, kept as pets or exploited in other ways.

The Dutch orangutan-scientist Herman Rijksen recalls Smits creating the facility: "In no time he set up the most fantastic oversized quarantine facility, better than any hospital in the whole area, because that's typical of Willie. He wants to do it very, very good."

Smits believes that protecting orangutans in their habitat benefits not only orangutans but also the environment, biological diversity, and people in Borneo and throughout the world. The activities of the Borneo Orangutan Survival Foundation expanded from rescuing, rehabilitating and releasing orangutans to monitoring, conserving and rebuilding rainforest, along with the social engagement that made this sustainable. Smits also took on an increasing campaigning and advocacy role, to make the plight of the orangutan and its habitat more widely known.

== Samboja Lestari ==
In 2001, BOS started purchasing land near Wanariset Samboja(1°2′44″S 116°59′15″E). The 2,000 hectares (4,900 acres) area it acquired had been deforested by mechanical logging, drought and severe fires and was covered in alang-alang grass (Imperata cylindrica). The aim was to restore the rainforest and provide a safe haven for rehabilitated orangutans while at the same time providing a source of income for local people. The name Samboja Lestari roughly translates as the "everlasting conservation of Samboja". Wilderness engineering in the form of reforestation and rehabilitation is the core of the project, with hundreds of indigenous species planted. By the middle of 2006 more than 740 different tree species had been planted.

The Orangutan Reintroduction Project at Wanariset Research Station was moved to Samboja Lestari. "Forest Schools" were established, areas that provide natural, educational playgrounds for the orangutans in which to learn forest skills. Here the orangutans roam freely but under supervision and are returned to sleeping cages for the night. "Orangutan islands" were created where the orangutans and other wildlife that cannot return to the wild are nevertheless able to live in almost completely natural conditions.

At his 2009 TED talk Smits stated there had been a substantial increase in cloud cover and 30% more rainfall due to the reforestation at Samboja Lestari, the rainfall increase data being consistent with the absence of trade winds. When challenged, Smits cited the production of cloud condensation nuclei by rainforest as a possible mechanism to account for the observed data.

To finance the nature reserve, BOS created a system of "land-purchasing", a "Create Rainforest" initiative where people symbolically adopt square metres of rainforest. Donors are able to view and follow the progress of the purchase with their donation in the project area with Google Earth satellite images from 2002 and 2007 with additional information overlaid.

== Masarang Foundation ==
Smits is one of the founders of, and the chairman of the Masarang Foundation, which raises money and awareness to restore habitat forests around the world and to empower local people. In 2007, Masarang opened a palm sugar factory that uses thermal energy to turn the juice tapped daily from sugar palms (Arenga pinnata) into sugar or ethanol, returning cash and power to the community in the attempt to move toward a better future for the people, forest, and native orangutans, while saving 200,000 trees per year from being cut down as fuel wood.

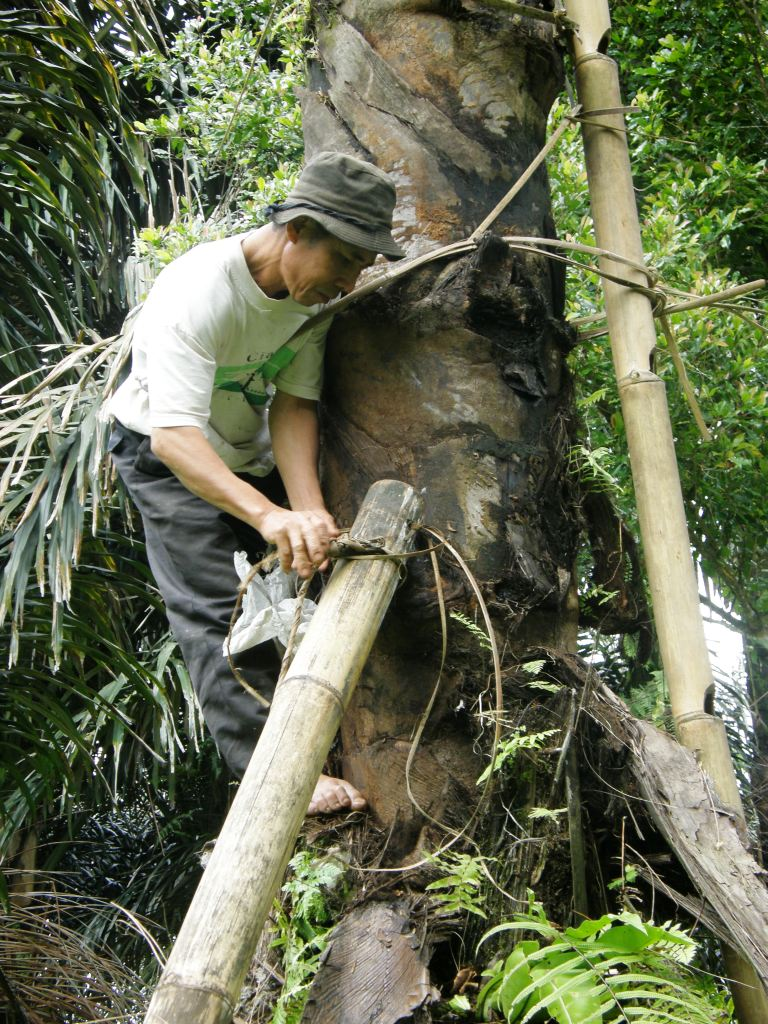
Tapping the sugar palm

In 1980, when Smits proposed to his first wife, in Tomohon, North Sulawesi, he was surprised by the dowry: six sugar palms. At that time, a mature sugar palm that was ready to sap cost about as much as a chicken. Nevertheless, the people of Tomohon wanted sugar palms ("pohon aren") instead of gold as the dowry. "I wondered why it was that cheap," Smits says. Later he learnt the answer, calling the sugar palm a "magic tree". He says of the sugar palm. "From the roots to the leaves, every bit is beneficial for people. Those who eat palm sugar will live longer than those who use cane sugar." During his years of research in North Sulawesi and other places in Indonesia where sugar palms grow, he has learned that people are not making the most of the tree and its properties.

In North Sulawesi's capital, Manado, people sap the trees only to make their traditional alcoholic drink. People in other places sap the trees to make palm sugar or cut them down for sago. But the tree offers more. For one, nira, the white sap obtained, can be processed into ethanol. "My research shows no tree can produce alternative fuel as well as palm trees," Smits said. "Sugar palms can also help the environment. They are effective in preventing landslides, even on really steep land." The high-quality fibres from sugar palms are also widely used; Smits exports them to Europe, where they are among the materials used in the bodies of luxury cars.

Smits has opened a palm sugar factory in Tomohon, managed by PT. Gunung Hijau Massarang, which uses waste steam from the state energy company Pertamina's geothermal powerstation. Every day, about 6,200 farmers produce nira for the factory, which is managed by the Masarang Foundation. The sugar is sold locally and exported to Hong Kong, Australia, Singapore and Europe, where it is known as Masarang Arenga Palm Sugar. He states his "productive, environmentally friendly factory" could become a model for other places in the country. "There are no less than eight provinces that have abundant sugar palms but they have not done much with them," he says. He believes that if Indonesia made the most of its sugar palms, then in two years there would be no need to import sugar any more. For this purpose, he designed, prototyped and patented the so-called Village Hub.

According to Smits' talks for Qi Global and TED, both Samboja Lestari and the Masarang foundation have evolved on the principles of People, Planet, Profit. Smits has demonstrated how community capacity-building and community empowerment can promote economic development while conserving the natural environment.

== Orangutan confiscations ==
With a team of BOS staff and forestry officers, Smits confiscates orangutans kept illegally as pets. When an orangutan is confiscated from a home the family is given medicines to fight the parasites they may have contracted from the orangutan. (Smits himself recalls three days in hospital on chemotherapy to fight the lungworms and other parasites that threatened his life.)

Confiscations are inevitably confrontational at times, and there have been numerous death threats made against Smits.

== Primate Centre at Jakarta Zoo ==
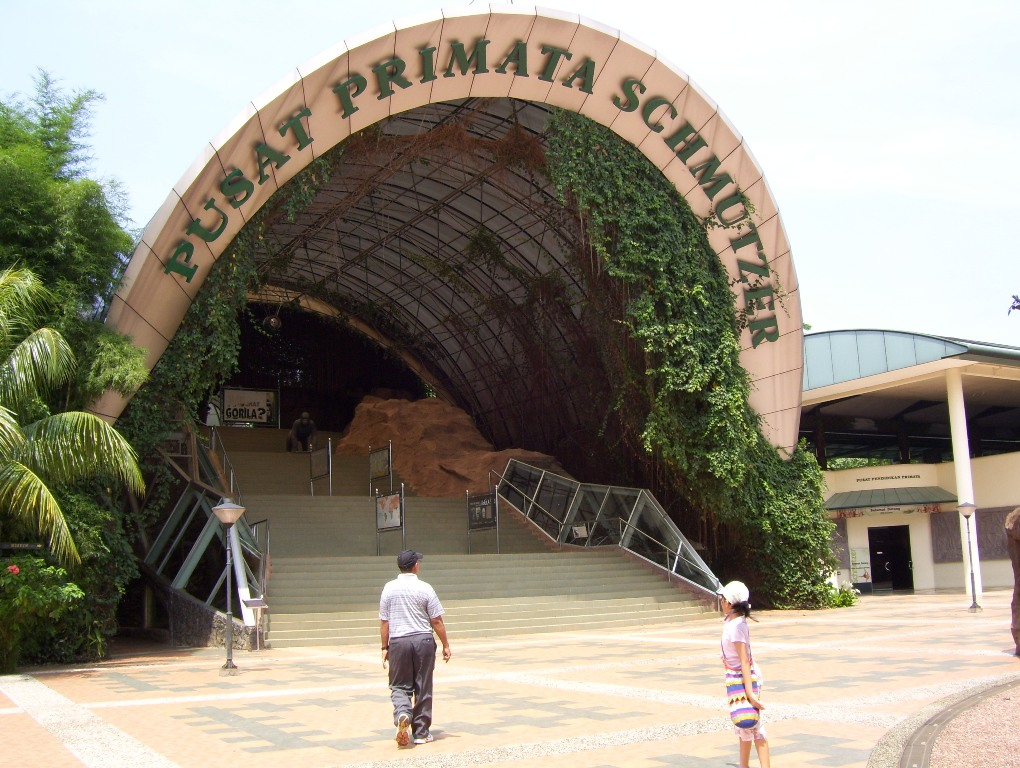
The Schmutzer Primate Centre, Jakarta

Smits designed the Schmutzer Primate Centre at the Ragunan Zoo which opened in 2002 so that the orangutans have freedom and privacy in a habitat with a variety of forest trees and plants, a waterfall and water with turtles and fish, and small animals like porcupines and deer mice. Thick dark glass allows visitors to see the orangutans while being invisible to them.

Smits initially had no interest in zoos, but now sees it as a sanctuary for sick, injured and blind confiscated orangutans (the healthy ones are taken to Borneo Orangutan Survival Foundation rehabilitation centres for eventual release into the wild).

== Other work ==
Smits has continued to be involved in the study of the mycorrhizal fungi that improve the uptake of water and nutrients from the soil by the meranti tree. By using this fungus he has achieved faster growth of young seedlings. He is beside his current work for the orangutans at Wanariset, the chairman of the Gibbon Foundation and consultant for the Indonesian Orangutan Survival Program.

In 2006 Smits launched TV 5 Dimensi, commonly referred to as TV5D, a North Sulawesi local television channel, based in Tomohon.

An increasing amount of Smits' activity has been in disseminating information, outreach, education, and public awareness-raising, his talks for Qi Global and TED, being examples of this.

== Recognition ==
Smits received the first non-Indonesian Satya Lencana Pembangunan Award (1998). He has the equivalent of a knighthood from the Netherlands for his conservation work, and was elected to the Ashoka Fellowship in 2009.

In 2018, Smits was noted in the book Rescuing Ladybugs by author and animal advocate Jennifer Skiff. According to Skiff, Smits has facilitated as of 2018 the rescue of 1300 orangutans, has established 114 conservation projects in Indonesia, including "setting up sanctuaries in twenty-eight locations throughout the country".

== Writing ==
Thinkers of the Jungle - The Orangutan Report: Pictures, Facts, Background gives an account of the life, behaviour and fate of orangutans. Authors Willie Smits and Gerd Schuster outline the threat to the orangutan's survival: economical and political interests, exploitation of nature and human ignorance and greed. The book is illustrated by more than 350 photographs by war photographer Jay Ullal.

== Documentaries ==
Smits and his work appeared in a number of documentaries, including:

- Dying for a Biscuit on BBC Panorama
- Dirt Rich: Power beneath our feet directed by Marcelina Cravat
