= Tomohon =

City in North Sulawesi, Indonesia

- City
- City of Tomohon; Kota Tomohon
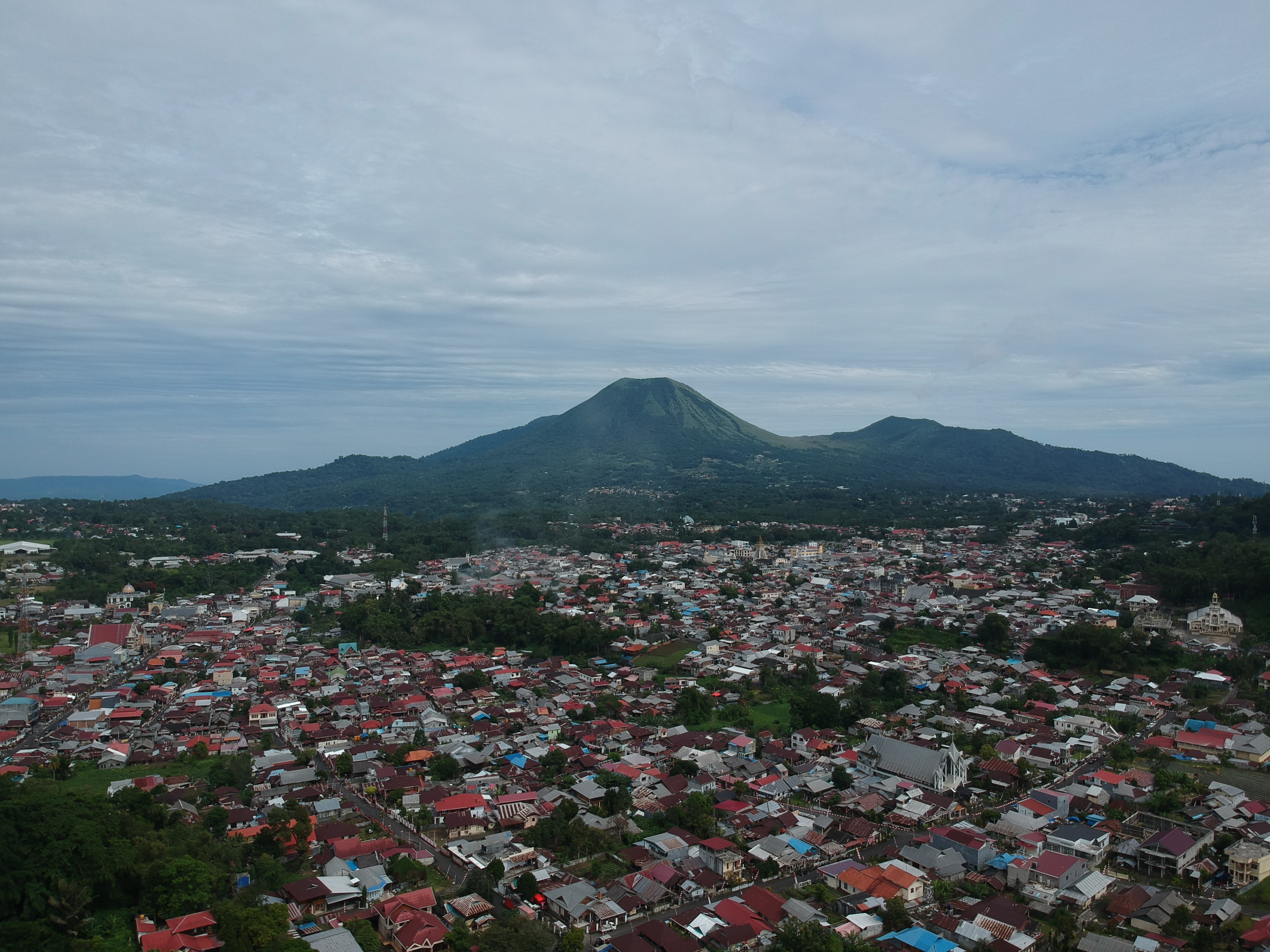
- City of Tomohon

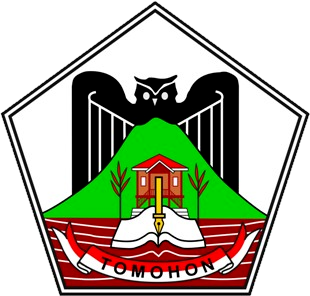
- Coat of arms

- Location within North Sulawesi
- Interactive map of Tomohon
- Location in Sulawesi and Indonesia Tomohon (Indonesia)
- Coordinates: 1°19′30″N 124°50′20″E
- Country: Indonesia
- Province: North Sulawesi
- Established: 25 February 2003
- Inauguration: 4 August 2003

Government
  - Mayor: Caroll Joram Azarias Senduk
  - Vice Mayor: Sendy Gladys Adolfina Rumajar

Area
  - Total: 169.10 km^{2} (65.29 sq mi)

Population (mid 2025 estimate)
  - Total: 104,260
  - Density: 616.56/km^{2} (1,596.9/sq mi)
- Time zone: UTC+8 (Indonesia Central Time)
- Postcodes: 954xx
- Area code: (+62) 431
- Vehicle registration: DB
- Website: www.tomohon.go.id

Tomohon is a landlocked city in North Sulawesi, Indonesia. It covers an area of 147.21 km^{2}, and had a population of 91,553 at the 2010 Census, rising to 100,587 at the 2020 Census. The official estimate as at mid 2025 was 104,260 (comprising 52,663 males and 51,597 females). Tomohon was formerly a part of the Minahasa Regency in North Sulawesi, but it officially became a city separated from the Regency, inaugurated on 4 August 2003.

Tomohon is known for flower planting at people's homes. Nearby is the volcano Gunung Lokon or Mount Lokon and Mount Empung. Tomohon is also known for wooden-house production, palm-sugar (aren ) production, vegetable agriculture, as a center of Christian Ministry, and as a student town.

== History ==
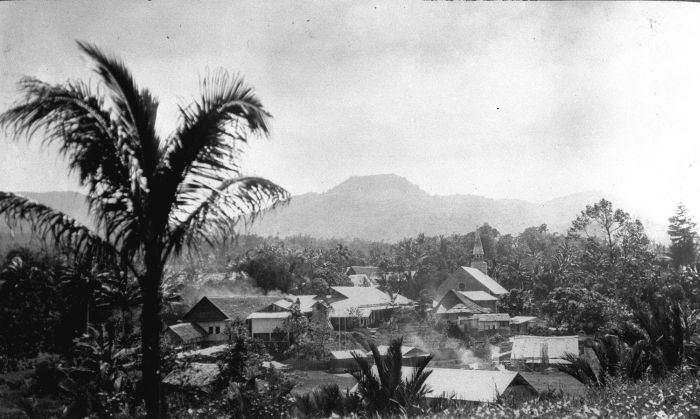
Cityscape of Tomohon in 1924

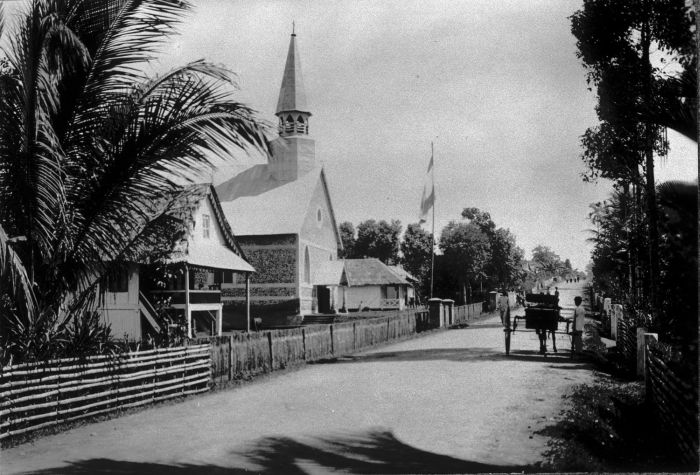
Tomohon highway in 1900-1920

Tomohon has been written about in several historical records. One of them was found in the ethnographic works of Reverend Nicolaas Graafland, written on 14 January 1864. He described a heart-capturing country on the Minahasa highland in Northern Celebes (Sulawesi) called Tomohon that he had visited in 1850. The development of civilization and the dynamics of development and social implementation from year to year made Tomohon one of the capital districts in the Minahasa regency. In the beginning, Tomohon was a district of the Toumbulu people located in northwestern Minahasa, which consists of Talete, Kamasi, Paslaten, Kolongan, and Matani. In 1880, the Sarongsong district was united into Tomohon, and Kakaskasen district was combined in 1908. In 1927, Tomohon was integrated into Manado as a district, and in 1935, Tombariri district was combined with Tomohon district under Manado. In 1945, Tomohon was separated from Manado and again became the Tomohon district with two subdistrict: Tomohon and Tombariri. During the Permesta between March 1956 and October 1961, some of the Tombariri was combined with Tomohon. In 1974–2003, Tomohon was a district under the Minahasa Regency.

In the early decades of the 2000s, people in some parts of the Minahasa regency bore inspiration and aspirations of the strategic environmental trends both internally and externally for regional expansion. Efforts at reformation and the implementation of regional autonomy had been accelerating the process of accommodation people's aspirations for the expansion of the region. Through a long legal process and mature consideration in order to accelerate national development for the welfare of society, then the Minahasa regency government along with the Regional Representatives Council (Dewan Perwakilan Rakyat Daerah - DPRD) of Minahasa Regency recommended the aspirations for the establishment of South Minahasa Regency, Tomohon and North Minahasa Regency; which was also supported by The Provincial Government of North Sulawesi. The formation of South Minahasa Regency and Tomohon was established by the Central Government by issuing the Act No. 10 of 2003 and the establishment of the North Minahasa Regency through Act No. 33 of 2003.

The establishment of the legislative institution of Tomohon came as election results of 2004, resulting in Tomohon Regional Regulation Number 22 Year 2005 about Regional Symbol and Regulations of Tomohon and No. 29 of 2005 about the Anniversary of Tomohon. Tomohon inaugurated the Minister of Home Affairs Hari Sabarno on behalf of the President of the Republic of Indonesia on 4 August 2003.

== Geography ==
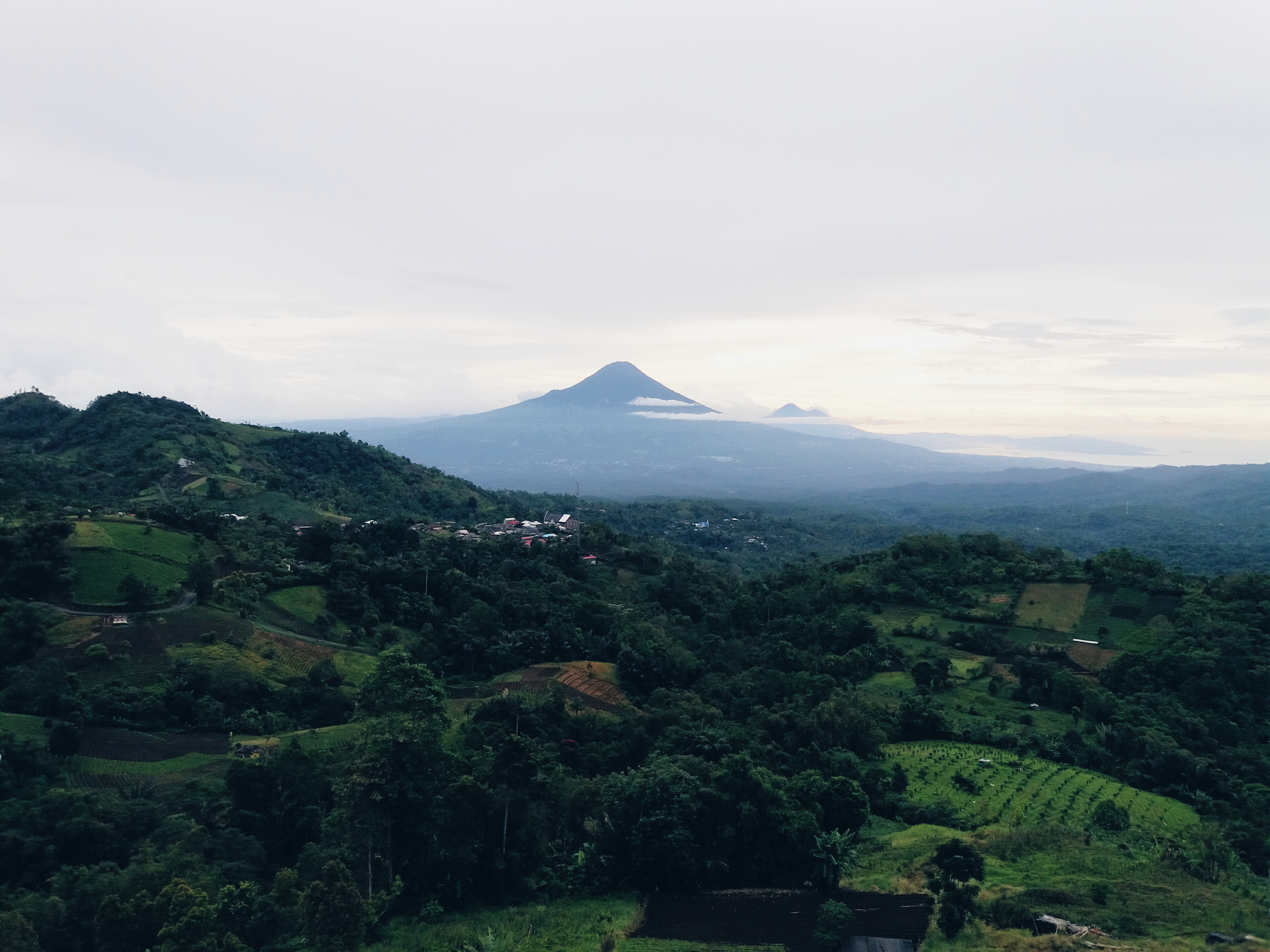
Natural scenery in Tomohon

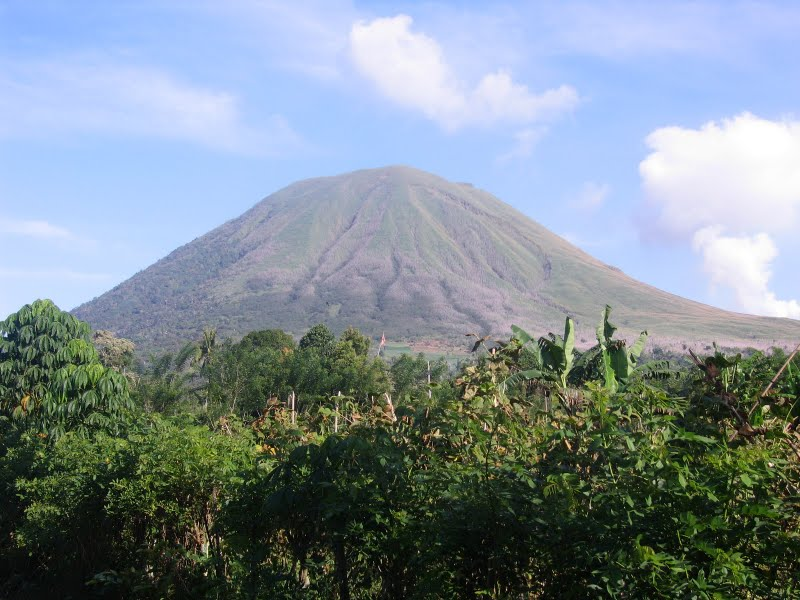
Mt. Lokon

Tomohon is located at 1°15' North and 124°50' East. Tomohon, formed by Law No. 10 of 2003) is 14,721 hectares (36,380 acres) in area, with a population of 100,587 inhabitants at the 2020 Census. In general, Tomohon is located on the main circulation route connecting Manado as the provincial capital and other cities in North Sulawesi. Tomohon is surrounded by Minahasa Regency, with the borders of the area are:

- North: Pineleng and Tombulu District, Minahasa Regency
- South: Remboken and Sonder District, Minahasa Regency
- West: Tombariri District, Minahasa Regency
- East: Tombulu and West Tondano District, Minahasa Regency

The geography of Tomohon is located in the Asian portion of the Pacific Ring of Fire, flanked by two active volcanoes, those are Mount Lokon (1,689 m or 5,541 ft) and Mount Mahawu (1,311 m or 4,301 ft). The area is mostly made of young volcanic rock, with a composition of andesitic and basaltic tuff, and is of a brittle nature and easily eroded. The material component of the volcanic eruption with a cool temperature increase the fertile soil, and for the people taking advantage to produces fruits, vegetables, and flowers. In the southern, there's a Lake Linow, a naturally formed crater from volcanic eruption. Around the lake, there are various geothermal manifestation such as hot springs, fumarole, and also mud pool.

=== Climate ===
Tomohon has a cooler temperature than Manado (Tomohon's neighbor city) which is at a lower land nearby the sea. Tomohon is situated at an altitude of about 700–1,000 metres (2,300–3,300 ft) above sea level (asl), Temperatures in Tomohon in the daytime are between 17–30 °C (63–86 °F) and 16–24 °C (61–75 °F) at night. Tomohon has a tropical rainforest climate (Köppen climate classification Af), with a significant amount of rainfall during the year even for the driest month.

Climate data for Tomohon, Indonesia
Month	Jan	Feb	Mar	Apr	May	Jun	Jul	Aug	Sep	Oct	Nov	Dec	Year
Mean daily maximum °C (°F)	25.7 (78.3)	25.7 (78.3)	26.1 (79.0)	26.6 (79.9)	26.6 (79.9)	26.3 (79.3)	26.3 (79.3)	26.9 (80.4)	27.2 (81.0)	27.5 (81.5)	26.9 (80.4)	26.1 (79.0)	26.5 (79.7)
Daily mean °C (°F)	21.8 (71.2)	21.7 (71.1)	22.1 (71.8)	22.3 (72.1)	22.6 (72.7)	22.3 (72.1)	22.3 (72.1)	22.5 (72.5)	22.4 (72.3)	22.6 (72.7)	22.4 (72.3)	22.0 (71.6)	22.3 (72.0)
Mean daily minimum °C (°F)	17.9 (64.2)	17.8 (64.0)	18.2 (64.8)	18.1 (64.6)	18.7 (65.7)	18.4 (65.1)	18.3 (64.9)	18.1 (64.6)	17.6 (63.7)	17.7 (63.9)	18.0 (64.4)	18.0 (64.4)	18.1 (64.5)
Average precipitation mm (inches)	257 (10.1)	211 (8.3)	215 (8.5)	221 (8.7)	250 (9.8)	175 (6.9)	121 (4.8)	91 (3.6)	117 (4.6)	180 (7.1)	241 (9.5)	245 (9.6)	2,324 (91.5)
Average relative humidity (%)	89	88	84	82	76	79	65	58	57	59	86	87	75.8
Source 1: Climate-Data.org
Source 2: Badan Pusat Statistik Kota Tomohon (humidity only)

== Administration ==
The city area based on the Village Potential Data 2014 was formerly calaculated as being 147.21 km^{2}, but is now officially measured at 169.1 km^{2}. The city administration is divided into 5 districts (kecamatan) and subdivided into 44 urban villages (kelurahan). The mayor (walikota) leads the city administration. The first mayor of Tomohon was Boy Simon Tangkawarouw. Since 2005, city residents have directly voted for a mayor, and Jefferson SM Rumajar elected as the first definitive mayor.

=== Administrative districts ===
The city is divided into five districts (kecamatan) tabulated below with their areas and their areas and their populations as at the 2010 Census and the 2020 Census, together with the official estimates as at mid 2025. The table also includes the location of the district headquarters, the number of administrative villages or subdistricts (all classed as urban kelurahan) in each district, and its postal codes.

Kode Wilayah	Name of District (kecamatan)	Area in km^{2}	Pop'n Census 2010	Pop'n Census 2020	Pop'n Estimate mid 2025	Admin centre	No. of subdistricts	Post codes
71.73.01	Tomohon Selatan (South Tomohon)	34.70	21,062	24,802	26,507	Walian	12	95431-95439
71.73.02	Tomohon Tengah (Central Tomohon)	16.51	20,156	18,772	18,924	Talete Dua	9	95441-95445
71.73.05	Tomohon Timur (East Tomohon)	13.99	10,269	11,428	11,297	Paslaten Satu	5	95446-95449
71.73.04	Tomohom Barat (West Tomohon)	43.84	14,160	16,941	17,704	Woloan Satu Utara	8	95421-95425
71.73.03	Tomohon Utara (North Tomohon)	60.06	25,906	28,644	29,828	Kakaskasen	10	95411-95419
	Totals	169.10	91,553	100,587	104,260		44	

== Community based ecotourism ==
In general, Community Based Ecotourism (CBET) is tourism that is managed by the community for the tourist destinations. With general tourism, tourist visits are often marketed and organised by private travel companies and government-protected areas where the bulk of the profits go to the private companies and government enterprises. In contrast, CBET is managed and run by the community itself, management decisions are made by local people and profits directly go to the community. CBET itself, is a part of sustainable tourism development, because it meets the needs of the present tourists and host regions while protecting and enhancing the opportunity for the future. It is envisaged as leading to management of all resources in such a way that economic, social and aesthetic needs can be fulfilled, while maintaining cultural integrity, essential ecological processes, biological diversity and life support systems (World Tourism Organisation in Bhoj Raj K Hanal, 2007). In order for community based ecotourism to be successful (sustainable), there are many questions that need to be asked and answered in the planning process through implementation stages. One problem of participatory approaches must be pointed out - what defines “community” and “local” in terms of participation? Communities are not free of conflict, nor they are homogeneous. This fact can complicate any development plans for local communities — communities must agree on representatives for decision-making. According to the Quebec Declaration on ecotourism, ecotourism embraces the principles of sustainable tourism. The following principles distinguish it from the wider concept of sustainable tourism:

1. Contributes actively to the conservation of natural and cultural heritage;
2. Includes local and indigenous communities in its planning, development and operation contributing to their well-being;
3. interprets the natural and cultural heritage of the destination to the visitor; and
4. lends itself better to independent travelers, as well as organizes tours for small sized groups.

== Distinctive features ==
There are several colorful parks in the center of the city with various flowers. The local government of Tomohon City routinely holds an annual flower festival which is able to attract many tourists to come to Tomohon. Other tourism destinations include Lake Linow, waruga (sarcophagus), Tinoor waterfall, Doahill, agritourism in Rurukan, wooden house craft center in Woloan, and amphitheater in Woloan.

Some other tourism destinations nearby Tomohon City are Bunaken sea park, Lake Tondano, Mount Klabat, Mount Soputan, and Kali Waterfall. The 'Visit Tomohon 2008' campaign promoted tourist visits Tomohon. Some of the agendas on Visit Tomohon 2008 were a cultural and music festival, flower exhibition, photography competition, fashion style, and a seminar on flower cultivation.

The city contains the Tomohon Extreme Market, a wet market known for selling exotic animals and wildlife. The market attracted criticism from celebrities and animal activists in Indonesia and abroad for the sale of dog and cat meat as well as slaughter methods used. Following a years-long activist campaign, Tomohon mayor Caroll Senduk signed a law banning dog and cat meat trading at the market in July 2023, and traders at the market agreed not to sell, slaughter, or traffic in dogs and cats. This market has been described as a "cafeteria for animal pathogens" and a "time bomb", because of the risk of zoonosis, similar to the early cluster of COVID-19 cases traced to the Huanan Seafood Market in Wuhan.

== Art and culture ==
Tombulu language is spoken in and around Kota Tomohon.

== Economy ==
Tomohon has been classified as a medium city (based on the total population) and classified as polis city (based on the level of city development). It is an area that developed into a city that still has the nature of agrarianism. It is called agrarian because most of its inhabitants are farmers by their livelihood. In 2016, Tomohon economic activity ranged on 6.22% with gross domestic local product about 2.6 trillion. The local budget is about 645 billion, which are dynamic and passionate as the stimulus of various large-scale events that generate growth impacts. Life expectancy reached 72.95 years, this shows a good health status indicator with a clean and healthy lifestyle. In the road infrastructure that has been on the asphalt until the year 2015 reached 355.21 kilometers and farm roads that have been built in 2015 along the 3.8 kilometers.

== Tourism ==
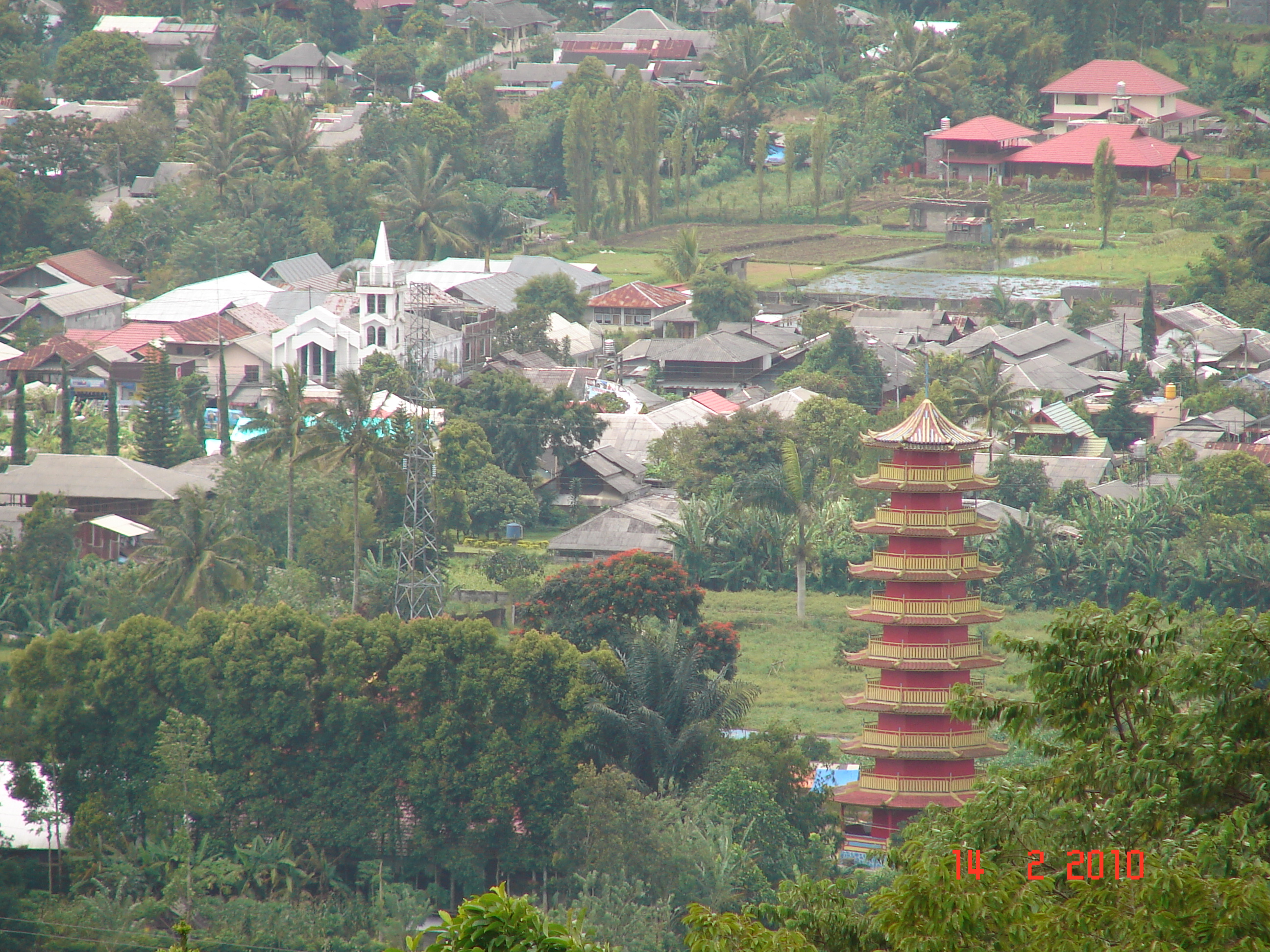
Pagoda in Tomohon

Such tourism attractions in Tomohon are suitable to visit, like the volcanoes Mount Lokon and Mount Empung, which were both active volcanoes until now. Also once a year, Tomohon commences a parade with the Tomohon Flower Festival, and Cap Gomeh, which is a Buddhist Chinese ritual also done in the parade. The parade commences from the northern part of Tomohon which is Kakaskasen through the main city road, until the end of the parade, which usually stops at the "Tololiu Statue" at the center of the city. For better tourism atmosphere through Tomohon, using a traditional horse cart or locally called Bendi, Andong, or Delman runs through the city streets and roads.

== Education ==
Tomohon itself is usually called "Kota Siswa" which means "City of Students" after then it was changed to "Kota Bunga" meaning "City of Flowers" after upgrading the status of their residence into an autonomous city. Tomohon itself provides schools starting from Kindergarten to University education centres; there are also many educational centres in Tomohon for student and school needs. In May 2017, Tomohon has 327 kindergartens, 68 elementary schools, 24 middle schools, and 10 high schools. Tomohon also has several universities such as:

- Education and Psychology Faculty, Manado State University, in Tomohon
- Christian University of Indonesia, Tomohon
- Sariputra Indonesia Tomohon University
- Parakletos Theological Seminary
- St. Luke Academy of Physiotherapy
- Bethesda Nursing Academy
- Nursing Academy of Gunung Maria
- Minaesa Technology Institute

=== Observatories ===
Located inside the Lokon St. Nikolaus campus, there is a Mount Lokon Observatory (MLO). In the observatory's dome which is five meters in diameter there are a Meade LX-200 GPS automatic telescope and a Hunter manual telescope. A special feature of the MLO was that was connected to NASA`s space telescopes. This observatory established since October 2011, and was inaugurated by the North Sulawesi governor Sinyo Sarundajang.

== Transportation ==
Tomohon has a public transportation called bendi, a traditional horse cart. Public transportation is often used is mikrolet. Tomohon Terminal is a transportation hub in Tomohon city, serves the mikrolet transportation to various places inside and outside the city, and also serve bus transportation to Manado.

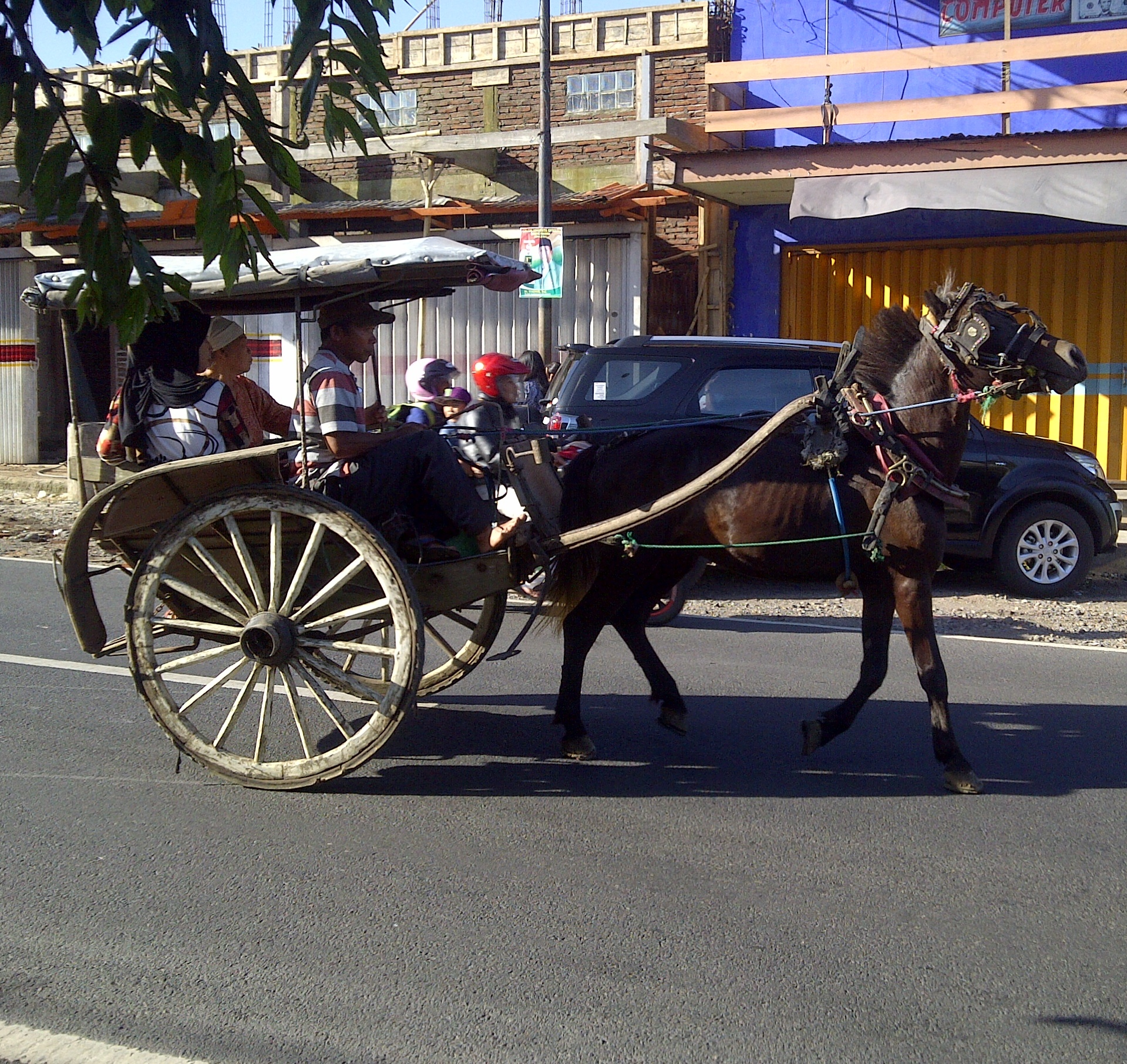
Bendi, the horse cart in Tomohon

== Sister cities ==
- Bethlehem, Palestine
- Okegawa, Japan
