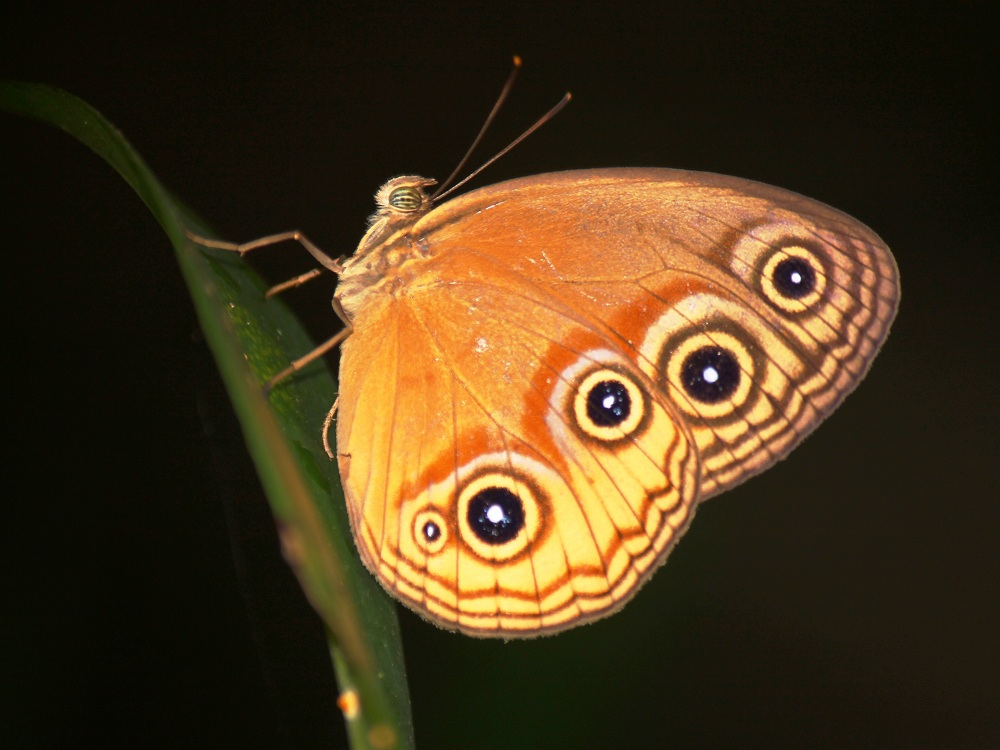
- At Mount Mahawu in North Sulawesi

Scientific classification
- Kingdom: Animalia
- Phylum: Arthropoda
- Class: Insecta
- Order: Lepidoptera
- Family: Nymphalidae
- Subfamily: Satyrinae
- Tribe: Elymniini
- Subtribe: Mycalesina
- Genus: Lohora
- Species: L. ophthalmica

Binomial name
- Lohora ophthalmica (Westwood, 1888)

Synonyms
- Mycalesis ophthalmicus Westwood, 1888; Lohora ophthalmicus

= Lohora ophthalmica =

Species of butterfly

The sulawesi eyed bushbrown (Lohora ophthalmica) is a butterfly in the family Nymphalidae. It is found in north-eastern Sulawesi (Sulawesi mainland, the islands of Buton and Kabaena).

The larvae feed on Centotheca longilamina.

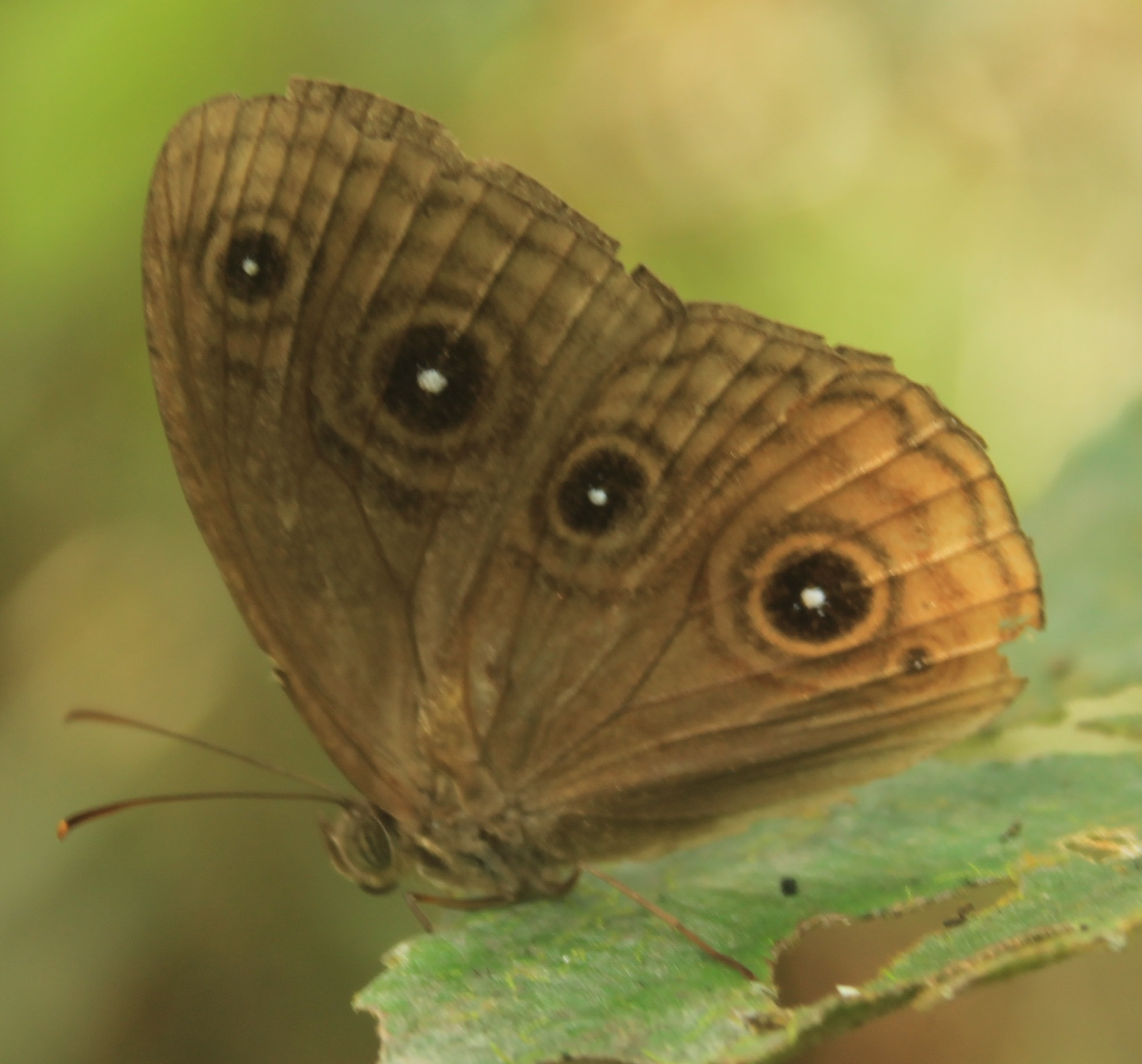

== Sources ==
- Samui Butterflies 22 September 2013
- Sulawesi Samui Butterflies 22 September 2013
- Butterflies of Southeastern Sulawesi 22 September 2013
- Variety of Life 23 September 2013
