= Lake Tondano =

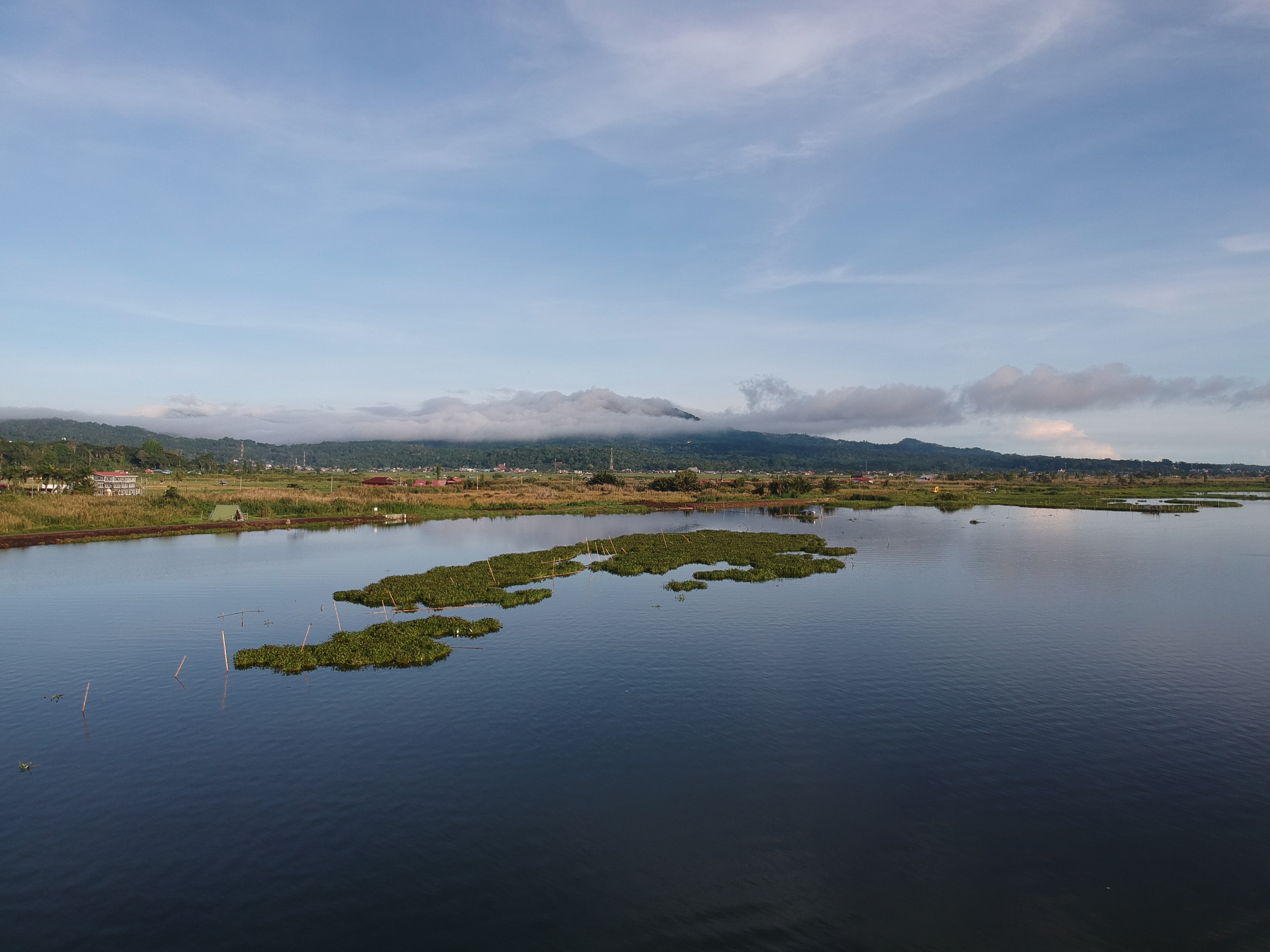
- Lake Tondano

- Location within Indonesia
- Location: North Sulawesi, Indonesia
- Coordinates: 1.225°N 124.900°E
- Type: lake
- Surface elevation: 600 m (2,000 ft)

Lake Tondano is the largest lake in North Sulawesi, Indonesia.

The lake is approximately 36 kilometres (22 mi) from the city of Manado and is 600 metres (2,000 ft) above sea level.

In recent years there have been reports of decreasing water levels at Lake Tondano; from 1934 when it was 40 metres (130 ft), to 1993 to 23 metres (75 ft), 18 metres (59 ft) in 1996 and 12 metres (39 ft) in 2010.

The halfbeak fish Tondanichthys kottelati and calanoid copepod Phyllodiaptomus sulawesensis are endemic to the lake.

== See also ==
- Bunaken National Park
- List of volcanoes in Indonesia
- Manado river
- Mount Klabat
- Mount Sempu
- Mount Soputan
- Tangkoko Batuangus Nature Reserve
