= Masarang Foundation =

Indonesian non-profit organization

Masarang Foundation logo

Masarang Foundation, or Yayasan Masarang in Indonesian language, is an Indonesian non-profit organization, headquartered in Tomohon, North Sulawesi, Indonesia. Officially established on January 17, 2001, via Notary Act No. 175 and registered with the Department of Justice in Tondano (Registration No. 02/YS/2001/PN.TDO) on January 22, 2001. The organization focuses on environmental protection and community development through a holistic model that bridges social welfare, economic stability, and ecological health. Operating under the "People, Planet, Profit" philosophy, the foundation seeks to implement scalable, sustainable strategies to tackle global challenges, including deforestation, biodiversity loss, and rural economic hardship.

== History ==
Masarang Foundation Office in Tomohon, North Sulawesi, Indonesia

Created by conservationist Dr. Willie Smits, the foundation was born out of a desire to address severe environmental degradation in Indonesia while fostering a stronger connection between forest preservation and local livelihoods. The organization has become a pioneer in developing social enterprises that allow local communities to benefit directly from their natural environment without clearing forests. Due to its innovative and impactful work, the foundation's Masarang Palm Sugar Factory project earned recognition as a finalist in the 2007 World Challenge.

== The Masarang Palm Sugar Factory ==
Masarang Foundation has several programs, including scholarships, palm farmer groups, although the foundation is most notably for the Masarang Palm Sugar Factory program, that uses waste steam from the power plant to heat the sugar palm sap . The resulting high-quality product is now being successfully exported - with all profits going direct to the farmer's cooperative . The Masarang Palm Sugar Factory started its production after opening by President Susilo Bambang Yudhoyono on 14 January 2007.

== Vision and Mission ==
=== Vision ===
The foundation envisions a future where ecosystem preservation and local economic prosperity coexist through community-led conservation efforts.

=== Mission ===
The organization's key objectives include:

- Ecosystem restoration: Conducting reforestation and afforestation efforts in Sulawesi and Kalimantan to rehabilitate degraded lands into productive, biodiverse forests.

- Economic empowerment: Training local farmers in sustainable agricultural practices to provide stable incomes while ensuring the preservation of the sugar palm trees.

- Wildlife protection: Operating wildlife rescue and rehabilitation facilities, such as the Tasikoki Wildlife Rescue Centre, for animals impacted by illegal trade.

- Renewable energy development: Promoting the use of eco-friendly energy, including technologies that utilize waste heat to assist in agricultural processing.

== Contribution and Impact ==
The Masarang Foundation has gained international recognition for its role in supporting climate resilience and biodiversity conservation. A significant contribution is its forest rehabilitation program, which has demonstrated the ability to transform barren lands into green areas in just three years using agroforestry methods. Furthermore, the foundation acts as a hub for education and advocacy, working to dismantle illegal wildlife trade networks and protect endangered species like the leatherback turtle along the coast of Sulawesi.
