= Mount Tangkoko =

Stratovolcano on Sulawesi, Indonesia

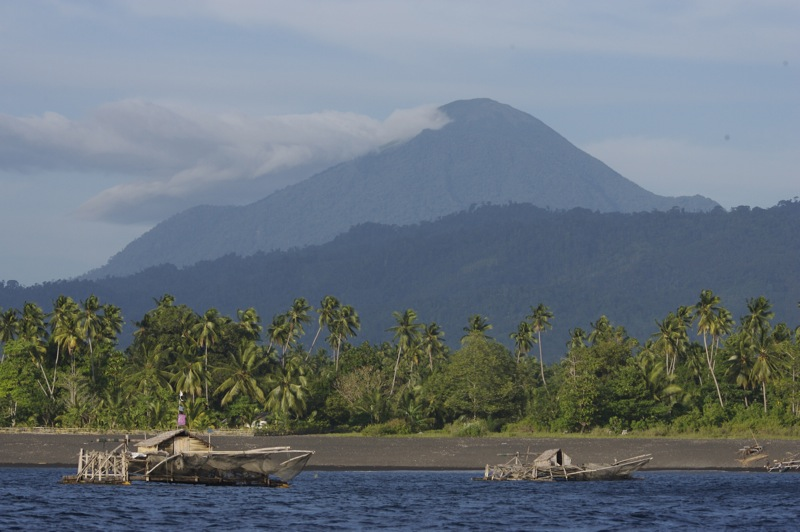
- Mount Tangkoko as viewed from the sea

Highest point
- Elevation: 1,113 m (3,652 ft)
- Coordinates: 1°31′05″N 125°11′06″E

Dimensions
- Width: 3 km × 1.5 km (1.86 mi × 0.93 mi)

Geography
- Location within Sulawesi
- Country: Indonesia
- Region: Sulawesi
- Province: North Sulawesi
- Regency: Minahasa

Geology
- Mountain type: stratovolcano with lava dome
- Rock types: andesite / basaltic andesite; basalt / picro basalt; dacite
- Last eruption: 1880; 146 years ago

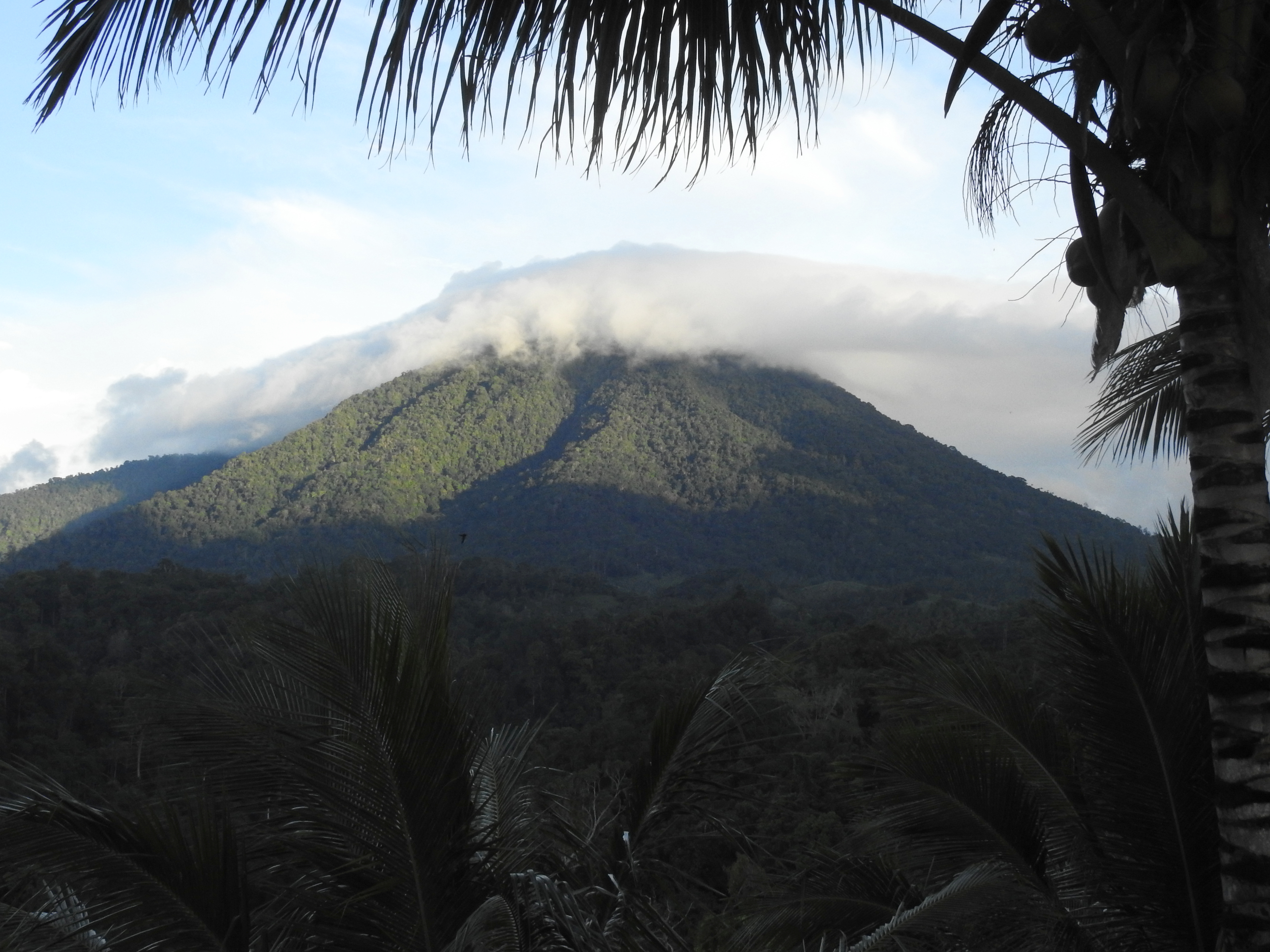
Mount Tangkoko summit blanketed in cloud, its flanks covered in dense vegetation

Mount Tangkoko is a stratovolcano in the north of Sulawesi island in Indonesia. Its summit has an elongated deep crater.On the east flank is a flat lava dome, Batu Angus. Historical records only show eruptions in the 17th and 19th centuries, including a possible VEI5 eruption in 1680.

The Tangkoko Batuangus Nature Reserve, in the northern part of Sulawesi island, is named after the volcano and home to such species as the Celebes crested macaque and spectral tarsier.

== See also ==
- List of volcanoes in Indonesia
