= Mount Mahawu =

Mountain in North Sulawesi, Indonesia

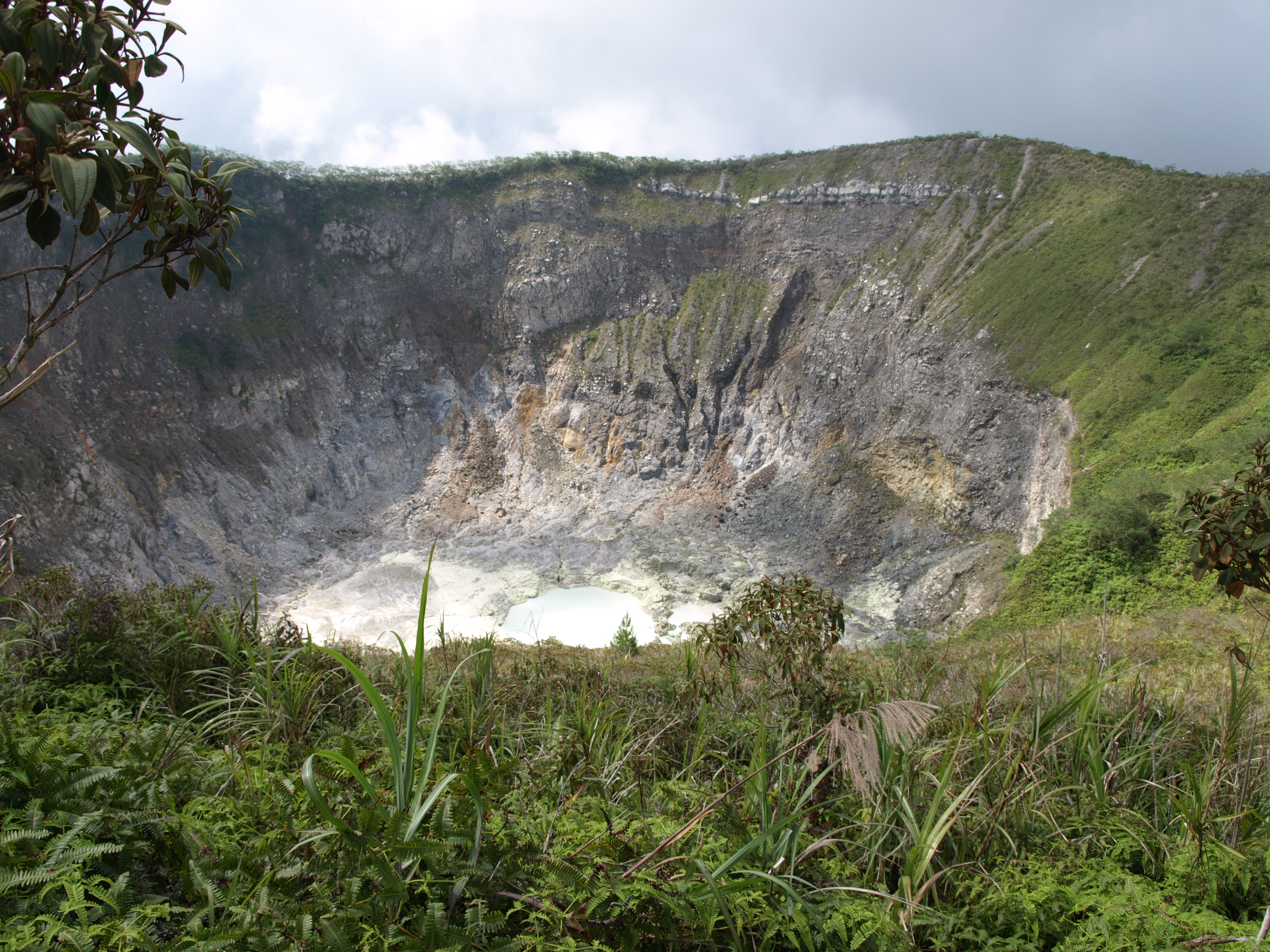
- Crater

Highest point
- Elevation: 1,324 m (4,344 ft)
- Coordinates: 1°21′29″N 124°51′29″E

Geography
- Location within Sulawesi
- Location: Sulawesi, Indonesia

Geology
- Mountain type: Stratovolcano
- Last eruption: November 1977

Mount Mahawu is a stratovolcano located immediately east from Lokon-Empung volcano in North Sulawesi, Indonesia. The volcano is capped with 180 m wide and 140 m deep crater with two pyroclastic cones in the northern flanks. A small explosive eruption was recorded in 1789. In 1994, fumaroles, mudpots and small geysers activities were observed along the greenish shore of a crater lake.

== See also ==
- List of volcanoes in Indonesia
