= Mount Lokon =

Mountain in North Sulawesi, Indonesia

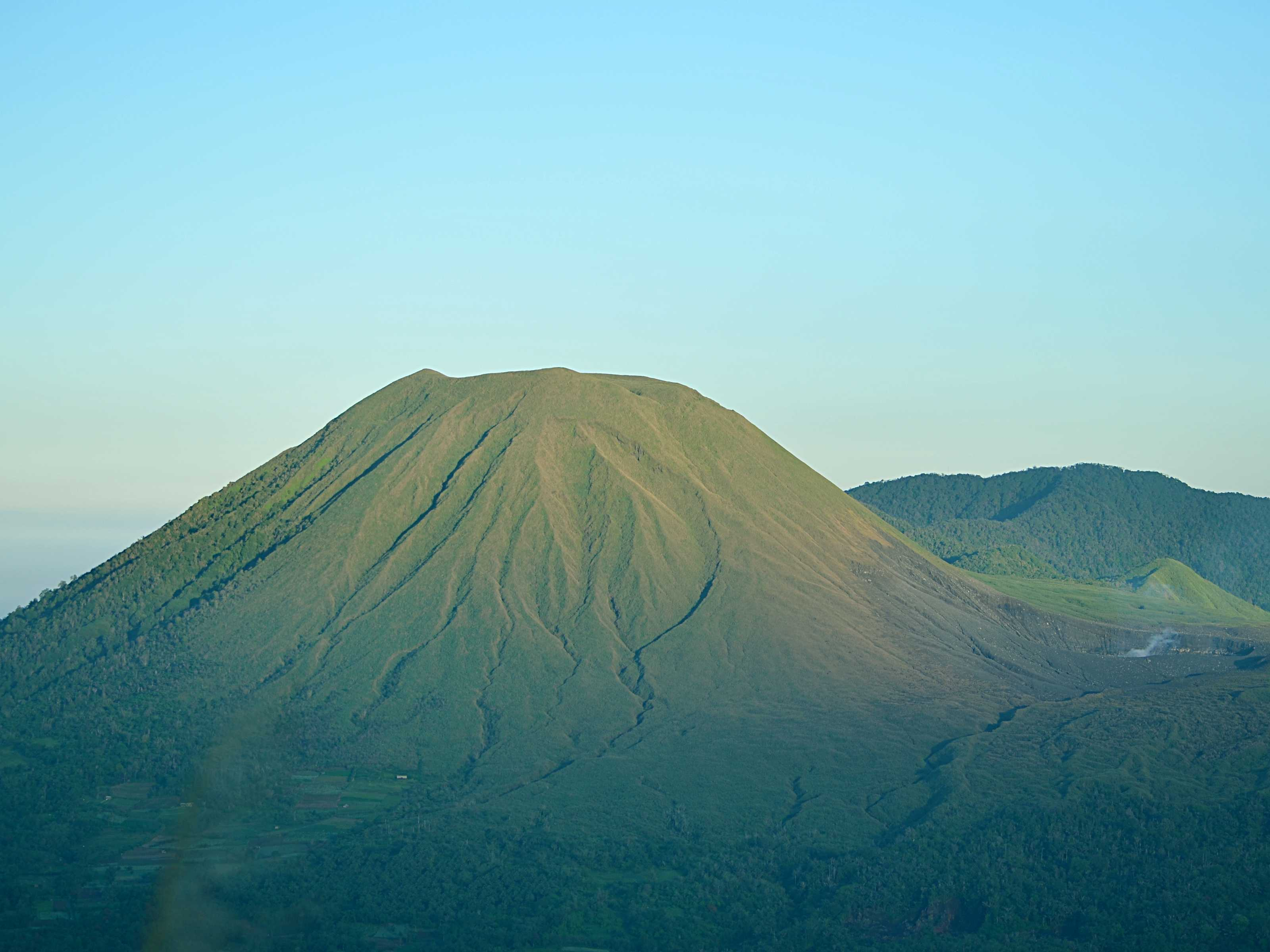

Highest point
- Elevation: 1,580 m (5,180 ft)
- Listing: Ribu
- Coordinates: 1°21′30″N 124°47′30″E

Naming
- English translation: Mountain of Rice Fields
- Language of name: Indonesian

Geography
- Location within Sulawesi
- Location: Sulawesi, Indonesia

Geology
- Rock age: 400,000 years
- Mountain type: Stratovolcano
- Last eruption: May 2015 (ongoing)

Mount Lokon (Indonesian: Lo'kon), also known as Gunung Lokon, together with Mount Empung, is a twin volcano (2.2 km or 1.4 mi apart) in the Tomohon, Minahasa Regency, North Sulawesi, Indonesia, roughly 10 km (6 mi) south of Manado. Both rise above the Tondano plain and are among active volcanoes of Sulawesi. Mount Lokon has a flat and craterless top. Its active crater is located on its foot, named "Tompaluan" crater.

== History ==
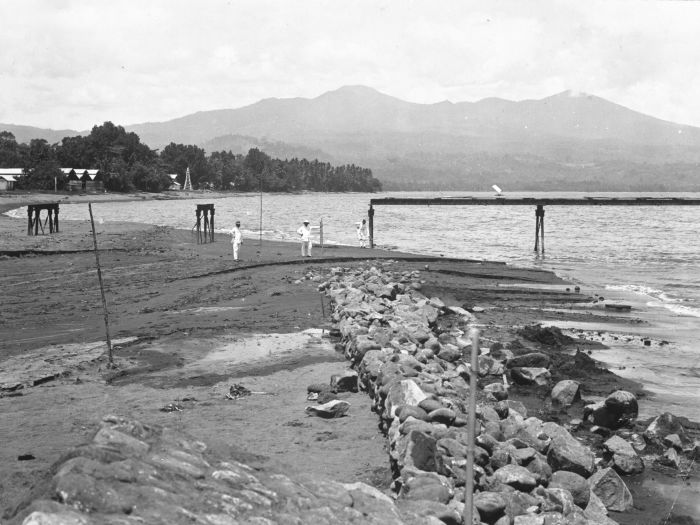
Mount Lokon view from the Pier of Manado bay, captured in 1920

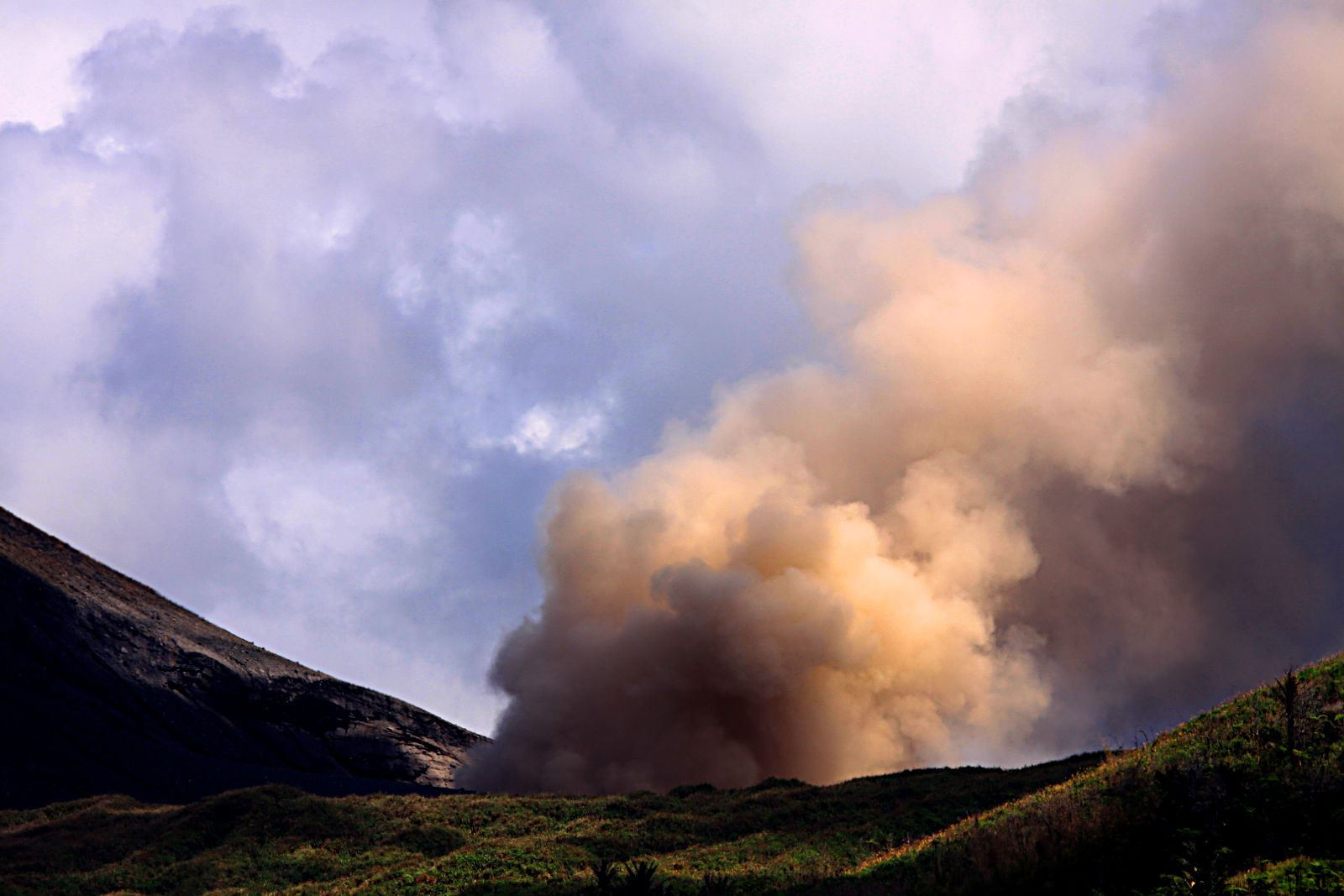
Mount Lokon erupting in 2011

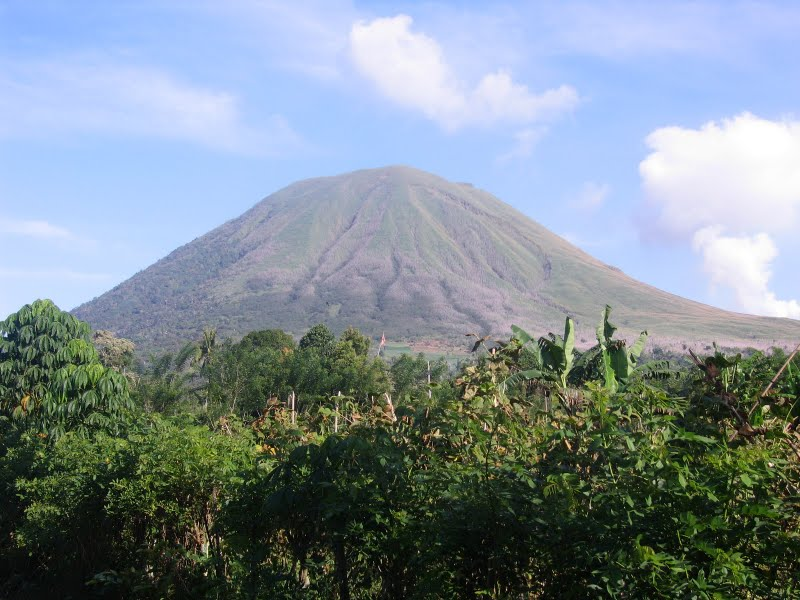
Mount Lokon view from Tomohon

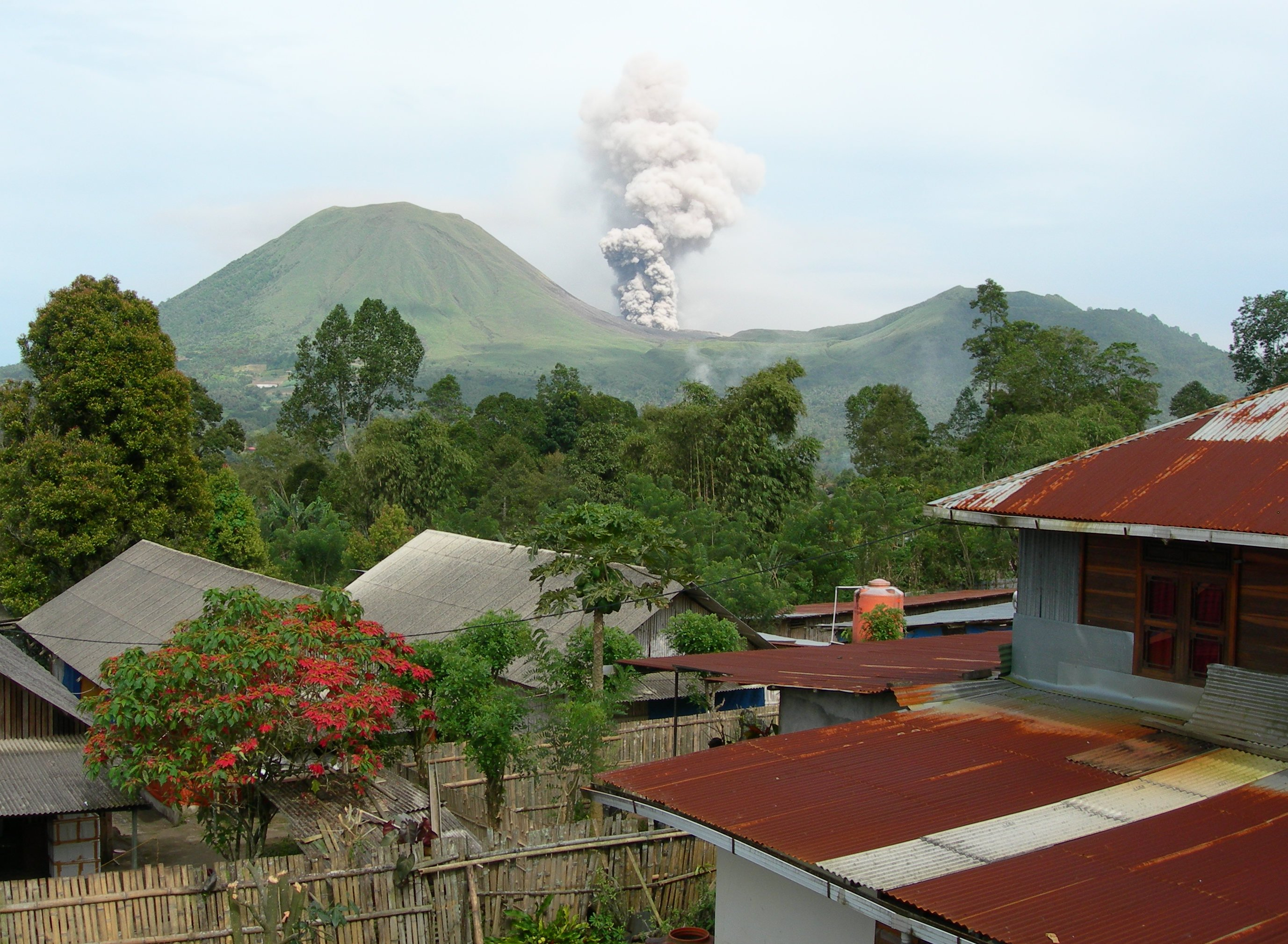
Mount Lokon unleashes an ash plume, seen from the foothills village near Tompaluan

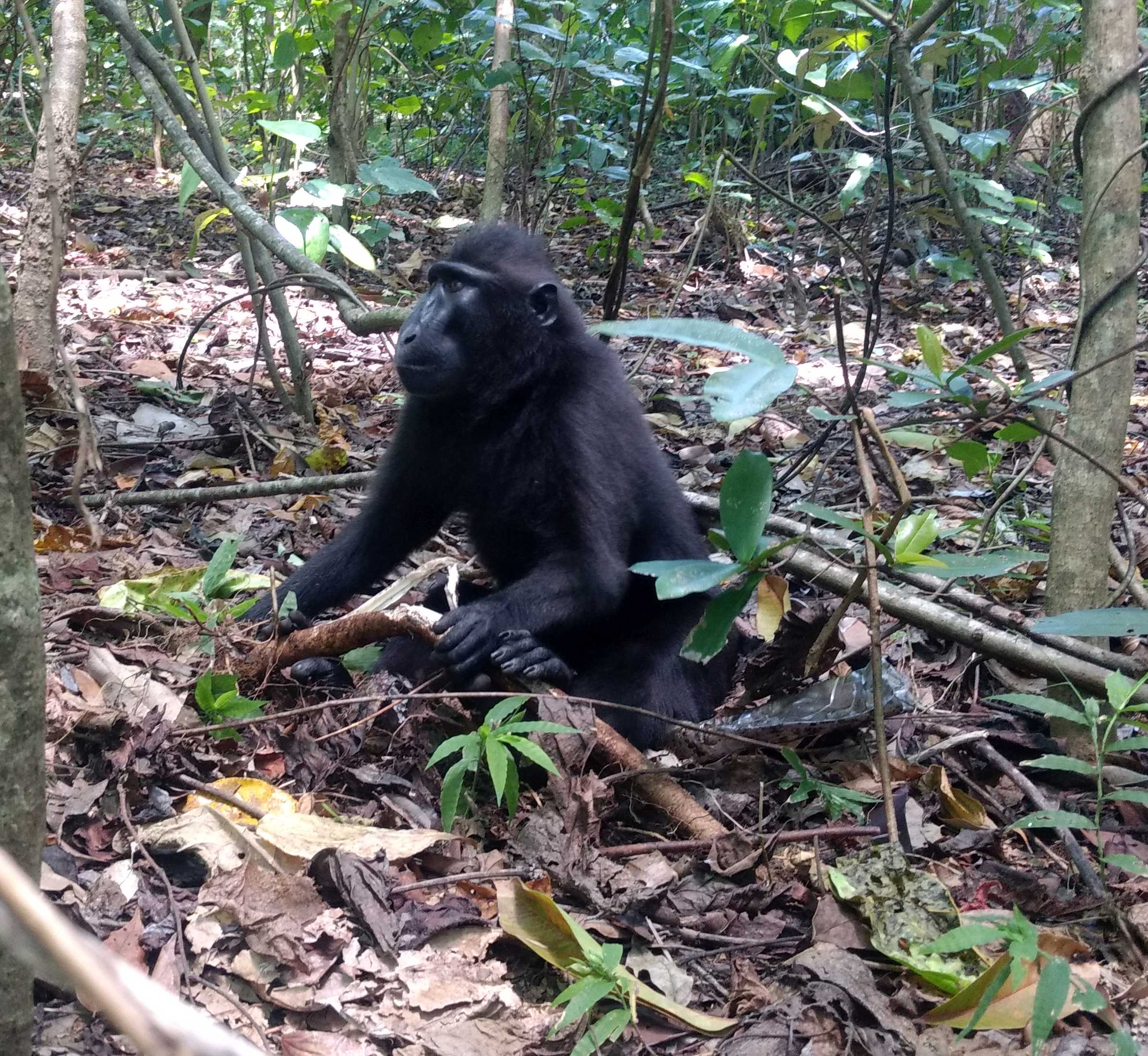
Black crested macaques living in the Lokon nature reserve

Lokon formed during a period of andesitic volcanism on ring fractures resulting from the Tondano caldera's early to mid-Pleistocene collapse. Recently erupted material remains andesitic in composition and consists of ash plumes and, less commonly, pyroclastic flows and lava domes.

The volcano erupted on 15 July 2011, forcing thousands of people to evacuate.

The volcano again began showing signs of activity on 10 February 2012, and 19 September 2012 (11:01pm). An eruption occurred at 8:20, am the same day sending an ash plume two miles into the sky. Local residents were evacuated from a two and a half mile exclusion zone around the volcano. An eruption occurred on 17 December 2012.

Indonesia has 129 volcanoes including Mount Lokon. The eruption of Mount Lokon in 1991 killed a Swiss hiker and forced thousands of people to flee their homes.

== See also ==
- List of volcanoes in Indonesia
