= Mount Empung =

Mountain in Sulawesi, Indonesia

- Gunung Empung
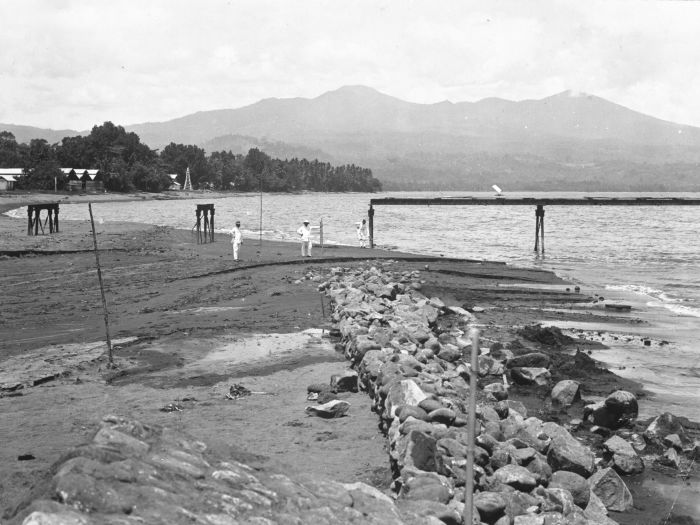
- Mount Empung and Mount Lokon seen from Manado Bay.

Highest point
- Elevation: 1,340 m (4,400 ft)
- Listing: Volcanoes in Indonesia
- Coordinates: 1°21′30″N 124°47′30″E

Geography
- Location within Sulawesi
- Location: Sulawesi, Indonesia

Geology
- Mountain type: Stratovolcano
- Last eruption: May 2015 (ongoing)

Mount Empung, together with Mount Lokon, is a twin volcano (2.2 km apart) in the North Sulawesi, Indonesia. Both volcanoes rise above the Tondano plain and are among active volcanoes of Sulawesi. Mount Empung has a 400 m wide and 150 m deep crater at the summit that erupted in the eighteenth century.
