= Soputan =

Volcano in Indonesia

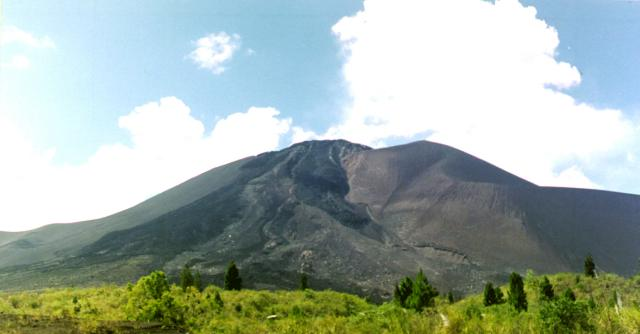

Highest point
- Elevation: 1,785 m (5,856 ft)
- Prominence: 1,425 m (4,675 ft)
- Listing: Ribu
- Coordinates: 1°06′29″N 124°43′48″E

Geography
- Location within Sulawesi
- Location: Sulawesi, Indonesia

Geology
- Mountain type: Stratovolcano
- Last eruption: 2020

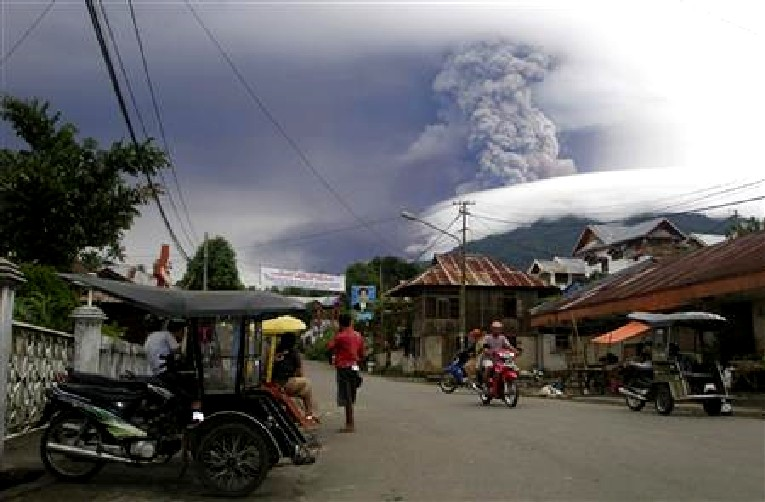
Soputan Volcano erupts, 7 June 2008

Soputan is a stratovolcano in Indonesia. It is on the northern arm of Sulawesi island and rises to an elevation of 1,785 m (5,853 ft). The geologically young and mostly unvegetated cone is primarily constructed of andesite and basalt rock. It sits on the southern rim of the Tondano caldera, which formed in the Quaternary period. The volcano is one of Sulawesi's most active, with 39 confirmed eruptions in the last 600 years. Eruptive activity at Soputan typically consists of pyroclastic flows, lava flows, lava domes and Strombolian-style explosions.

== Eruptions ==
Historical eruptions have taken place at the summit crater, and Aeseput, a vent on the volcano's north-east flank, which was formed in 1906. The volcano has erupted in: 1450, 1785, 1819, 1833, 1845, 1890, 1901, 1906, 1907, 1908–09, 1910, 1911–12, 1913, 1915, 1917, 1923–24, 1947, 1953, 1966–67, 1968, 1970, 1971, 1973, 1982, 1984, 1985, 1989, 1991–96, 2000–03, 2004, 2005, 2005–06, 2006, 2007, 2008, 2011, 2012, 2015, 2016 and 2018.

On the morning of 6 June 2008, Soputan erupted, sending pyroclastic flows as far as 4 km down its slopes, and ash 2 km into the air.

An eruption at 21:03 UTC on 2 July 2011 sent an ash column 5,000 metres into the air.

On 6 January 2015, an eruption began when an explosion caused a partial collapse of a summit lava dome, sending an avalanche down the west flank.

On 4 January 2016, the volcano exploded, sending an ash plume to 2,000m, which prompted the authorities to establish a 4 km exclusion zone around the volcano.

In 2018, Soputan erupted on 3 October, and again twice on 16 December. All three times the volcano spewed a massive column of ash more than 6,000 m (19,700 ft) into the sky. The October eruption occurred about a week after a powerful earthquake and tsunami struck the island.

== Gallery ==
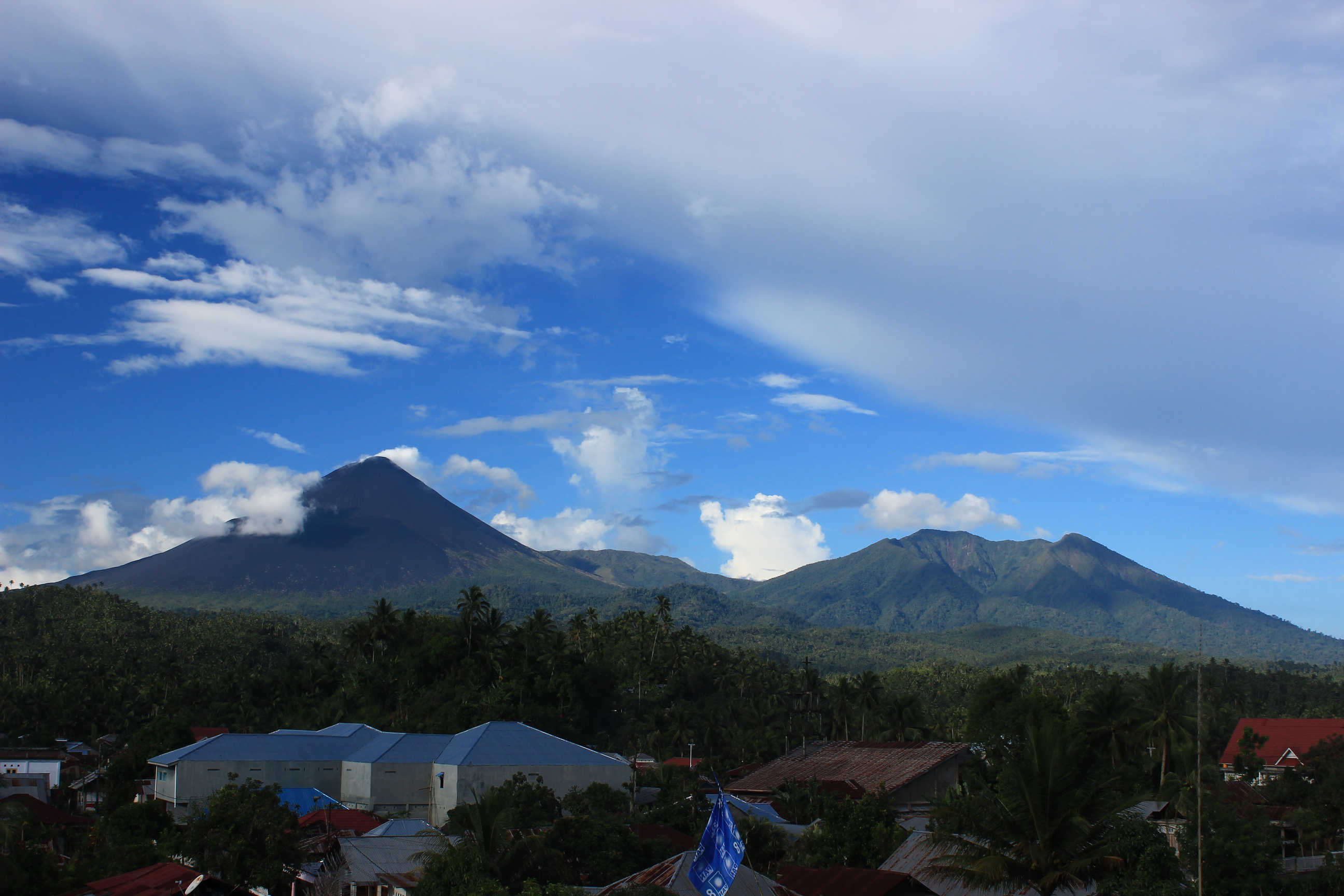
Mt. Soputan (left) and Mt. Manimporok view from Tombatu Village

== See also ==
- List of volcanoes in Indonesia
