= Mount Klabat =

Volcano in Indonesia

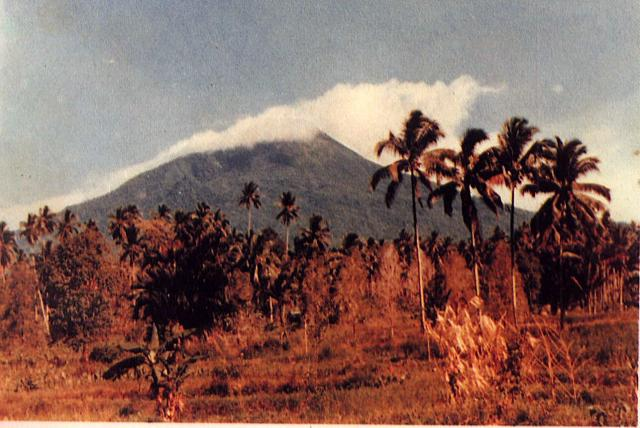
- Mount Klabat in 1981.

Highest point
- Elevation: 1,995 m (6,545 ft)
- Prominence: 1,850 m (6,070 ft)
- Listing: Ultra; Ribu
- Coordinates: 1°27′12″N 125°01′51″E

Geography
- Location within Indonesia
- Location: Sulawesi, Indonesia

Geology
- Mountain type: Stratovolcano

Mount Klabat is the highest volcano on Sulawesi island, located in the east of Manado city, North Sulawesi, Indonesia. A 170 × 250 m wide, shallow crater lake is found at the summit. There are no confirmed historical eruptions of the volcano. A report of an eruption of Mount Klabat taking place in 1683 is actually thought to be an eruption of Mount Tongkoko volcano instead.

== See also ==
- List of volcanoes in Indonesia
- List of ultras of the Malay Archipelago
