= List of mountains in Indonesia =

This is a list of all 270 mountains in or bordering Indonesia which have a topographic prominence of at least 1,000 m (3,300 ft) (named "ribus" from the Indonesia word for "thousand") along with 115 less prominent peaks which are considered to have significant tourist interest, known as "spesials".

The highest peak in Indonesia is Puncak Jaya, also known as Carstensz Pyramid, on the island of New Guinea, at 4,884 m (16,024 ft). It is also the highest point in the continent of Oceania, and one of the world's Seven Summits, and "the highest point between the Himalayas and the Andes". The next three summits by height are Sumantri (4,870 metres, prominence 350m), Puncak Mandala (4,760m, prominence 2,760m), and Puncak Trikora (4,750m, prominence 1,268).

The Indonesian words utara, barat, selatan, timur means north, west, south and east accordingly.

== Ribus and spesials in Bali ==
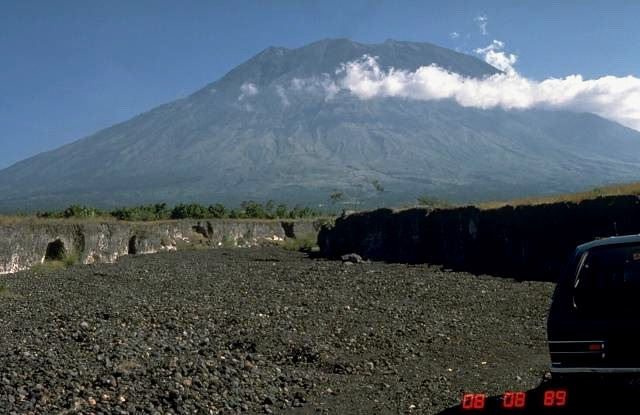
Mount Agung, Indonesia

No	Peak	Elevation (m)	Prominence (m)	Island (m)	Spesial
1	Agung	3,031	3,031	Bali	
2	Batukaru	2,276	1,088	Bali	
2	Batur	1,717	461	Bali	Spesial

== Ribus and spesials in Banten ==
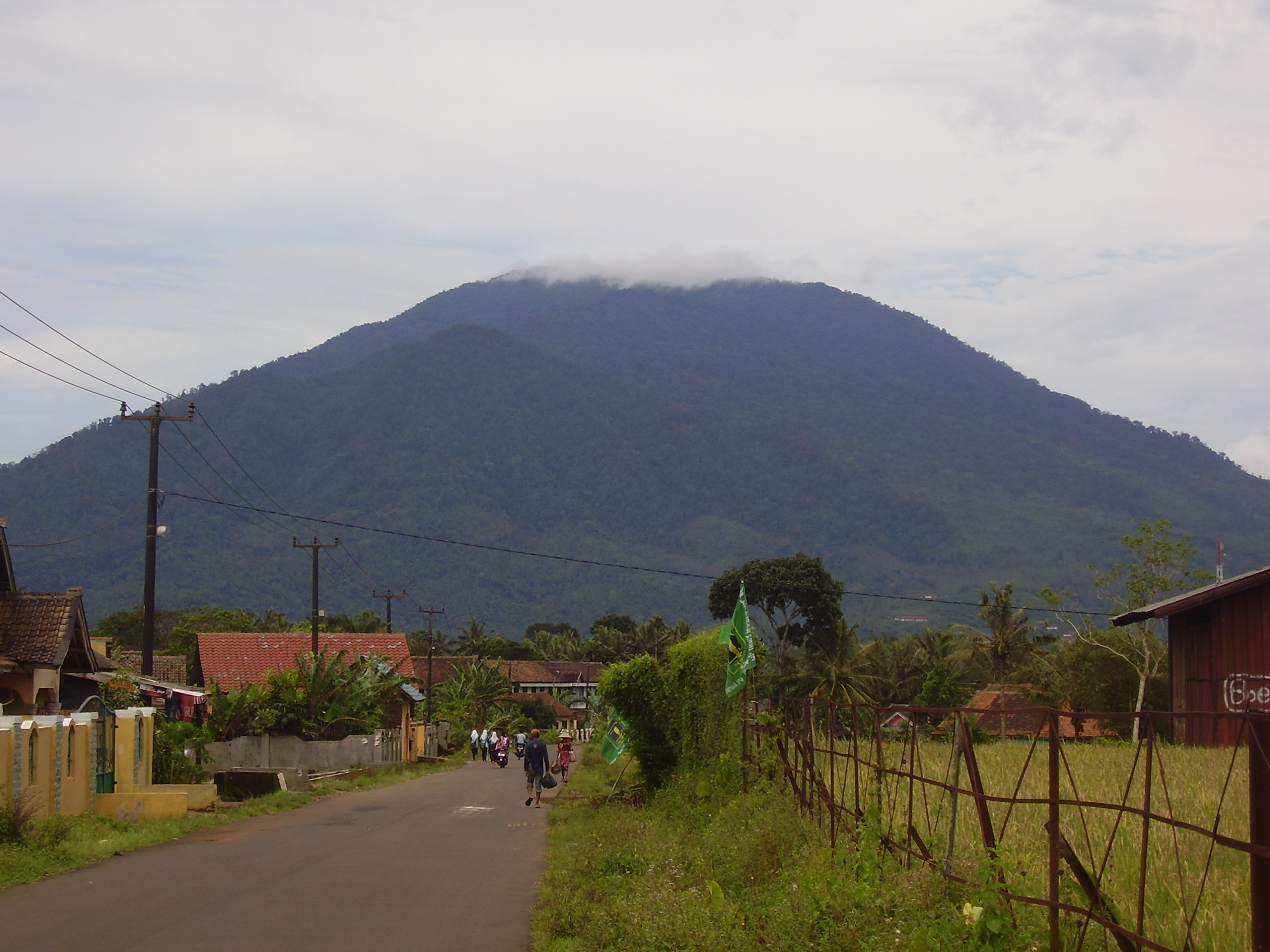
Gunung Karang, Indonesia

No	Peak	Elevation (m)	Prominence (m)	Island (m)	Spesial
1	Gunung Karang	1,778	1,703	Java	
2	Halimun (North)	1,929	938	Java	Spesial
3	Pulosari	1,346	890	Java	Spesial
4	Raksa	329	329	Panaitan	Spesial

== Ribus and spesials in Bengkulu ==
No	Peak	Elevation (m)	Prominence (m)	Island (m)	Spesial
1	Daun	2,493	1,541	Sumatra	
2	Gedang	2,463	1,145	Sumatra	
3	Kaba	1,952	857	Sumatra	Spesial

== Ribus and spesials in Gorontalo ==
No	Peak	Elevation (m)	Prominence (m)	Island (m)	Spesial
1	Tentolomatinan	2,230	1,564	Sulawesi	
2	Boliohutu (Huido Ileile)	2,072	1,227	Sulawesi	
3	Dapi	1,694	1,167	Sulawesi	

== Ribus and spesials in Jambi ==
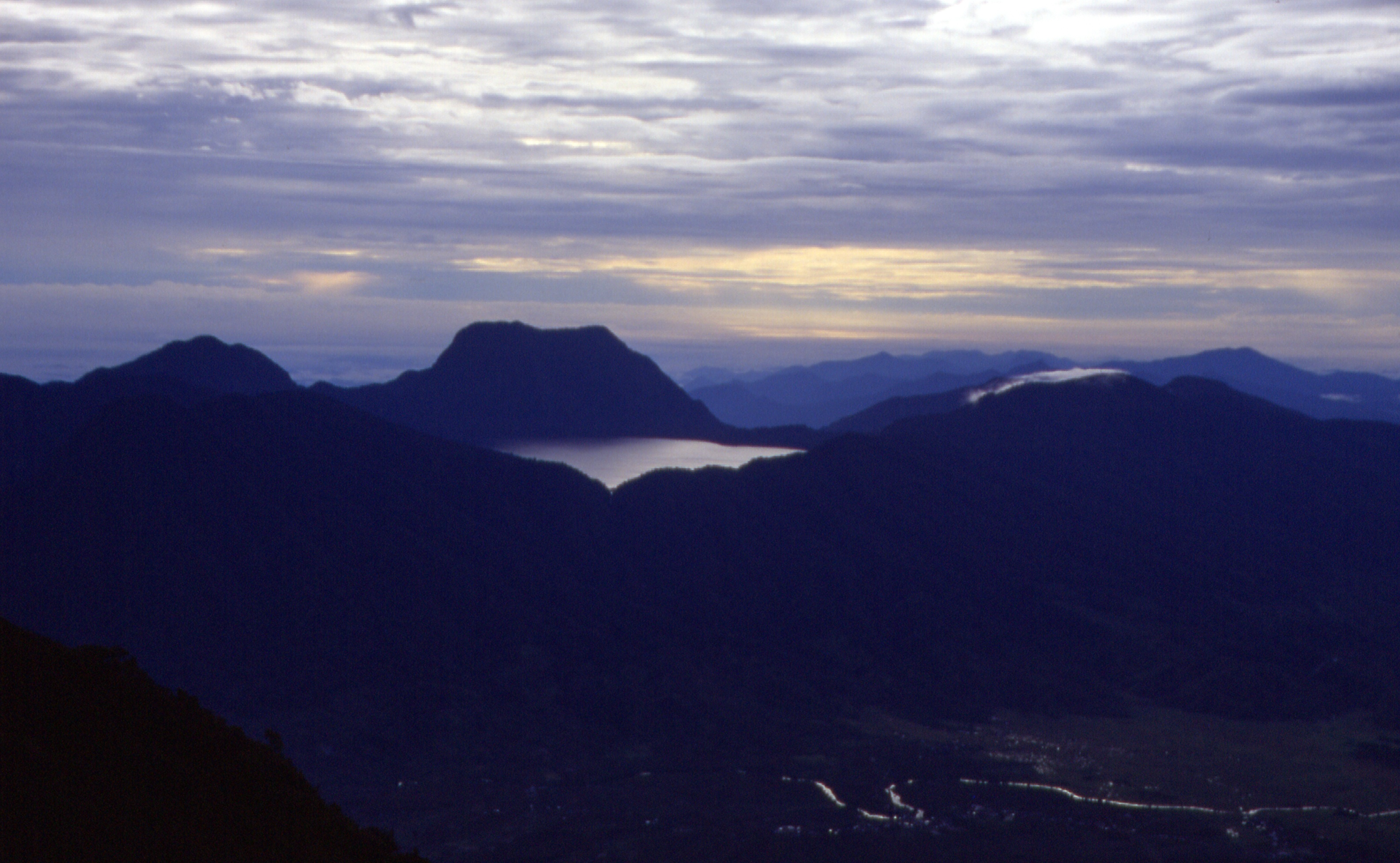
Mount Tujuh, Indonesia

No	Peak	Elevation (m)	Prominence (m)	Island (m)	Spesial
1	Masurai	2,933	1,789	Sumatra	
2	Raya	2,543	1,273	Sumatra	
3	Tujuh	2,732	1,250	Sumatra	
4	Sumbing (Sumatra)	2,507	1,063	Sumatra	

== Ribus and spesials in West Java ==
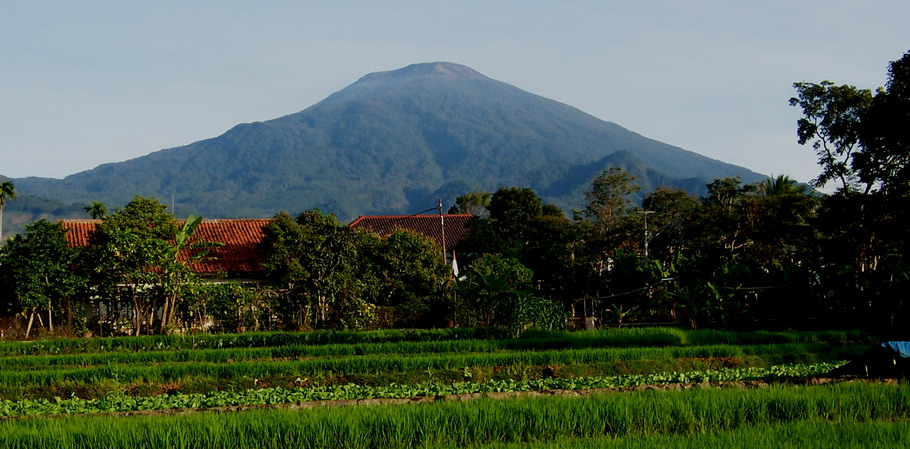
Mount Ciremai, Indonesia

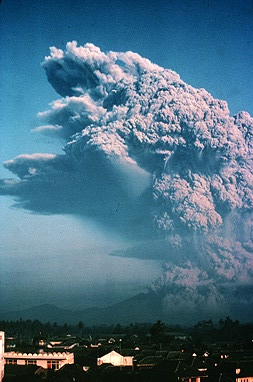
Mount Galunggung, Indonesia

No	Peak	Elevation (m)	Prominence (m)	Island (m)	Spesial
1	Ciremai	3,078	2,792	Java	
2	Pangrango	3,019	2,426	Java	
3	Cikuray	2,821	2,105	Java	
4	Salak	2,211	1,679	Java	
5	Bukittunggul	2,209	1,345	Java	
6	Papandayan (Malang)	2,675	1,329	Java	
7	Galunggung (Beuticanar)	2,240	1,262	Java	
8	Tampomas	1,684	1,106	Java	
9	Sawal	1,764	1,041	Java	
10	Patuha	2,434	964	Java	Spesial
11	Sangga Buana	1,279	808	Java	Spesial
12	Guntur (Masigit)	2,249	758	Java	Spesial
13	Malabar (Puncak Besar)	2,343	714	Java	Spesial
14	Tangkuban Parahu	2,084	707	Java	Spesial
15	Bongkok	970	702	Java	Spesial
16	Parang	915	354	Java	Spesial

== Ribus and spesials in Jawa Tengah ==
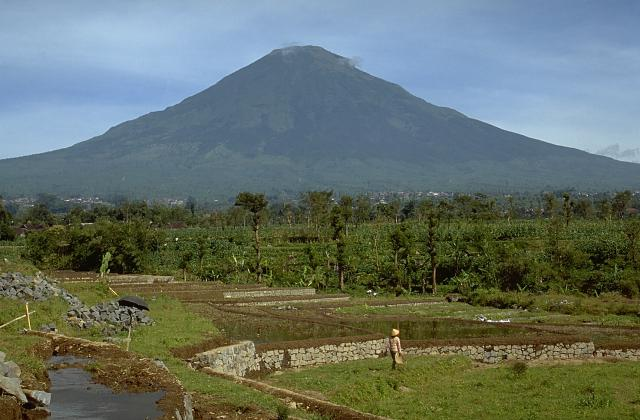
Mount Sindoro, Indonesia

No	Peak	Elevation (m)	Prominence (m)	Island (m)	Spesial
1	Mount Slamet	3,432	3,284	Java	
2	Sumbing	3,371	2,628	Java	
3	Merbabu	3,145	2,432	Java	
4	Sindoro	3,150	1,761	Java	
5	Muria	1,602	1,594	Java	
6	Merapi	2,968	1,394	Java	
7	Ungaran	2,050	1,320	Java	
8	Dieng (Prau)	2,600	938	Java	Spesial
9	Telomoyo	1,894	617	Java	Spesial

== Ribus and spesials in Jawa Timur ==
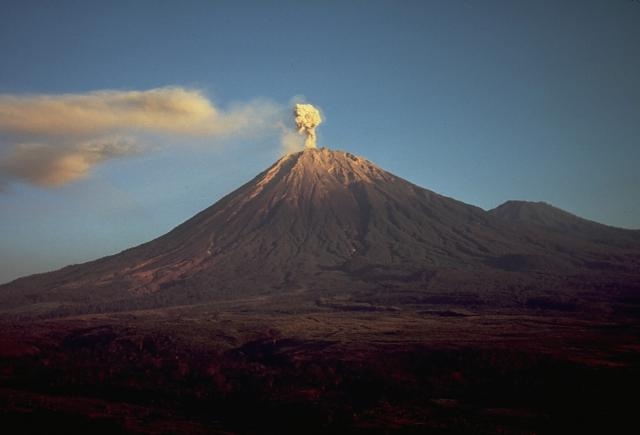
Mount Semeru, Indonesia

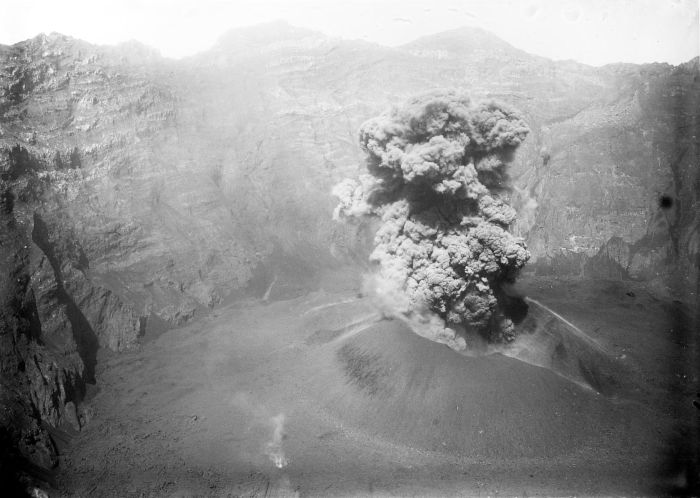
Mount Raung, Indonesia

No	Peak	Elevation (m)	Prominence (m)	Island (m)	Spesial
1	Semeru	3,676	3,676	Java	
2	Lawu	3,265	3,118	Java	
3	Raung	3,332	3,069	Java	
4	Arjuno	3,339	2,811	Java	
5	Argopuro	3,088	2,745	Java	
6	Liman	2,563	2,130	Java	
7	Butak	2,868	1,673	Java	
8	Ijen (Merapi)	2,803	1,218	Java	
9	Lamongan (Tarub)	1,667	1,108	Java	
10	Baluran	1,265	1,022	Java	
11	Penanggungan	1,653	1,020	Java	
12	Kelud	1,724	938	Java	Spesial
13	Bromo (Pananjakan)	2,782	586	Java	Spesial
14	Pulau Bawean	655	655	Bawean	

== Ribus and spesials in Kalimantan Barat ==
No	Peak	Elevation (m)	Prominence (m)	Island (m)	Spesial
1	Nyiut	1,701	1,658	Borneo	
2	Saran	1,758	1,575	Borneo	
3	Berumput	1,590	1,559	Borneo	
4	Beturan	1,577	1,369	Borneo	
5	Bawang	1,438	1,330	Borneo	
6	Berangin	1,652	1,323	Borneo	
7	Merdai	1,410	1,252	Borneo	
8	Rangga	1,495	1,207	Borneo	
9	Batutenobong	1,594	1,205	Borneo	
10	Biwa	1,290	1,170	Borneo	
11	Sebayan	1,368	1,166	Borneo	
12	Kerihun	2,005	1,140	Borneo	
13	Ngaras	1,185	1,121	Borneo	
14	Lawit	1,770	1,118	Borneo	
15	Palung (Ponti)	1,151	1,115	Borneo	
16	Melatai	1,923	1,104	Borneo	
17	Batuensambang	1,744	1,072	Borneo	
18	Cabang	1,006	1,006	Karimata	
19	Batu Daya	499	451	Borneo	Spesial

== Ribus and spesials in Kalimantan Selatan ==
No	Peak	Elevation (m)	Prominence (m)	Island (m)	Spesial
1	Besar	1,892	1,792	Borneo	
2	Kahung	1,246	1,015	Borneo	

== Ribus and spesials in Kalimantan Tengah ==
No	Peak	Elevation (m)	Prominence (m)	Island (m)	Spesial
1	Bukit Raya	2,300	2,017	Borneo	
2	Central Kalimantan Peak 1906	1,906	1,426	Borneo	
3	Central Kalimantan Peak 1578	1,578	1,280	Borneo	
4	Bukit Baka	1,529	1,209	Borneo	
5	Central Kalimantan Peak 1720	1,720	982	Borneo	Spesial

== Ribus and spesials in Kalimantan Timur ==
No	Peak	Elevation (m)	Prominence (m)	Island (m)	Spesial
1	Batu Jumak	2,250	1,575	Borneo	
2	Belayan	2,195	1,408	Borneo	
3	East Kalimantan Peak 2219	2,219	1,368	Borneo	
4	Liangpran	2,240	1,366	Borneo	
5	East Kalimantan Peak 2024	2,024	1,295	Borneo	
6	East Kalimantan Peak 1890	1,890	1,202	Borneo	
7	Beriun	1,297	1,193	Borneo	
8	East Kalimantan Peak 2064	2,064	1,135	Borneo	
9	Batu Tiban	2,050	1,131	Borneo	
10	East Kalimantan Peak 1964	1,964	1,104	Borneo	
11	East Kalimantan Peak 1476	1,476	1,099	Borneo	
12	Nyapa	1,290	1,081	Borneo	
13	Harun	2,169	1,076	Borneo	
14	Lumut	1,236	1,059	Borneo	
15	Nyaan	1,660	1,053	Borneo	
16	Batuayau	1,642	1,037	Borneo	
17	Beratus	1,244	1,028	Borneo	
18	Buringayok	1,202	987	Borneo	Spesial
19	Apad Runan	2,099	973	Borneo	Spesial

== Ribus and spesials in Riau Islands ==
No	Peak	Elevation (m)	Prominence (m)	Island (m)	Spesial
1	Daik	1,165	1,165	Lingga	
2	Jantan	439	439	Karimun	Spesial

== Ribus and spesials in Lampung ==
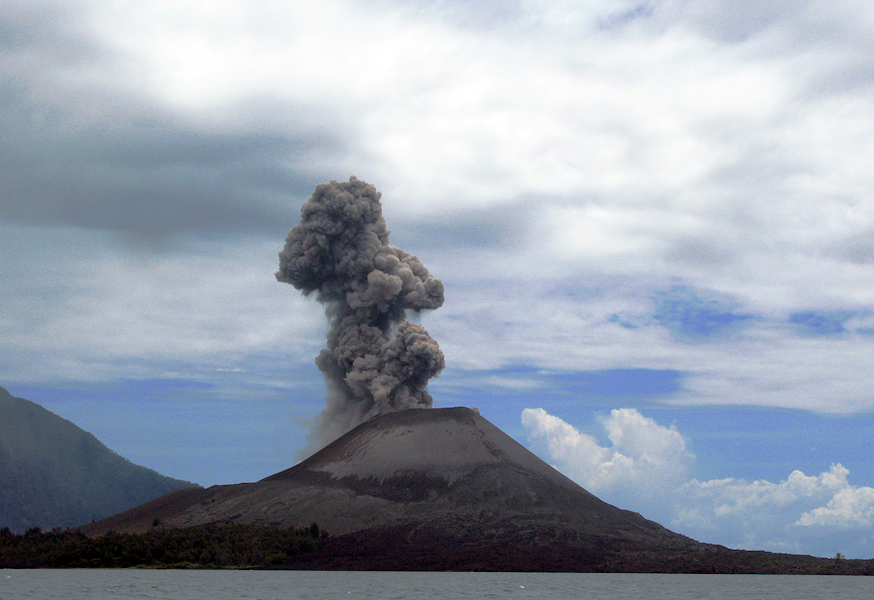
Anak Krakatau, Indonesia

No	Peak	Elevation (m)	Prominence (m)	Island (m)	Spesial
1	Tanggamus	2,102	1,382	Sumatra	
2	Pesagi	2,219	1,362	Sumatra	
3	Pesawaran (Ratai)	1,682	1,265	Sumatra	
4	Rajabasa	1,281	1,259	Sumatra	
5	Tebak	2,115	1,150	Sumatra	
6	Sebesi	844	844	Sebesi	Spesial
7	Rakata	813	813	Rakata	Spesial
8	Anak Krakatau	288	288	Anak Krakatau	Spesial

== Ribus and spesials in Maluku ==
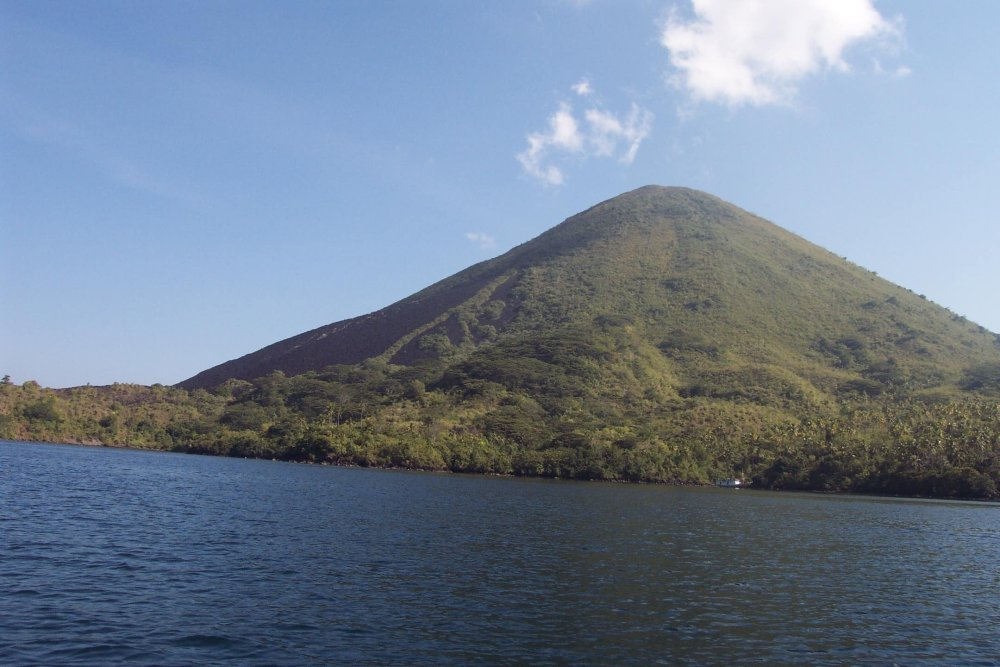
Banda Api, Indonesia

No	Peak	Elevation (m)	Prominence (m)	Island (m)	Spesial
1	Binaiya	3,027	3,027	Seram	
2	Kapalatmada	2,700	2,700	Buru	
3	Lalaitu	1,411	1,411	Wetar	
4	Batakbual	1,750	1,127	Buru	
5	Toplana (Totaniwel)	1,329	1,029	Seram	
6	Salahutu	1,023	1,023	Ambon	
7	Gecilia (SolitaBatu)	1,473	1,002	Seram	
8	Sahuai	1,050	959	Seram	Spesial
9	Banda Api	640	640	Banda Api	Spesial

== Ribus and spesials in North Maluku ==
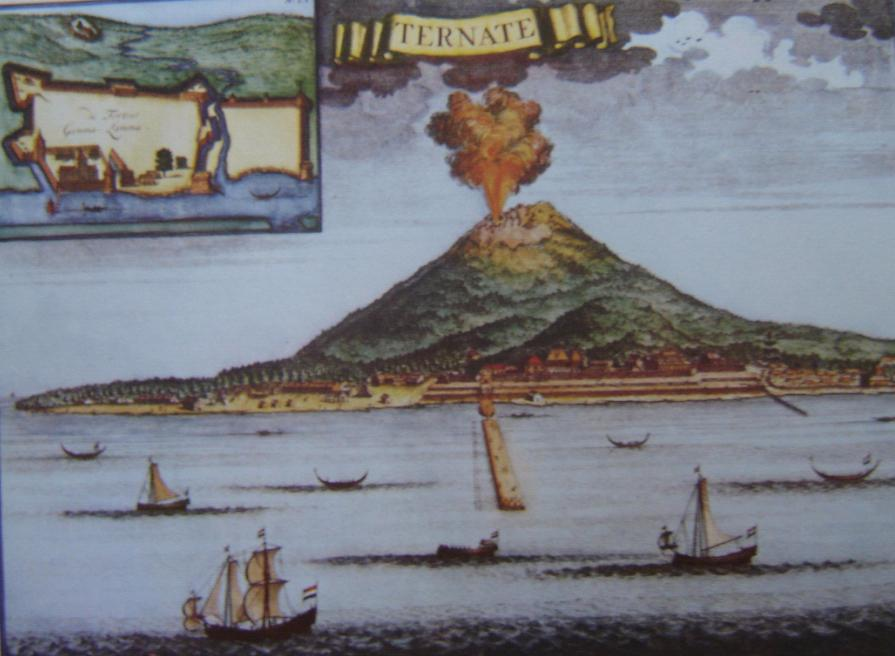
Gamalama, Indonesia

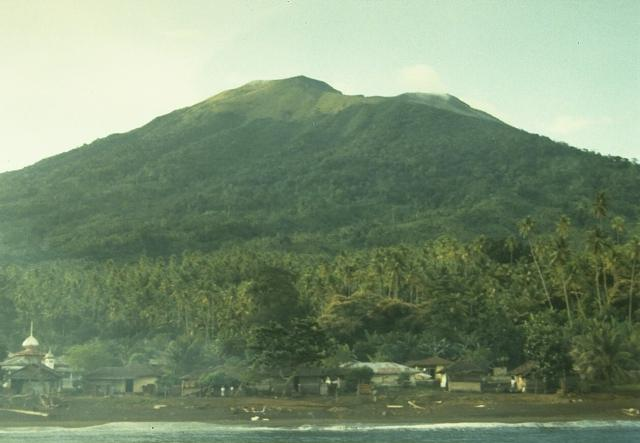
Gamkonora, Indonesia

No	Peak	Elevation (m)	Prominence (m)	Island (m)	Spesial
1	Buku Sibela	2,111	2,111	Bacan	
2	Kiematubu	1,750	1,750	Tidore	
3	Gamalama	1,715	1,715	Ternate	
4	Pulau Obi	1,611	1,611	Obi	
5	Gamkonora	1,560	1,560	Halmahera	
6	Pulau Taliabu (Lida Godo)	1,415	1,415	Taliabu	
7	Watowato	1,442	1,397	Halmahera	
8	Kie Besi (Mailoa)	1,357	1,357	Makian	
9	Sabatai	1,250	1,250	Morotai	
10	Loku	1,127	1,127	Mangoli	
11	Buku Rica	1,127	1,104	Bacan	
12	Ibu	1,377	1,090	Halmahera	
13	Rogirogi	1,220	1,062	Halmahera	
14	Jailolo	1,010	985	Halmahera	Spesial
15	Dukono	1,259	356	Halmahera	Spesial

== Ribus and spesials in Nanggroe Aceh Darussalam ==
No	Peak	Elevation (m)	Prominence (m)	Island (m)	Spesial
1	Leuser	3,466	2,940	Sumatra	
2	Bukit Mugajah	3,079	1,805	Sumatra	
3	Hulumasen	2,310	1,717	Sumatra	
4	Bandahara	3,012	1,642	Sumatra	
5	Seulawah Agam	1,810	1,610	Sumatra	
6	Geureudong	2,885	1,551	Sumatra	
7	Peuet Sague	2,801	1,492	Sumatra	
8	Abong Abong	2,985	1,104	Sumatra	
9	Burniklieuteun	2,635	1,093	Sumatra	
10	Sembuang	2,028	954	Sumatra	Spesial
11	Kemiri	3,317	851	Sumatra	Spesial
12	Pulau Weh (Cot Kulam)	648	648	Weh	Spesial

== Ribus and spesials in Nusa Tenggara Barat ==
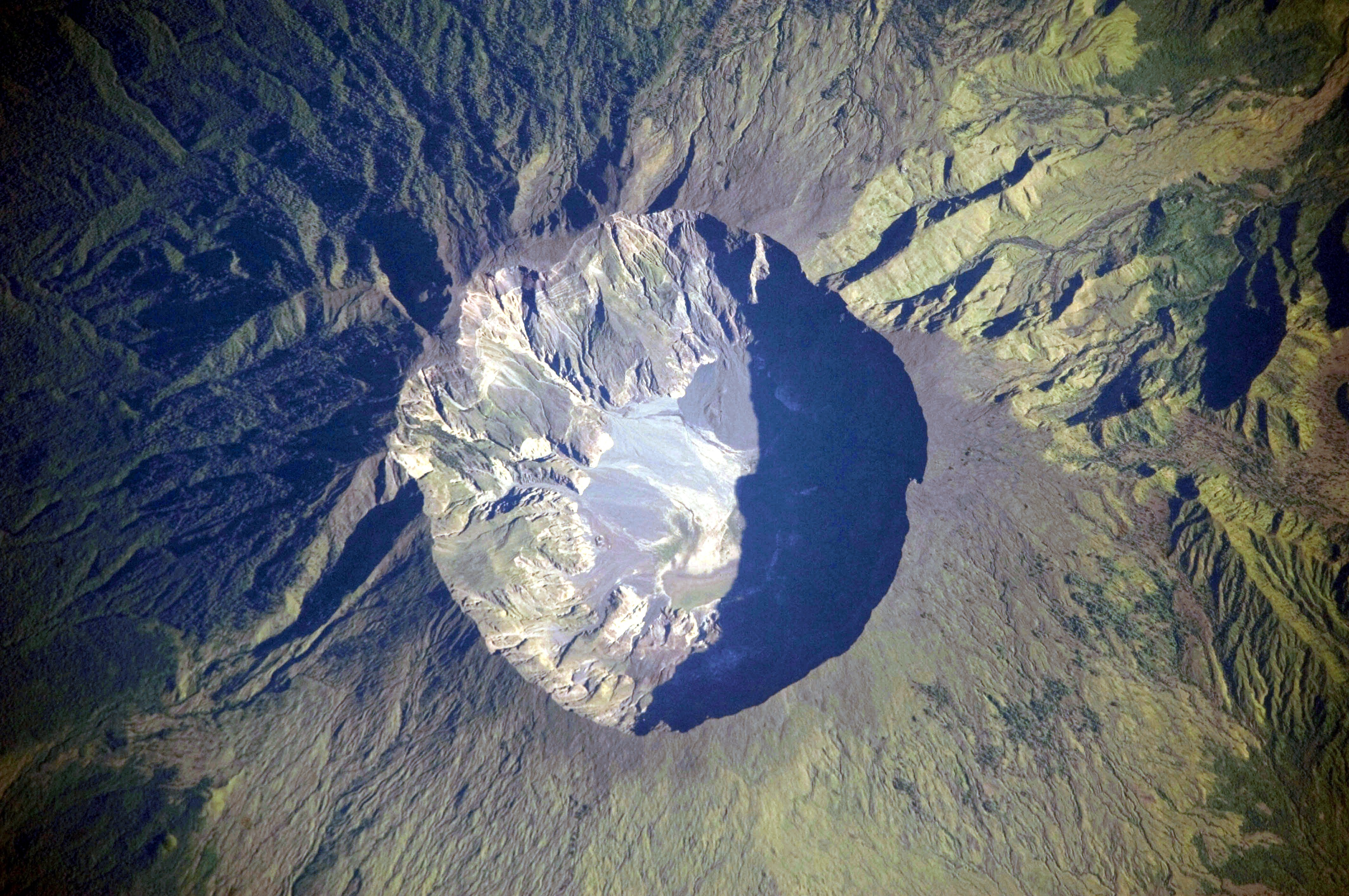
Mount Tambora, Indonesia

No	Peak	Elevation (m)	Prominence (m)	Island (m)	Spesial
1	Rinjani	3,726	3,726	Lombok	
2	Tambora	2,722	2,722	Sumbawa	
3	Sangeang	1,949	1,949	Sangeang	
4	Olet Sangenges	1,840	1,773	Sumbawa	
5	Doro Oromboha	1,605	1,491	Sumbawa	
6	Doro Maria	1,444	1,306	Sumbawa	
7	Olet Takan	1,343	999	Sumbawa	Spesial

== Ribus and spesials in East Nusa Tenggara ==
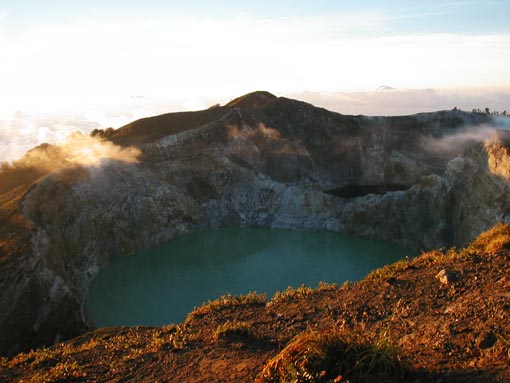
Kelimutu, Indonesia

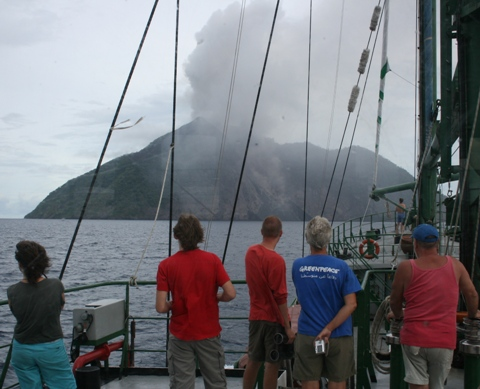
Batu Tara, Indonesia

No	Peak	Elevation (m)	Prominence (m)	Island (m)	Spesial
1	Poco Ngandonalu	2,367	2,367	Flores	
2	Mutis	2,417	1,970	Timor	
3	Dola Koyakoya	1,821	1,821	Alor	
4	Ili Boleng	1,658	1,658	Adonara	
5	Inerie	2,227	1,625	Flores	
6	Ili Labalekang	1,621	1,621	Lembata	
7	Lewotolo	1,449	1,415	Lembata	
8	Egon	1,708	1,405	Flores	
9	Ili Mandiri	1,484	1,401	Flores	
10	Lewotobi	1,703	1,400	Flores	
11	Sirung (Sopak)	1,336	1,336	Pantar	
12	Ebolobo	2,137	1,316	Flores	
13	Keli Lepembusu	1,754	1,250	Flores	
14	Ili Ujolewung	1,523	1,246	Lembata	
15	Wanggameti	1,225	1,225	Sumba	
16	Fatu Timau	1,762	1,131	Timor	
17	Curunumbeng	1,988	1,061	Flores	
18	Ili Wukoh	1,431	1,046	Flores	
19	Pura	991	991	Pura	Spesial
20	Pulau Besar	975	975	Besar	Spesial
21	Mbeliling	1,258	848	Flores	Spesial
22	Ara	824	824	Komodo	Spesial
23	Batu Tara	748	748	Komba	Spesial
24	Tuntuli	959	743	Pantar	Spesial
25	Doro Ora	735	735	Rinca	Spesial
26	Iya	637	591	Flores	Spesial
27	Poco Ranakah	2,292	581	Flores	Spesial
28	Kelimutu (Inspiration Point)	1,647	48	Flores	Spesial
29	Lakaan	1,600	1,600	Timor	Spesial

== Ribus and spesials in Papua ==
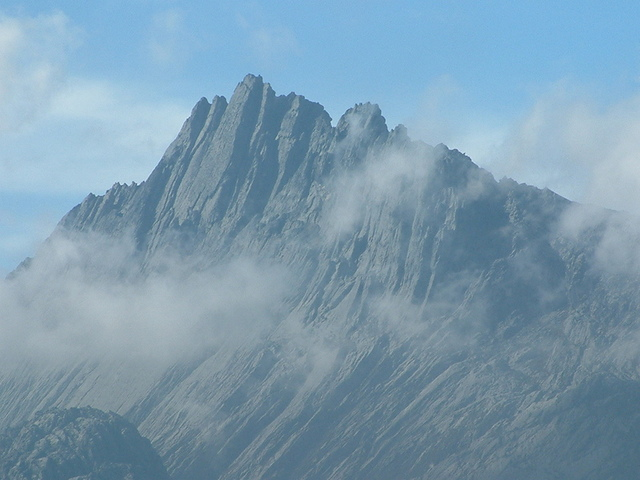
Puncak Jaya, Indonesia

No	Peak	Elevation (m)	Prominence (m)	Island (m)	Spesial
1	Carstensz Pyramid, Puncak Jaya	4,884	4,884	New Guinea	
2	Puncak Mandala	4,760	2,758	New Guinea	
3	Kobowre (Wakai)	3,750	2,215	New Guinea	
4	Gauttier	2,230	2,007	New Guinea	
5	Cyclops	2,000	1,859	New Guinea	
6	Undundi-Wandandi	3,640	1,732	New Guinea	
7	Angemuk	3,949	1,565	New Guinea	
8	Deyjay	3,340	1,523	New Guinea	
9	Pulau Yapen	1,496	1,496	Yapen	
10	Pegunungan Q	1,769	1,384	New Guinea	
11	Jumbul Ambera	3,785	1,383	New Guinea	
12	Papua Peak 1566	1,566	1,369	New Guinea	
13	Z Chain	3,773	1,354	New Guinea	
14	Papua Peak 4061	4,061	1,327	New Guinea	
15	Papua Peak 2884	2,884	1,272	New Guinea	
16	Puncak Trikora	4,750	1,268	New Guinea	
17	Y Chain	3,285	1,227	New Guinea	
18	Bukit Buru	1,322	1,207	New Guinea	
19	Mamaipiri	3,047	1,181	New Guinea	
20	Papua Peak 3856	3,856	1,165	New Guinea	
21	X Chain	3,801	1,133	New Guinea	
22	Yaramaniapuka	3,251	1,112	New Guinea	
23	Jimliek	3,151	1,107	New Guinea	
24	Legare	1,332	1,010	New Guinea	
25	Bonsupiori	995	995	Supiori	Spesial
26	Valentiyn	4,453	807	New Guinea	Spesial

== Ribus and spesials in West Papua ==
No	Peak	Elevation (m)	Prominence (m)	Island (m)	Spesial
1	Arfak (Umsini)	2,955	2,775	New Guinea	
2	Wondiwoi	2,187	1,994	New Guinea	
3	Irau	2,500	1,900	New Guinea	
4	Kumawa	1,680	1,636	New Guinea	
5	Fak Fak Mountains	1,490	1,434	New Guinea	
6	Fudi (Gnowo)	1,663	1,326	New Guinea	
7	Tohkier	2,461	1,217	New Guinea	
8	Batanta (Kalalikut)	1,184	1,184	Batanta	
9	Niefeb	2,726	1,106	New Guinea	
10	Mandum	977	977	Weigeo	Spesial

== Spesials in Sabah ==
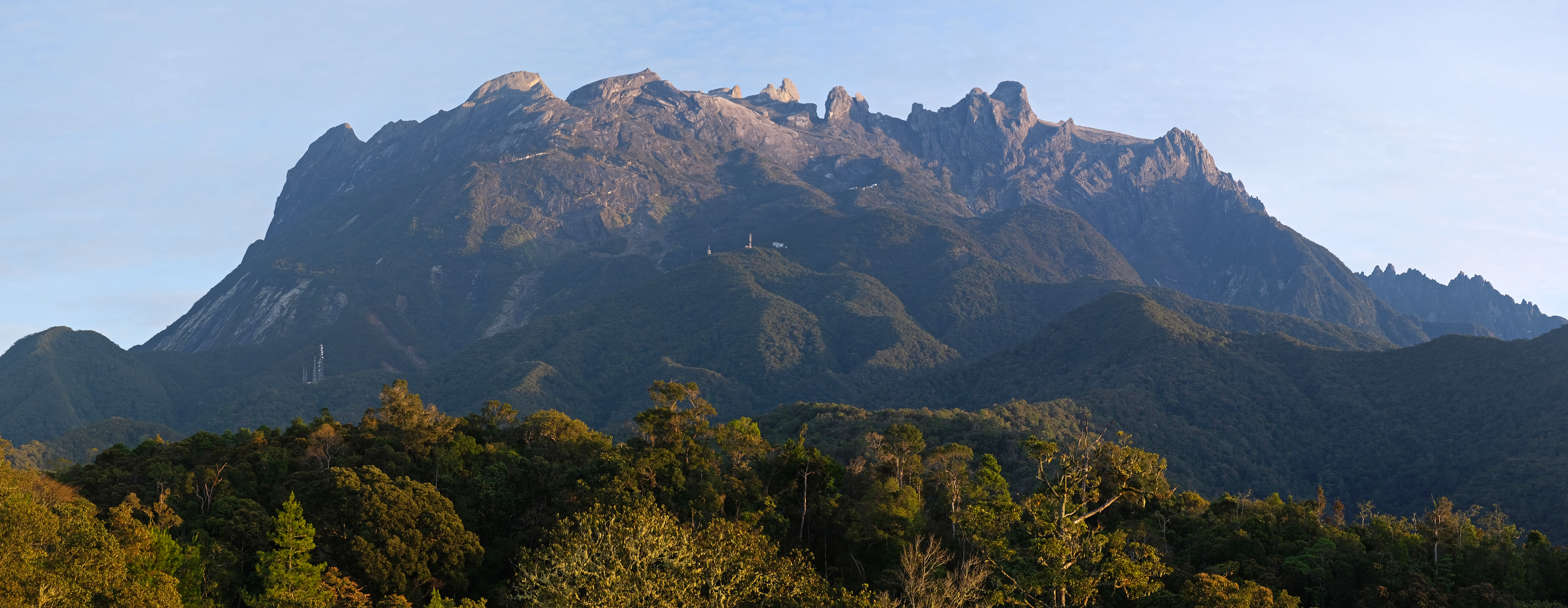
Mount Kinabalu, Malaysia

No	Peak	Elevation (m)	Prominence (m)	Island (m)	Spesial
1	Kinabalu	4,095	4,095	Borneo	Spesial
2	Trusmadi	2,643	1,702	Borneo	Spesial

== Spesials in Sarawak ==
No	Peak	Elevation (m)	Prominence (m)	Island (m)	Spesial
1	Mulu	2,376	2,025	Borneo	Spesial
2	Murud	2,426	1,967	Borneo	Spesial
3	Bukit Batu	2,040	1,574	Borneo	Spesial

== Ribus and spesials in Sulawesi Barat ==
No	Peak	Elevation (m)	Prominence (m)	Island (m)	Spesial
1	Gandadiwata	3,074	2,140	Sulawesi	
2	Tinangko	2,736	1,216	Sulawesi	

== Ribus and spesials in Sulawesi Selatan ==
No	Peak	Elevation (m)	Prominence (m)	Island (m)	Spesial
1	Rantemario	3,478	3,478	Sulawesi	
2	Moncong Lompobatang	2,874	2,856	Sulawesi	
3	Balease	3,016	1,587	Sulawesi	
4	Tonggongkarambu	1,705	1,254	Sulawesi	
5	Kambuno (Lantangunta)	2,855	1,199	Sulawesi	
6	Ambesu	1,957	996	Sulawesi	Spesial
7	Buntu Puang	1,925	852	Sulawesi	Spesial

== Ribus and spesials in Sulawesi Tengah ==
No	Peak	Elevation (m)	Prominence (m)	Island (m)	Spesial
1	Sojol	3,030	2,713	Sulawesi	
2	Kandela	2,870	2,250	Sulawesi	
3	Tumpu	2,565	2,054	Sulawesi	
4	Pompangeo	2,590	1,883	Sulawesi	
5	Dako	2,260	1,801	Sulawesi	
6	Buyu Lumut	2,403	1,756	Sulawesi	
7	Torompupu	2,495	1,681	Sulawesi	
8	Malino	2,410	1,476	Sulawesi	
9	Tokala	2,584	1,384	Sulawesi	
10	Tompotika	1,550	1,329	Sulawesi	
11	Batui	1,930	1,199	Sulawesi	
12	Masamba	1,808	1,180	Sulawesi	
13	Tombia	1,022	1,022	Peleng	
14	Sidole	1,803	1,013	Sulawesi	
15	Bulu Nti	2,334	1,012	Sulawesi	

== Ribus and spesials in Sulawesi Tenggara ==
No	Peak	Elevation (m)	Prominence (m)	Island (m)	Spesial
1	Mekongga	2,650	2,221	Sulawesi	
2	Sambapolulu	1,570	1,570	Kabaena	
3	Osu Nondoto	2,421	1,235	Sulawesi	
4	Kabawo Lambohogo	1,069	1,069	Butung	
5	Libukang	2,242	1,026	Sulawesi	
6	Wawo Lantambaga	909	909	Wowoni	Spesial

== Ribus and spesials in Sulawesi Utara ==
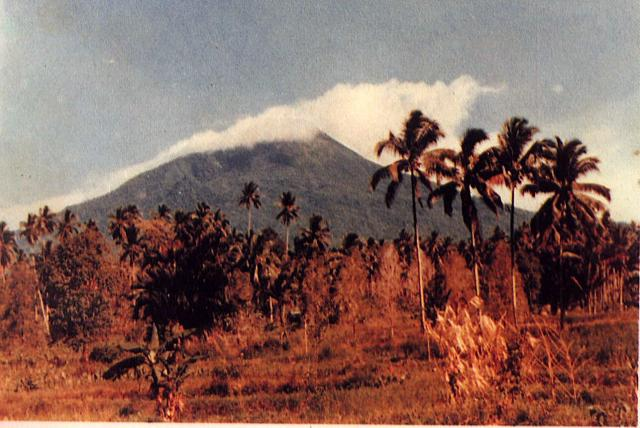
Mount Klabat, Indonesia

No	Peak	Elevation (m)	Prominence (m)	Island (m)	Spesial
1	Klabat	1,995	1,852	Sulawesi	
2	Karangetang	1,827	1,827	Siau	
3	Matabulawa	1,964	1,756	Sulawesi	
4	Soputan	1,803	1,419	Sulawesi	
5	Ambang	1,795	1,397	Sulawesi	
6	Awu	1,340	1,340	Great Sangihe	
7	Lokon	1,580	842	Sulawesi	Spesial
8	Manado Tua	805	805	Manado Tua	Spesial
9	Bukiri Kalongan	786	786	Thulandang	Spesial
10	Ruang	725	725	Ruang	Spesial

== Ribus and spesials in West Sumatera ==
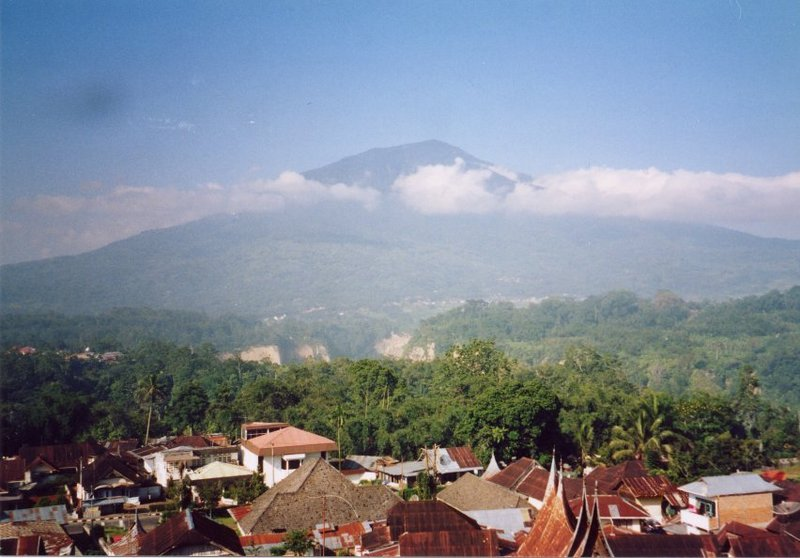
Mount Singgalang, Indonesia

No	Peak	Elevation (m)	Prominence (m)	Island (m)	Spesial
1	Kerinci	3,805	3,805	Sumatra	
2	Talakmau	2,919	2,329	Sumatra	
3	Marapi	2,891	2,116	Sumatra	
4	Singgalang	2,877	1,723	Sumatra	
5	Malea	2,199	1,422	Sumatra	
6	Malintang (Sago)	2,271	1,388	Sumatra	
7	Hijau	2,272	1,368	Sumatra	
8	Pantaicermin	2,690	1,218	Sumatra	
9	Talang	2,597	1,047	Sumatra	

== Ribus and spesials in South Sumatera ==
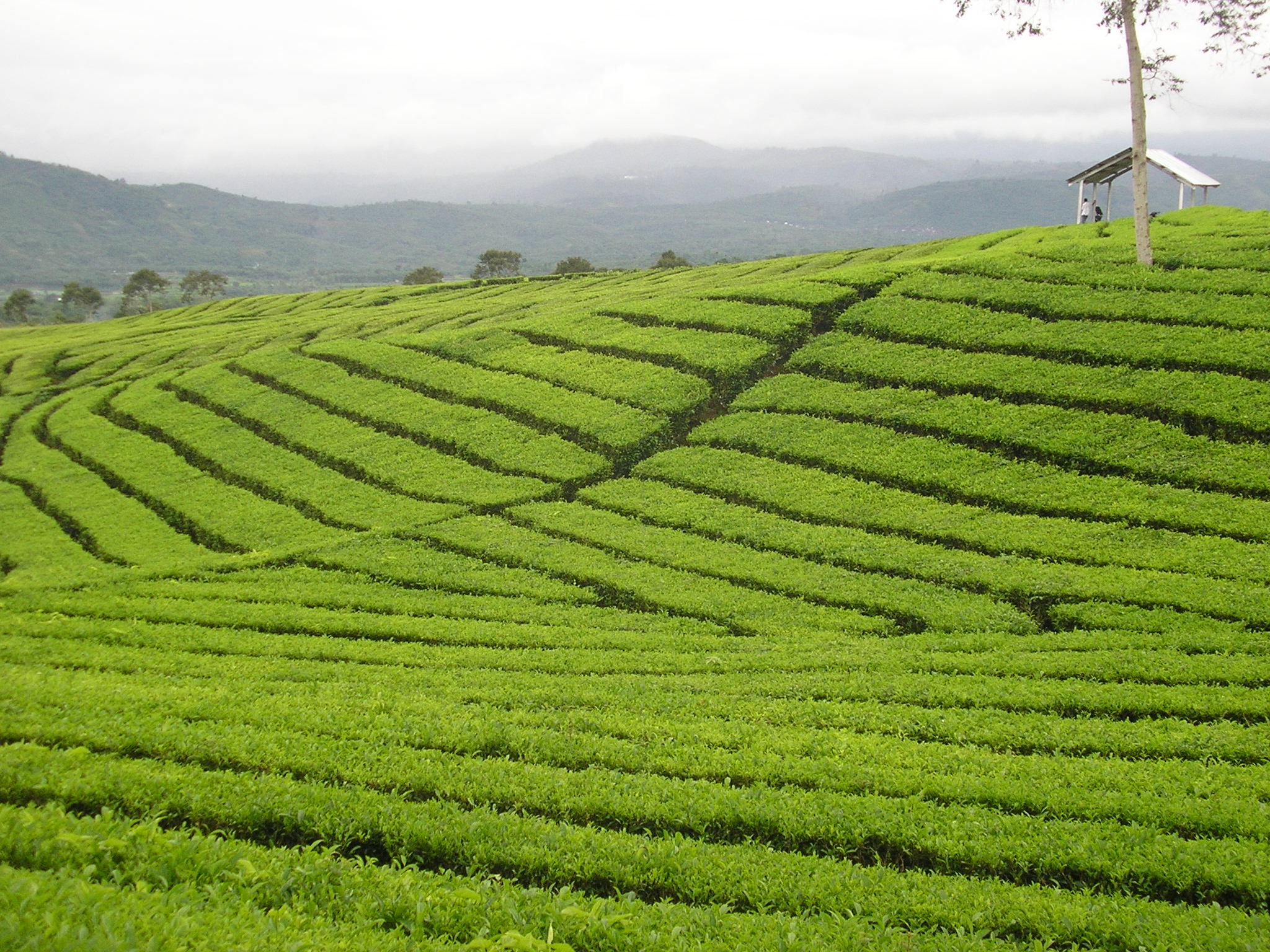
Mount Dempo, Indonesia

No	Peak	Elevation (m)	Prominence (m)	Island (m)	Spesial
1	Dempo	3,173	2,450	Sumatra	
2	Patah	2,850	1,635	Sumatra	
3	Gumai	1,786	1,047	Sumatra	
4	Pasu	2,078	983	Sumatra	Spesial

== Ribus and spesials in North Sumatera ==
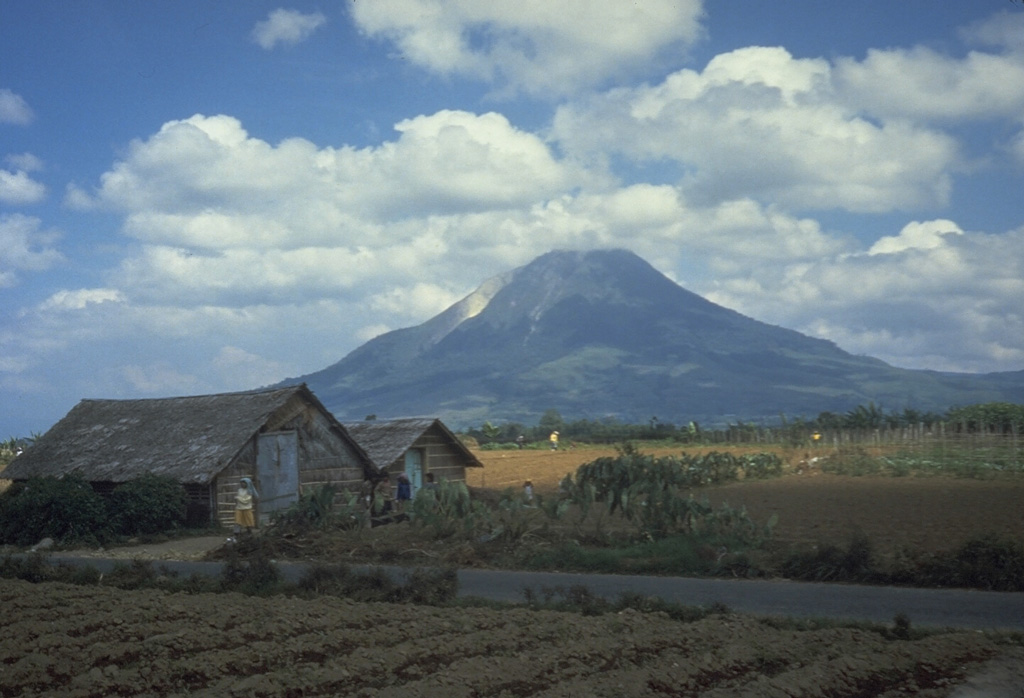
Mount Sinabung, Indonesia

No	Peak	Elevation (m)	Prominence (m)	Island (m)	Spesial
1	Sibuatan	2,457	1,800	Sumatra	
2	Sorikmarapi	2,145	1,368	Sumatra	
3	Sinabung	2,460	1,143	Sumatra	
4	Dolok Gongonan	1,440	1,051	Sumatra	
5	Pangulubao	2,199	1,015	Sumatra	
6	Samosir	1,713	806	Sumatra	Spesial
7	Sibayak	2,212	762	Sumatra	Spesial

== Spesials in Timor Leste ==
No	Peak	Elevation (m)	Prominence (m)	Island (m)	Spesial
1	Ramelau	2,963	2,963	Timor	Spesial
2	Matebeanfeto	2,372	2,045	Timor	Spesial

== See also ==
- List of peaks by prominence
- List of volcanoes in Indonesia
