= Sawaal =

Sawaal may refer to:

- Sawaal (film), a 1982 Indian Hindi-language drama film by Ramesh Talwar, starring Shashi Kapoor, Poonam Dhillon and Sanjeev Kumar
- Sawaal (album), a 2002 album by Aaroh

== See also ==
- Sawal, a village in Punjab, India
- Savaal (disambiguation)
