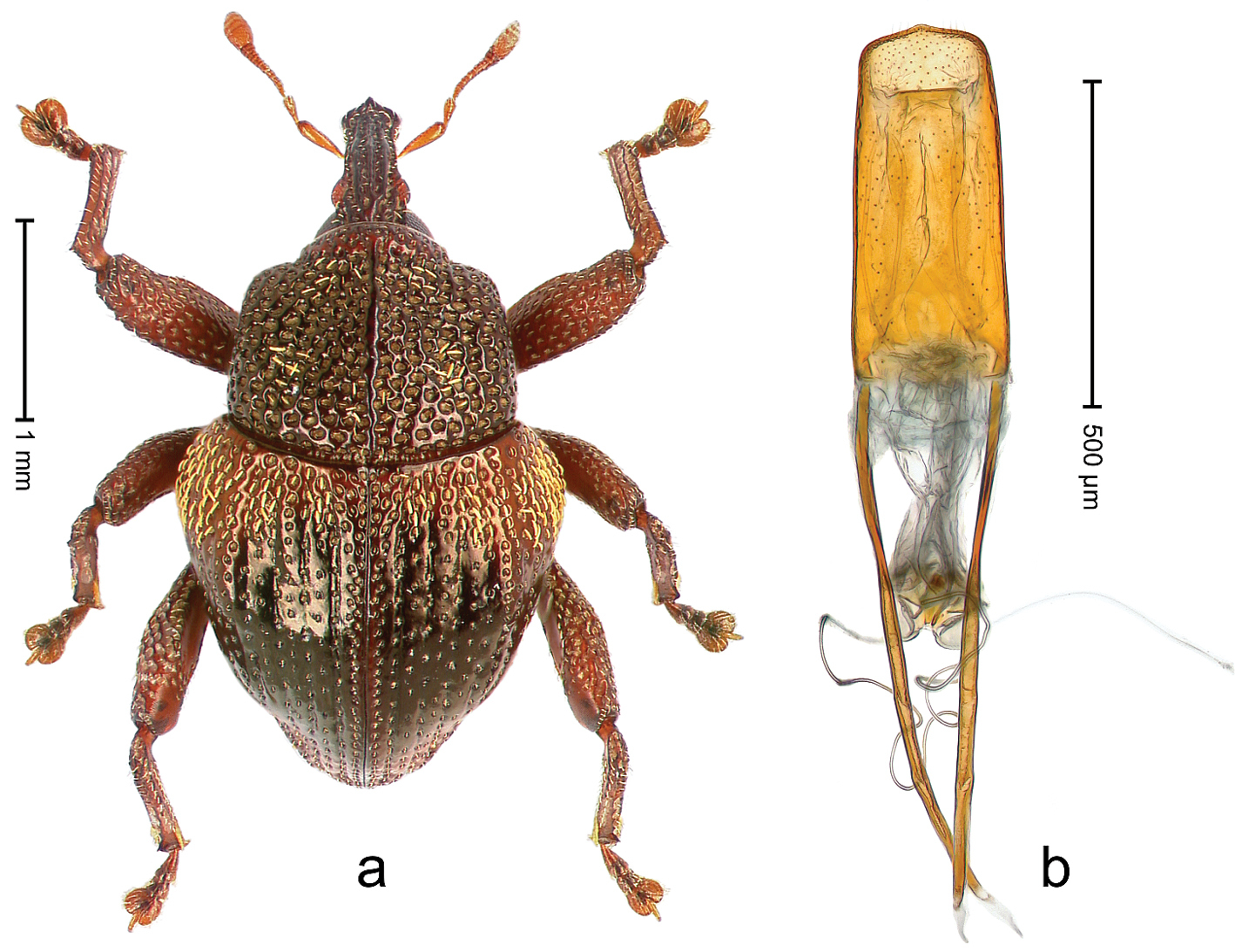

Scientific classification
- Kingdom: Animalia
- Phylum: Arthropoda
- Clade: Pancrustacea
- Class: Insecta
- Order: Coleoptera
- Suborder: Polyphaga
- Infraorder: Cucujiformia
- Family: Curculionidae
- Genus: Trigonopterus
- Species: T. dacrycarpi

Binomial name
- Trigonopterus dacrycarpi Riedel, 2014

= Trigonopterus dacrycarpi =

Species of beetle

Trigonopterus dacrycarpi is a species of flightless weevil in the genus Trigonopterus from Indonesia. The species was described in 2014 and is named after the conifer genus Dacrycarpus, as specimens of the weevil were usually found under trees of this genus. The beetle is 2.36–3.06 mm long. The body is mainly ferruginous, with the dorsal surface of the head and pronotum being dark ferruginous, and the center of the elytra being black with a bronze sheen. Endemic to the Lesser Sunda Islands, where it is known from the islands of Sumbawa and Flores at elevations of 1,270–1,730 m (4,170–5,680 ft).

== Taxonomy ==
Trigonopterus dacrycarpi was described by the entomologist Alexander Riedel in 2014 on the basis of an adult male specimen collected from Batu Dulang on the island of Sumbawa in Indonesia. The species is named after the conifer genus Dacrycarpus, as specimens of the weevil were usually found under trees of this genus.

T. dacrycarpi is part of the T. dimorphus species group. The two populations of the species (from Sumbawa and Flores) have a 7.5–9.7% p-distance difference, but no noticeable morphological differences.

== Description ==
The beetle is 2.36–3.06 mm long. The body is mainly ferruginous, with the dorsal surface of the head and pronotum being dark ferruginous, and the center of the elytra being black with a bronze sheen. In dorsal view, the body shows a pronounced constriction between the pronotum and elytra, and is dorsally convex in profile. The rostrum is coarsely punctate in the apical third, while the basal half features a median ridge and a pair of submedian ridges. The intervening furrows are punctate and contain sparse rows of suberect setae. The epistome has a posterior transverse, angular ridge that forms a distinct median denticle.

The pronotum has subparallel sides that abruptly round anteriorly into a subapical constriction. Its disc is coarsely punctate and reticulate, with each puncture containing an inconspicuous seta. Sublaterally, each side bears two sparse clusters of recumbent, elongate, cream-colored scales. A distinct median ridge is present. The elytra have swollen, laterally projecting humeri. Interval 5 is swollen and dorsally projecting in front of the middle, while interval 6 remains unmodified. The striae are indistinct, and the intervals are flat and punctate. The subbasal region is coarsely punctate and bears recumbent, yellowish, almond-shaped scales. The central area is less densely punctate, with minute setae in the punctures and polished interspaces. The anteroventral ridge of the femora is distinct, forming a large blunt tooth in the meso- and metafemora. The metafemur also has a subapical stridulatory patch. The dorsal edge of the tibiae shows a subbasal angulation. Abdominal ventrite 5 is flat and coarsely punctate, with rows of upcurved piliform scales at the base.

The penis has subparallel sides and a subangulate apex. The transfer apparatus is compact, and the apodemes are 1.8 times the length of the penis body. The ductus ejaculatorius lacks a bulbus.

The legs and elytral base may be ferruginous or dark ferruginous, nearly black. Females have a more slender body. The female rostrum is dorsally punctate-rugose, with a glabrous median ridge flanked by rows of punctures and a pair of sublateral furrows. The epistome is simple. Female elytra are subovate, lacking swellings, with a convex lateral contour and simple humeri. The basal scales are indistinct.

== Distribution and habitat ==
Trigonopterus dacrycarpi is endemic to the Lesser Sunda Islands in Indonesia, where it is found near Batu Dulang and Tepal on the island of Sumbawa and around Mount Ranaka and Lake Ranamese on the island of Flores. It has been recorded at elevations of 1,270–1,730 m (4,170–5,680 ft). The species is usually found under trees of the conifer genus Dacrycarpus, which it feeds on. It may also feed on other plants that grow in proximity to Dacrycarpus.
