= Savaale Samali (disambiguation) =

Savaale Samali is a 1971 Indian Tamil-language film.

Savaale Samali or Savaale Samaali may also refer to:

- Savaale Samali (TV series), a 2017–2018 Tamil game show
- Savaale Samaali, a 2015 Indian Tamil language film

== See also ==
- Savaal (disambiguation)
