= Savaal (disambiguation) =

Savaal is a 1981 Tamil film.

Savaal may also refer to:

- Savaal (2014 film), a 2014 Kannada film

== See also ==
- Sawaal (disambiguation)
- Savaale Samali (disambiguation)
