= Poco Mandasawu =

Mountain in Flores Island, Indonesia

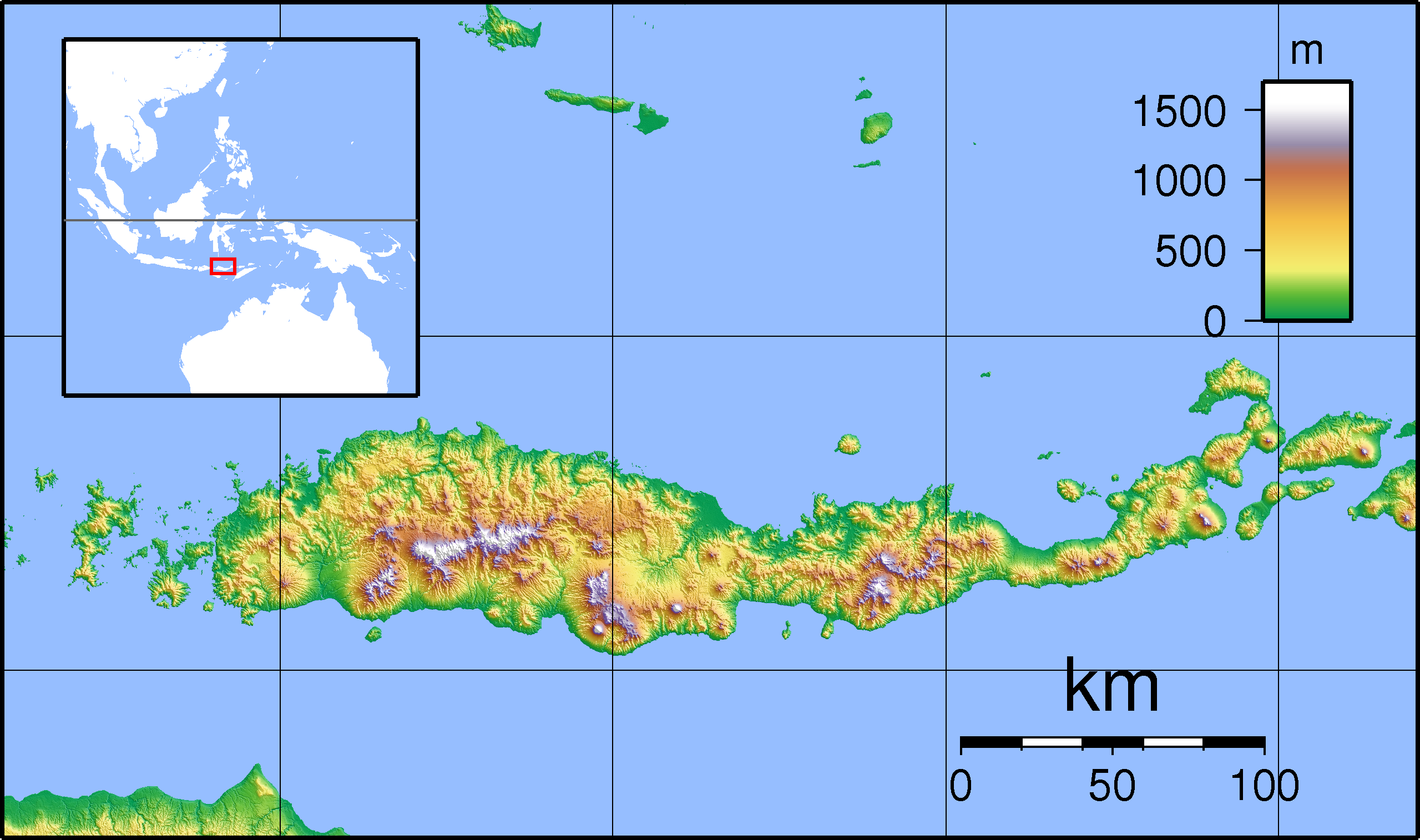
- Location within Flores

Highest point
- Elevation: 2,370 m (7,780 ft)
- Prominence: 2,370 m (7,780 ft)
- Listing: Ultra; Ribu
- Coordinates: 8°39′06″S 120°26′54″E

Geography
- Location: Flores Island, Indonesia

Poco Mandasawu is a lava dome of Ranakah located in the south-central part of the island of Flores, Indonesia. It is the highest point of the island.

== See also ==
- List of ultras of the Malay Archipelago

== Sources ==
- Peakbagger
- Ranakah, Synonyms and subfeatures
