= Kelimutu =

Volcano on the island of Flores in Indonesia

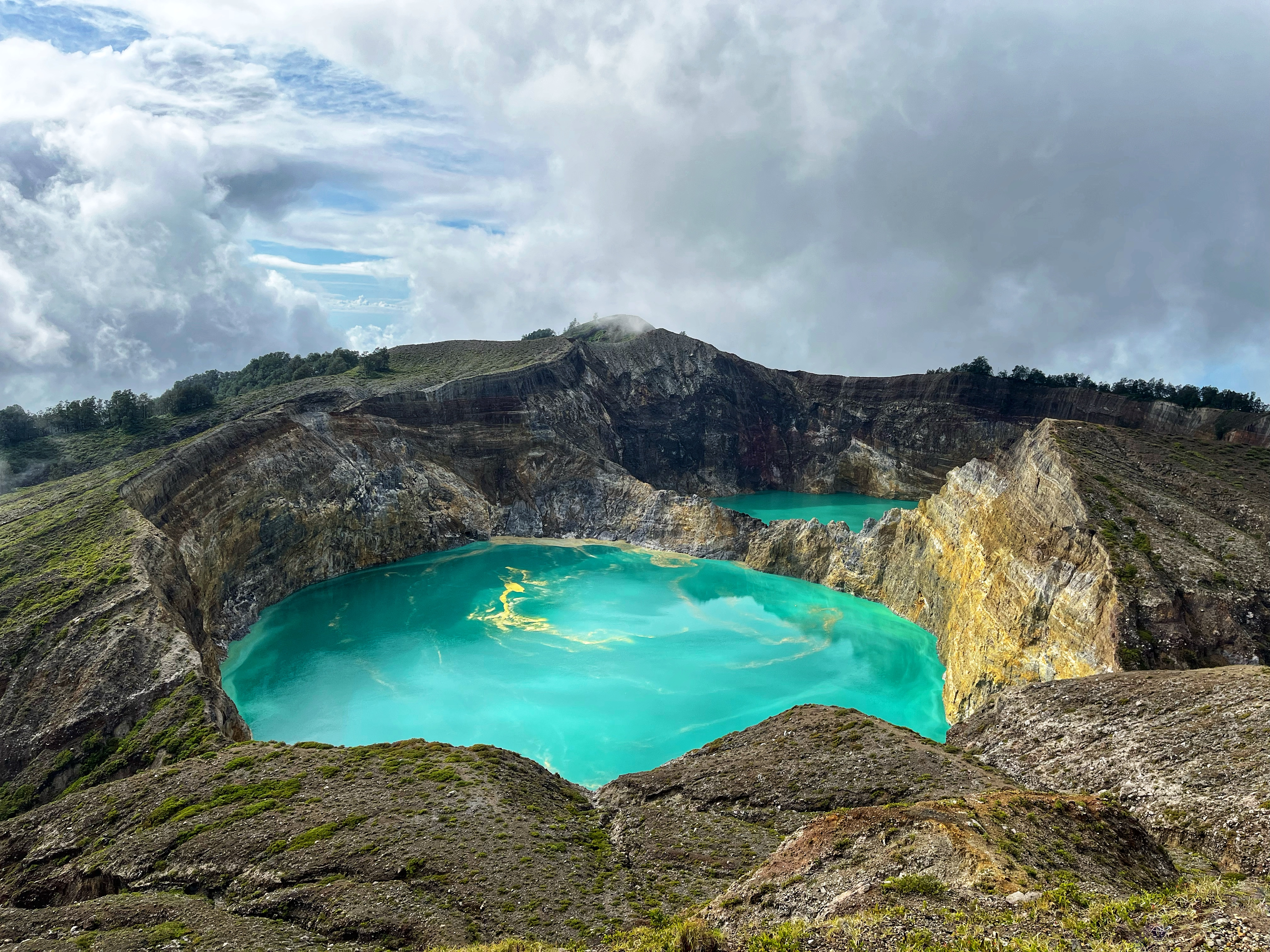
- Crater lake at Kelimutus summit

Highest point
- Elevation: 1,639 m (5,377 ft)
- Listing: List of volcanoes in Indonesia; Spesial Ribu
- Coordinates: 8°46′S 121°49′E

Geography
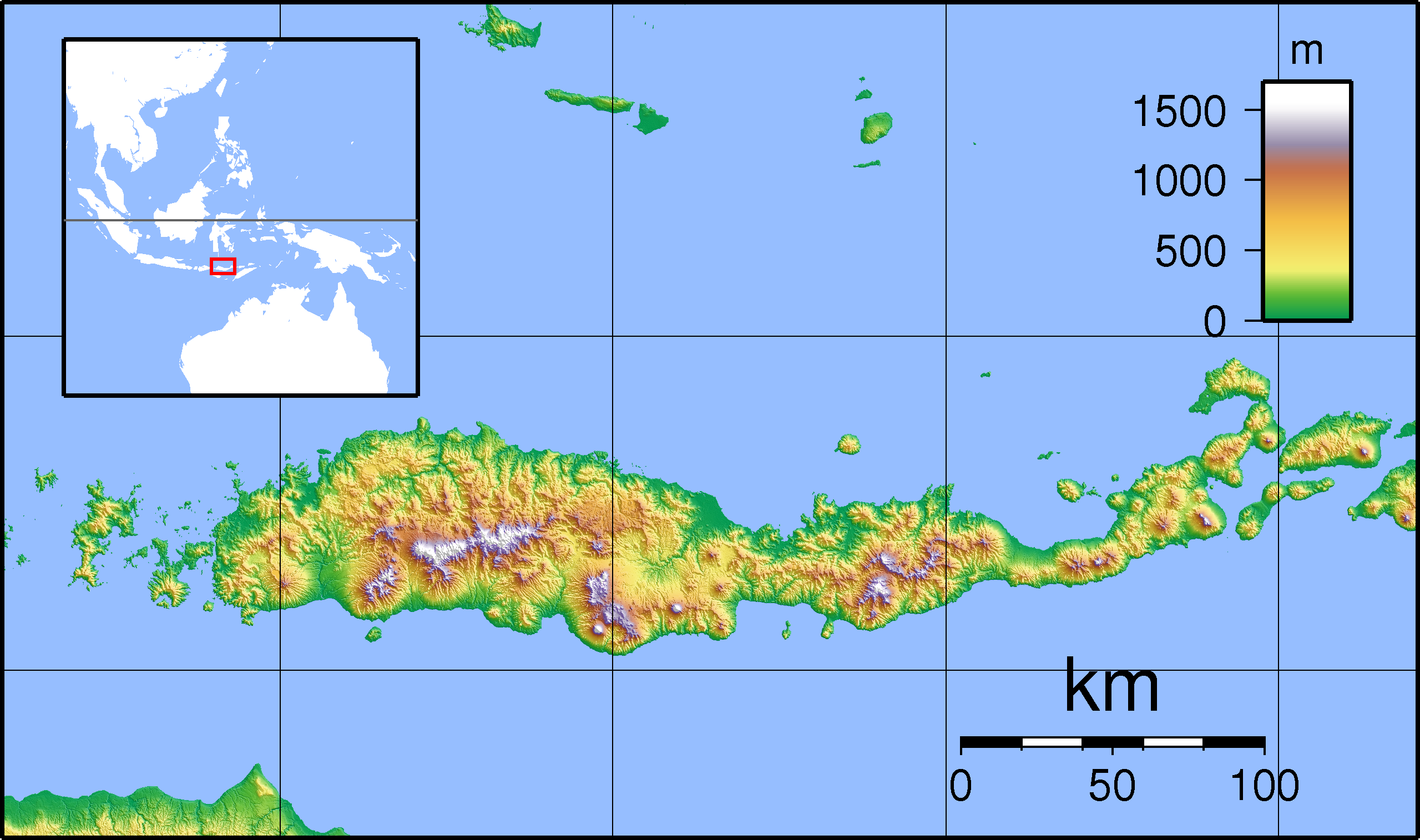
- Location within Flores
- Location: Ende Regency, Flores Island, Indonesia

Geology
- Mountain type: Complex volcano
- Volcanic arc: Sunda Arc
- Last eruption: June to July 1968

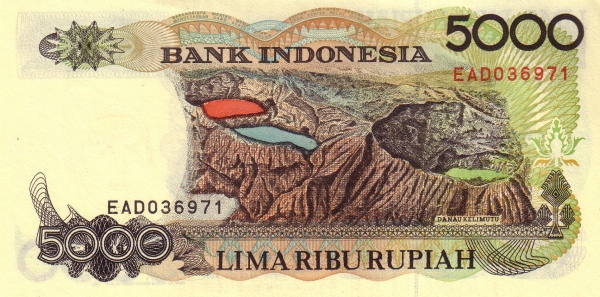
Kelimutu featured on a 5,000-rupiah banknote

Kelimutu (pronounced [kəliˈmutu]) is a volcano close to the small town of Moni in central Flores island in Indonesia. It is around 50 km (31 mi) to the east of Ende, Indonesia, the capital of Ende regency in East Nusa Tenggara province. It has three volcanic crater lakes that differ in color. Tiwu Ata Mbupu, on the western side of the island is blue in color while Tiwu Nua Muri Kooh Tai and Tiwu Ata Polo are usually colors of green and red. These lakes shift color due to changes that occur within the geology and chemistry of the volcano.

The science of the Kelimutu lakes is relatively well-known, and the changes in color and temperature are concluded to be related to volcanic activity and the resulting fluid flux at vents at the bottom of the lakes. The Lake colors periodically change due to adjustments in the oxidation-reduction status of the fluid of each lake, and also considering the abundance of different major elements, such as iron and manganese. Oxidation-reduction status depends on the balance of volcanic gas input and rainfall rate, and is thought to be mediated by the groundwater system in the volcano itself. The colors in the lakes change independently from each other, as each has its own unique connectivity to the underlying volcano's activity. Between January and November 2016, the colors of the craters changed six times. Although it is widely believed that the changes are unpredictable, it is more accurate to say that the lack of any regular monitoring of the volcanic system precludes scientists from having the data necessary to drive widely available predictive models.

== History ==
Kelimutu has 3 historically significant volcanic events that were recorded. The first event occurred in 1865 for more than 5 years and was a Phreatic eruption, where hot water is heated until it erupts into an explosion of steam. The two later eruptions, 1938 and 1968, have been defined as hydrothermal explosions. Background activities still occur within the lakes. Volcanic hydrothermal vents create gasses that are released into the lakes and cause bubbling and even boiling. The high temperatures of the lakes are also a result of the high temperatures of the volcanic system below.

== Geology ==
Kelimutu lies within the Sunda Arc, a volcanic arc that was formed by the subduction of the Indo-Australian Plate under the Eurasian Plate. This tectonic activity creates numerous volcanoes in and across Indonesia, including Kelimutu. The volcano contains three striking summit crater lakes of varying colors. Tiwu Ata Bupu (Lake of Old People) is usually blue and is the westernmost of the three lakes. The other two lakes, Tiwu Ko'o Fai Nuwa Muri (Lake of Young Men and Maidens) and Tiwu Ata Polo (Bewitched or Enchanted Lake) are separated by a shared crater wall and are typically green or red respectively. The lake colors vary on a periodic basis. Subaqueous fumaroles are the probable cause of active upwelling that occurs at the two eastern lakes.

Kelimutu's most recent eruption took place between June and July 1968, which included minor phreatic explositons. Ash and gas emissions were reported, but no significant lava flows occurred. Historical eruptions have created the crater lakes. The Tiwu Ko'o Fai Nuwa Muri has been a source of minor phreatic eruptions in historical time. The summit of the compound 1,639 m (5,377 ft) high Kelimutu volcano is elongated 2 km (1.2 mi) in a WNW-ESE direction; the older cones of Kelido and Kelibara are located respectively 3 km (1.9 mi) to the north and 2 km (1.2 mi) to the south. The scenic lakes are a popular tourist destination.

=== Geochemistry ===
Kelimutu is also of interest to geologists, because the three lakes have different colors, yet are at the crest of the same volcano. According to Kelimutu National Park officials, the colour changes as a result of chemical reactions resulting from the minerals contained in the lake perhaps triggered by volcano gas activity. The lakes' colors are determined by the volcanic gases, such as sulfur dioxide and hydrogen sulfide, released by the subaqueous fumaroles. The chemical reactions occur between metals, gases, and water acidity. This can be seen in the different and very low pH's of each of the lakes. The pH has been recorded to be as low as 0.5. However, it is more accurate to refer to the color changes as being driven by oxidation-reduction chemical dynamics. Studies also show that temperature fluctuations play a role in the lakes colors, with the lake temperatures ranging from 21 °C to 30 °C, depending on the lake and level of volcanic activity occurring.

Tiwu Ata Polo has been observed to fluctuate between red and green colors, controlled by sulfur concentrations and gas bubbling near the lakes shore. Tiwu Nua Muri Kooh Tai has yellow sulfur deposits, with lake water temperatures which indicate high fumarole activity during periods of increased gas output. Kelimutus lakes extremely low pH values increase chloride and sulfate concentrations, which further influence chemical composition. Kawah Putih lake in West Java, south of Bandung, is another crater lake in Indonesia with some similarities to the lakes at Kelimutu.

=== Gas Emissions ===
Active fumaroles under the lakes continuously release gases like sulfur dioxide and carbon dioxide. These gases contribute to the changes in color and temperature. Diffuse white plumes can be seen rising from the lakes and sulfur deposits accumulate on the shores of the lakes. The upwelling of gases and water mixing are responsible for the boiling sounds heard around the lake, which is a telling sign of magmatic-hydrothermal interaction.

== Tourism ==
In the early days of developing the local national park in the Kelimutu area, there were some disputes with local communities over the use of the resources. More recently, forest rangers have worked to develop better relations with nearby village communities and overall management has improved.

Kelimutu is one of the mountains listed as a ribu in Indonesia which are mountains in Indonesia which are more than 1,000 metres (3,281 ft) high.

The area is said to have begun to attract attention after being noticed by a regional Dutch military commander, B. van Suchtelen in 1915 and became more well known after Y. Bouman wrote about the site in 1929.

The closest airports are Maumere, and Ende. There are regular flights to Ende from Bali. The drive from Ende to Moni, the town at the base of Kelimutu where accommodation is available, takes about 3 hours, while from Moni to Kelimutu vehicle park, a 13 kilometres (8.1 mi) drive, needs 45 minutes. Usually tourists sleep one night to catch sunrise at Kelimutu.

== Culture ==
Kelimutu is sacred to the local Lio people, who believe the souls of the dead migrate here. Young people's souls go to the warmth of Tiwu Koo Fai Nuwa Muri (Lake of Young Men and Maidens), old people's to the cold of Tiwu Ata Bupu (Lake of Old People), and those of the wicked to Tiwu Ata Polo (Bewitched or Enchanted Lake). Pork, betel nuts, rice and other valuable offerings are left on ceremonial rocks beside the lakes, amid the dancing of the Lio's annual 'Feed the Spirit of the Forefathers' ceremony, on August 14.

== See also ==
- Kelimutu National Park
- List of volcanoes in Indonesia

== Gallery ==
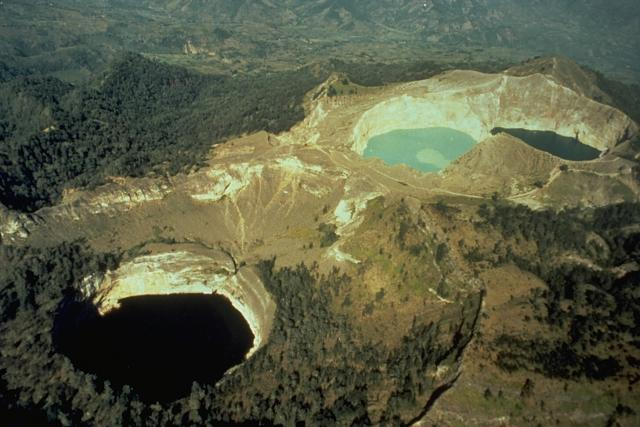
Aerial view from the krater lakes, at the lower left is the Tiwu Ata Mbupu (Lake of Old People), at the upper centre Tiwu Ko'o Fai Nuwa Muri (Lake of Young Men and Maiden) and Tiwu Ata Polo (Bewitched, or Enchanted Lake) at the upper right.

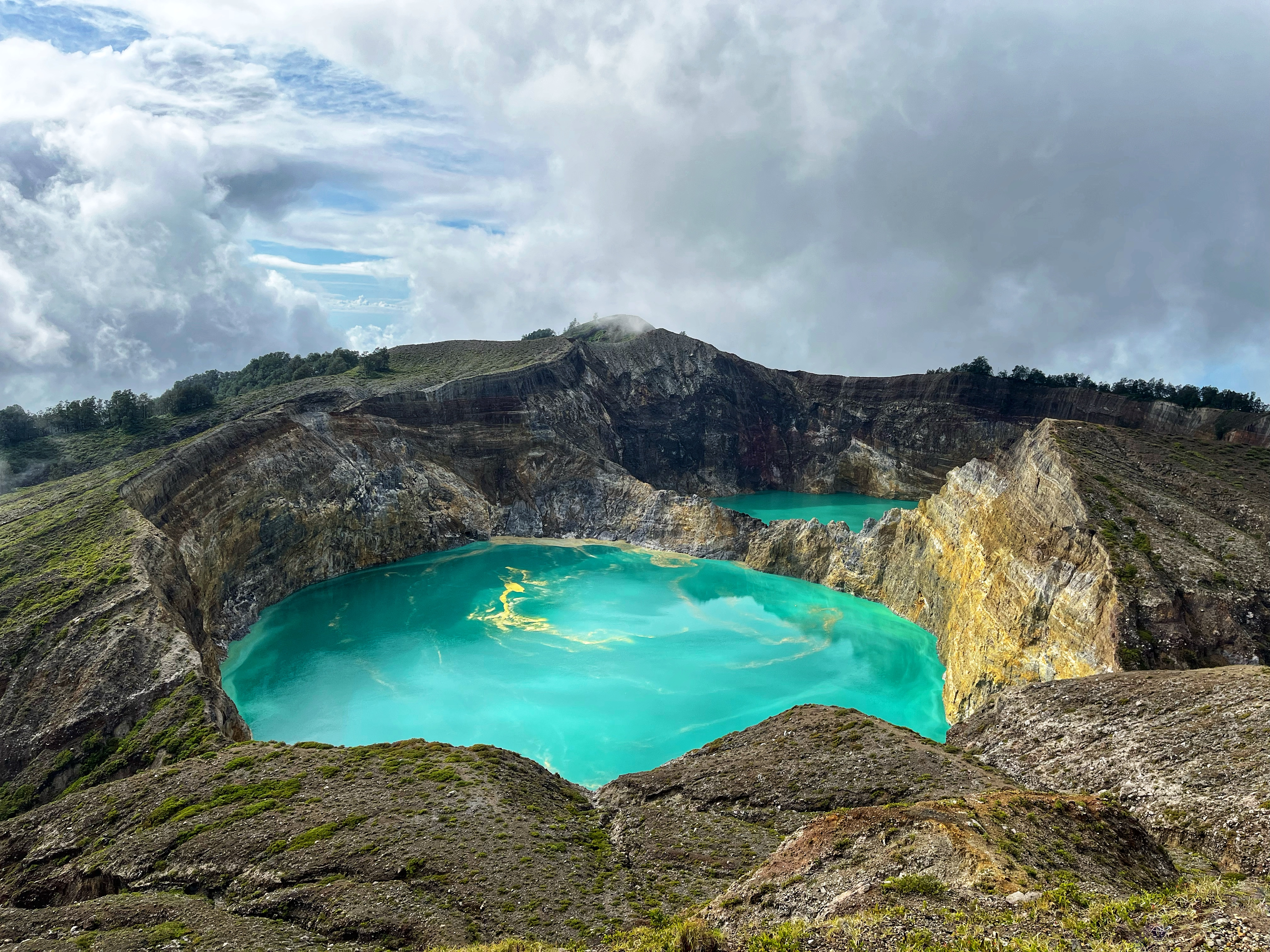
Tiwu Ko'o Fai Nuwa Muri and Tiwu Ata Polo

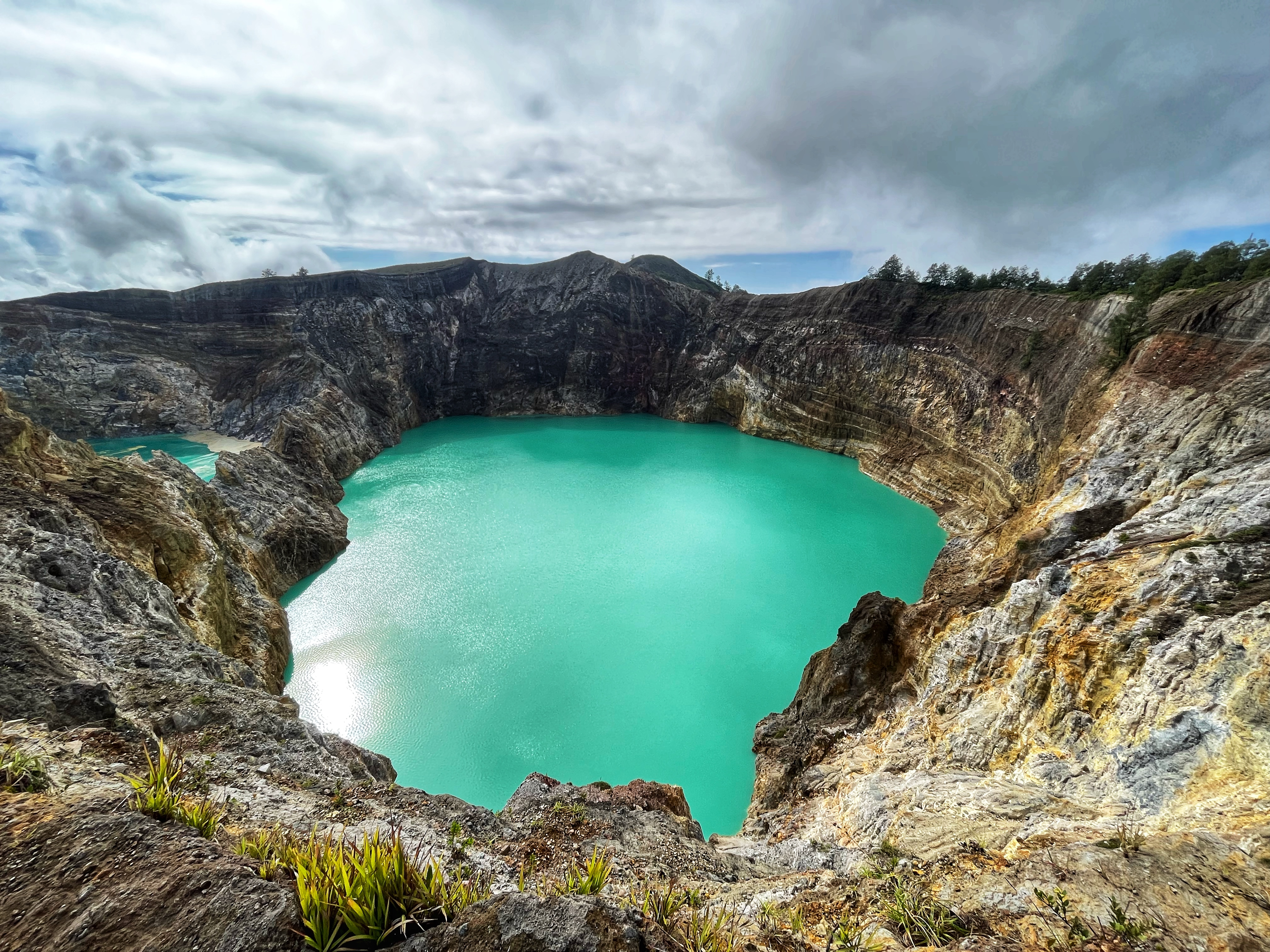
Tiwu Ata Polo (Bewitched, or Enchanted Lake)

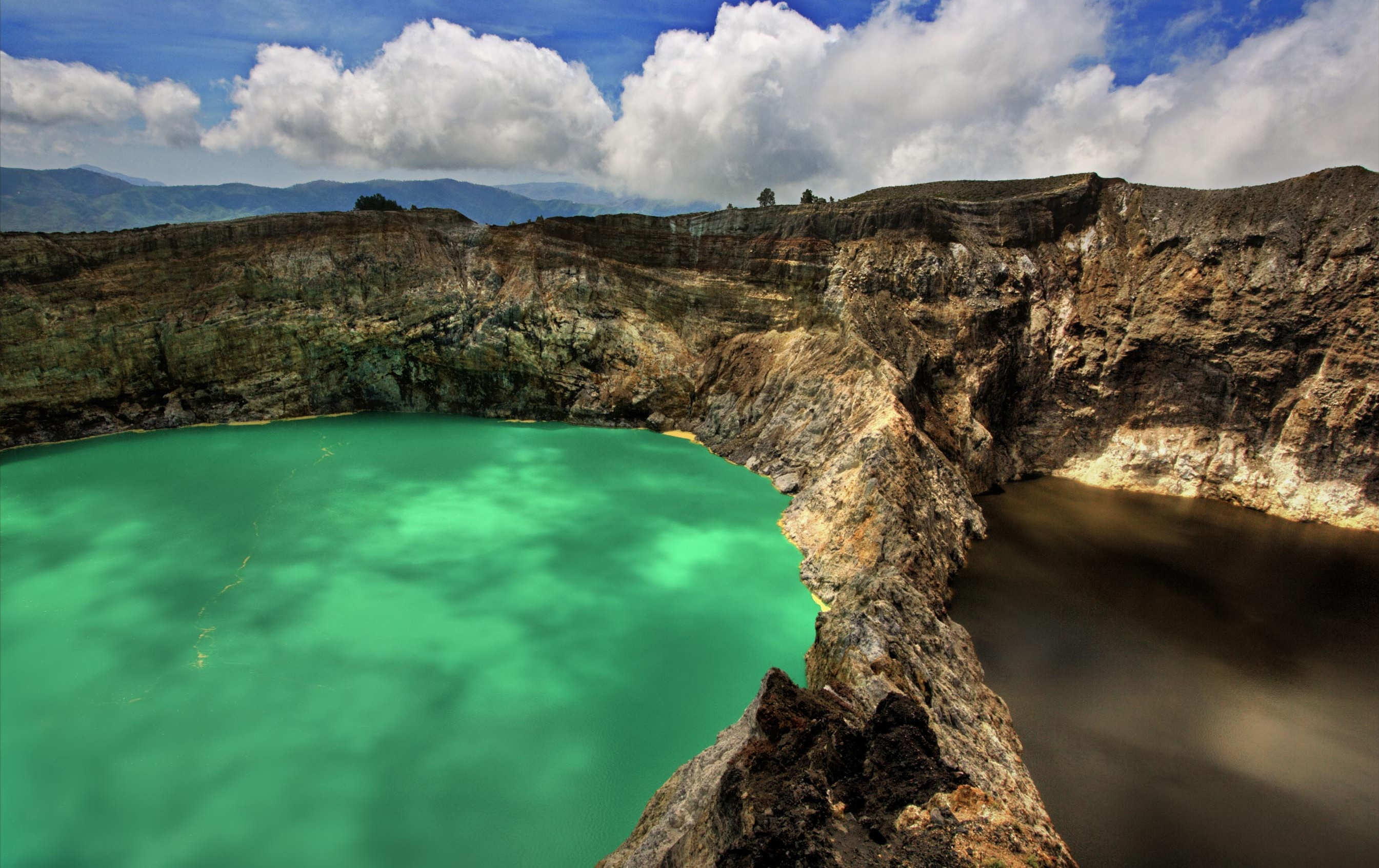
Tiwu Ko'o Fai Nuwa Muri and Tiwu Ata Polo

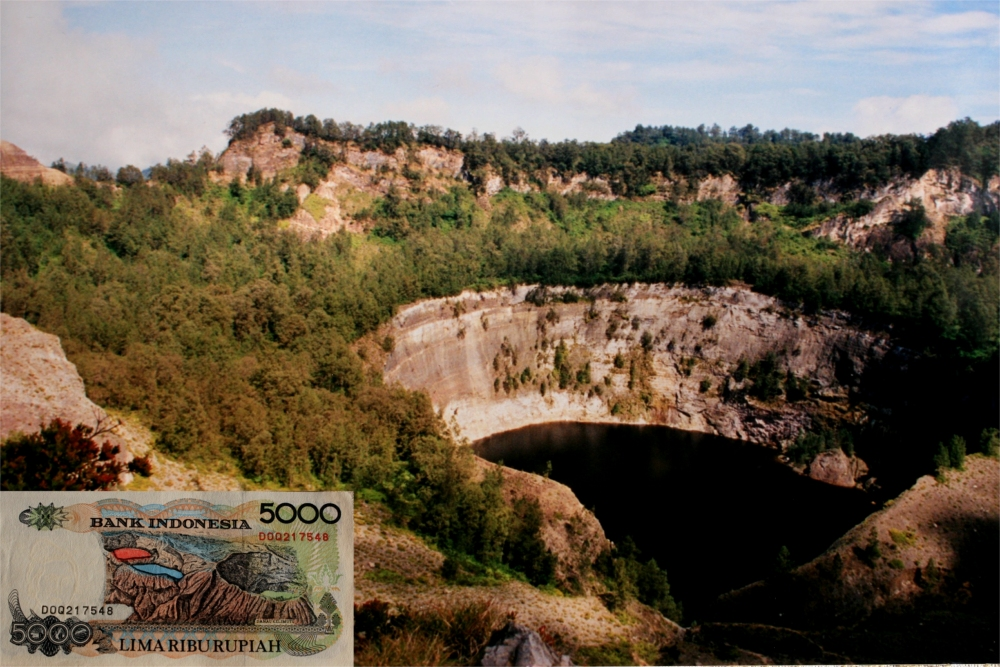
Tiwu Ata Bupu (Lake of Old People)
