= Mount Gamkonora =

Mountain in Indonesia

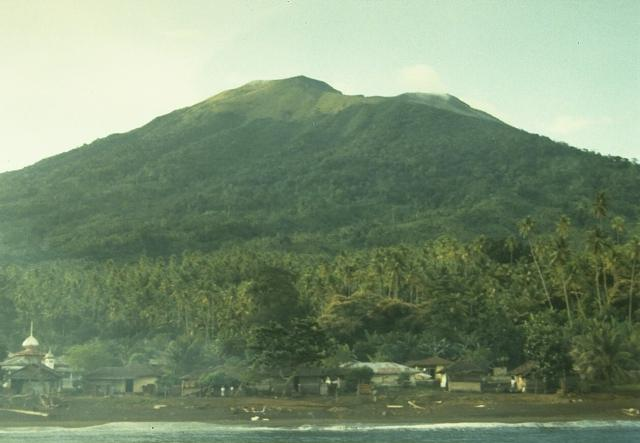
- Mount Gamkonora in 1984

Highest point
- Elevation: 1,560 m (5,120 ft)
- Prominence: 1,560 m (5,120 ft)
- Listing: Ultra; Ribu
- Coordinates: 1°22′42″N 127°32′03″E

Geography
- Location within Indonesia
- Location: Halmahera, Indonesia

Geology
- Mountain type: Stratovolcano
- Last eruption: July 2007

Mount Gamkonora is a stratovolcano on Halmahera island, Indonesia. With an elevation of 1,560 metres (5,118 ft), it is the highest peak on the island. It has produced an elongated series of craters along the north–south rift.

Mount Gamkonora is an active volcano that produced 13 eruptions with indices from 1 to 5 on the Volcanic Explosivity Index (VEI). The largest eruption occurred on 20 May 1673 (VEI-5) and was accompanied by a tsunami which inundated the nearby villages. Between 1564 and 1989 the volcano erupted twelve times.

The volcano erupted again on 10 July 2007, with over 8,000 people reported to have fled their homes in the vicinity.

== See also ==
- List of volcanoes in Indonesia
- List of ultras of the Malay Archipelago
