= Batui Mountains =

Mountain range in Indonesia

Coordinates: 01°24′19″S 122°04′43″E

The Batui Mountains (Pegunungan Batui) are a mountain range in Central Sulawesi, Indonesia. The range runs east–west and forms part of the spine of the East Peninsula of the island of Sulawesi. The most prominent peak is Mount Batui at 1,930 metres (6,332 ft) high.
