= Pesawaran-Ratai =

Volcano in Indonesia

Highest point
- Elevation: 1,575 m (5,167 ft)
- Coordinates: 5.505°S 105.093°E

Geography
- Location: Sumatra, Indonesia

Geology
- Mountain type: Stratovolcano
- Volcanic arc: Sunda Arc

Pesawaran-Ratai is a 1,575 m (5,167 ft) Quaternary stratovolcano in Lampung, southern Sumatra, Indonesia. The volcano features a crater breached to the north representing a sector collapse. Along the southern slopes, there are geysers and hot springs.

== See also ==
- List of volcanoes in Indonesia
