= Raung =

Active volcano in East Java, Indonesia

Mount Raung
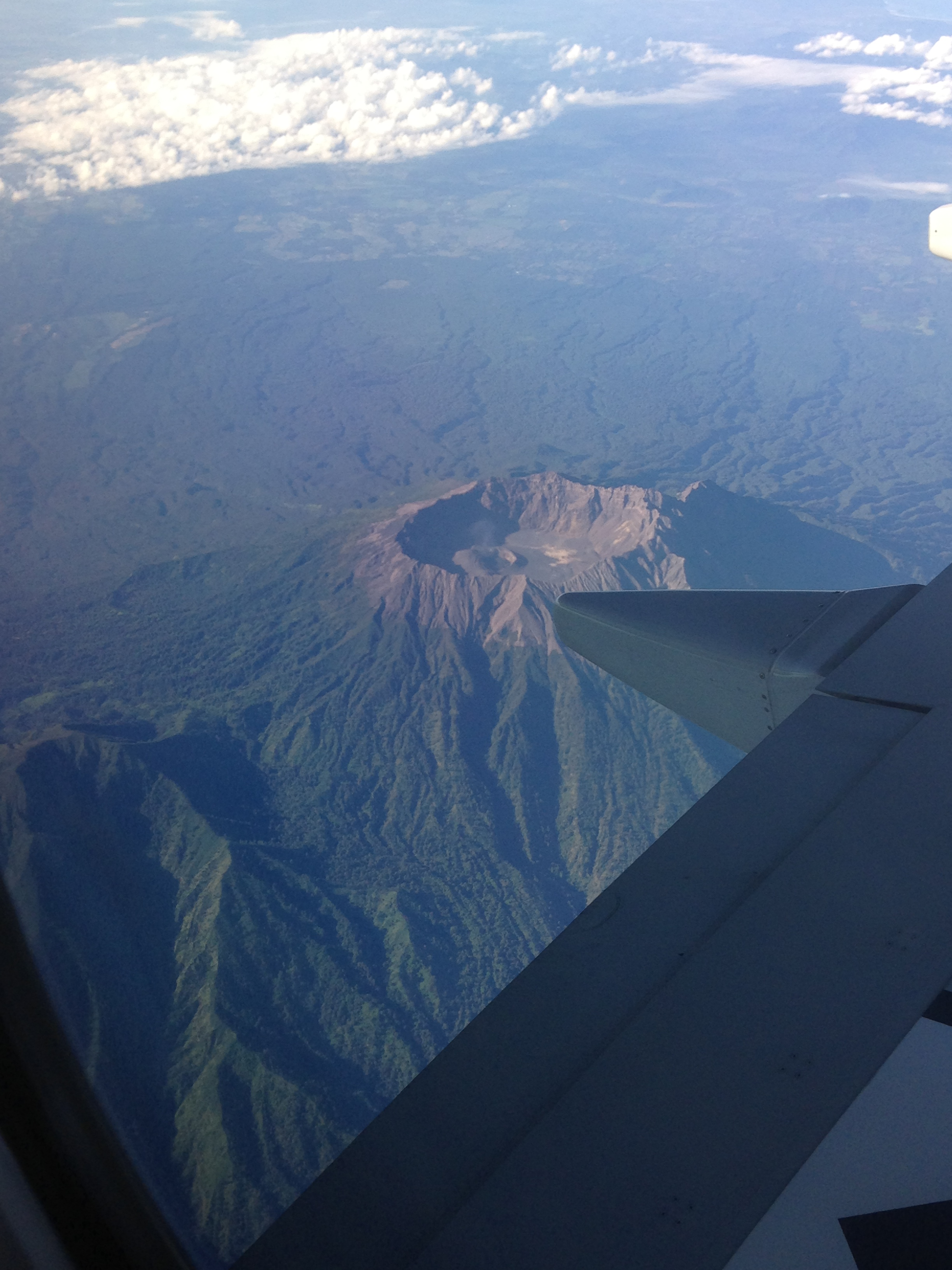
- Mount Raung crater, aerial view captured by plane, 2013

Highest point
- Elevation: 3,332 m (10,932 ft)
- Prominence: 3,069 m (10,069 ft); Ranked 83rd
- Listing: Ultra; Ribu
- Coordinates: 8°07′30″S 114°02′30″E

Geography
- Location within Java
- Location: Bondowoso Regency, East Java, Indonesia

Geology
- Mountain type: Stratovolcano
- Volcanic arc: Sunda Arc
- Last eruption: June 2025 (Ongoing)

Climbing
- Easiest route: Sumberwaringin
- Normal route: Kalibaru, Glenmore

The Raung (ꦫꦲꦸꦁ), or Mount Raung (Javanese: ꦒꦸꦤꦸꦁꦫꦲꦸꦁ, romanized: Gunung Raung) is one of the most active volcanoes on the island of Java in Indonesia. It is located in the province of East Java and has a 2-kilometer-wide (1.2 mi) and 500-meter-deep (1,600 ft) caldera surrounded by a grayish rim. The difference in color of the rim and the flanks of the volcanoes is caused by the rim’s lack of vegetation compared with the healthy and extensive vegetation on the flanks. Raung, standing almost 3,332 metres (10,932 ft) above sea level, is the tallest volcano of this cluster. Its summit, in Bondowoso Regency, is also the highest point of the regency.

Although the valleys between the major volcanoes boast fertile, ash-enriched soil for agriculture, available land is very limited. Raung contains centres constructed along a NE to SW line, with Gunung Suket and Gunung Gadung stratovolcanoes being located to the northeast and west, respectively. Mount Raung can be seen from Lovina Beach, Singaraja, North Bali. The normal route climbing is through Bondowoso and Sumber Wringin.

Its earliest recorded eruption was in 1586 which resulted in fatalities; between 1586 and 1817, five more deadly eruptions were recorded.

== 2015 Eruption ==
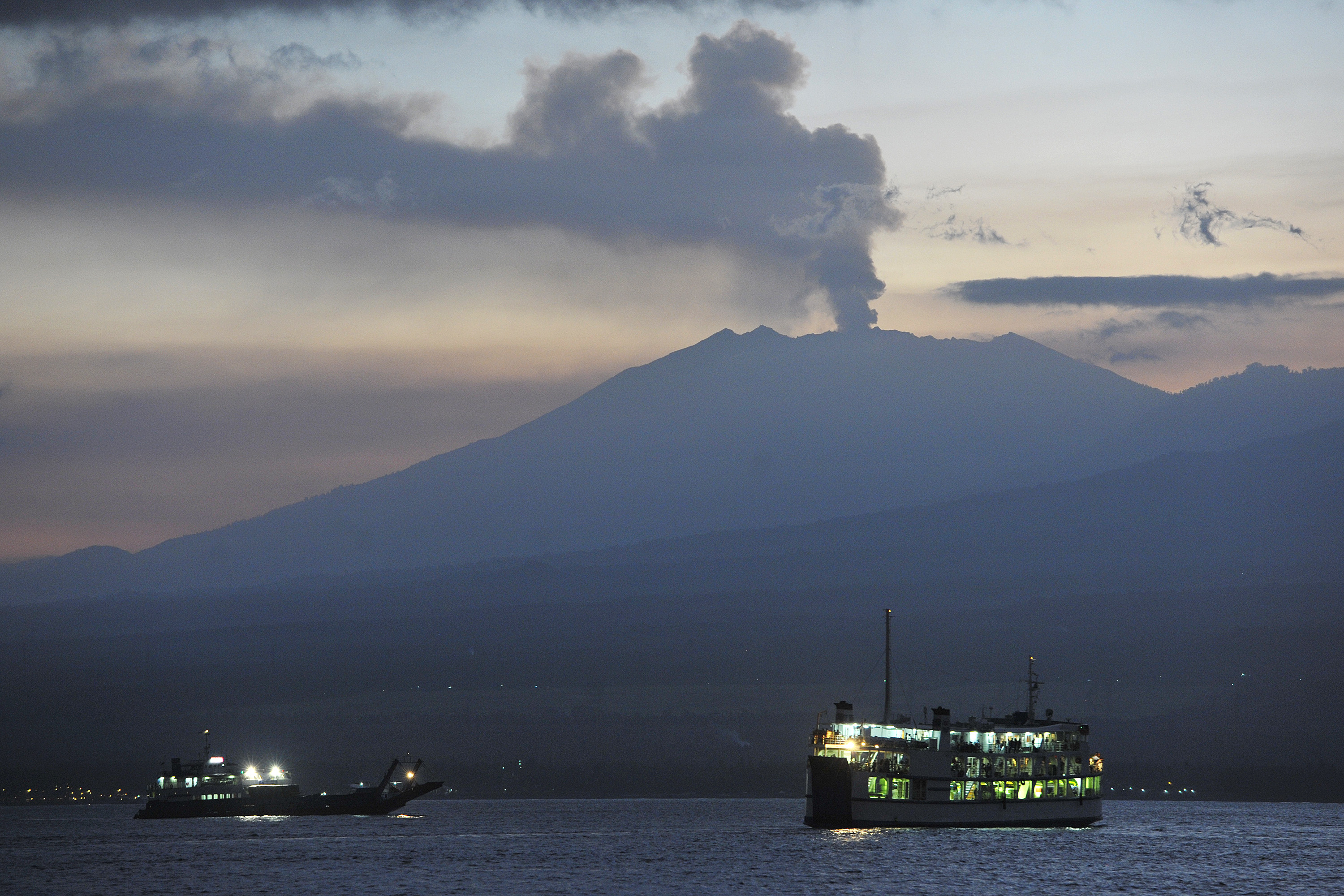
Raung eruption seen from Bali Strait

The volcano started to display increased activity on 24 June 2015, and on 29 June 2015, began to eject material causing a dust cloud that resulted in warnings being issued to residents within 3 kilometers (1.9 mi) radius of the caldera, and causing disruption to flights in and out of nearby Bali. According to Landsat images in early July 2015, a new lava pool had appeared on the mountain, in addition to the one already present. This was thought to delay the full eruption of the volcano. Currently the caldera is still sufficiently strong to keep the lava inside.

From July 9, 2015, several airports throughout Indonesia—including on the popular holiday island of Bali and in Surabaya during Idul Fitri—were closed due to the ash being produced by the eruptions. The explosive ash emissions stopped during the afternoon of 14 August. It appears likely that the eruption has more or less come to an end.

Activity resumed in 2020. The Global Volcanism Program reported ash emissions from July to November 2020 and from January to August 2021, a short-lived eruption on 27 July 2022, an eruption on 24 December 2024 that sent a plume about 2 km above the summit, and repeated ash emissions between March and July 2025. Some 76 Holocene eruptions are recorded at Raung, the largest reaching VEI 5.

== Hydrological boundary ==
The Raung Mountain complex serves as a natural hydrological boundary dividing seven drainage basins into three different directions. The first is the flow towards the north coast, draining into the Java Sea (Sampean basin). The second is the flow towards the south coast, discharging into the Indian Ocean (Kalibaru, Mayang, and Bedagung basin). The third is the flow towards the east coast, leading to the Bali Strait (Glondong, Bomo, and Setail basin). The convergence point of hydrological boundary is located at the summit of Mount Raung, except for the Bedagung basin, which is sandwiched between the Sampean and Mayang basins.

== Gallery ==
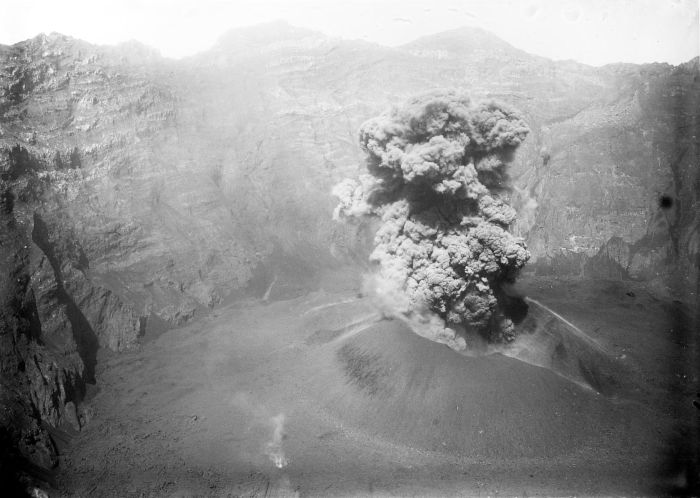
Eruption of 1913

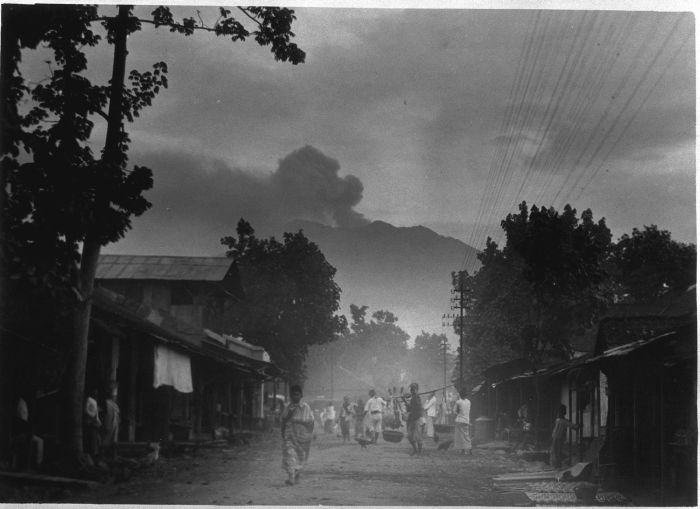
Eruption of 1927

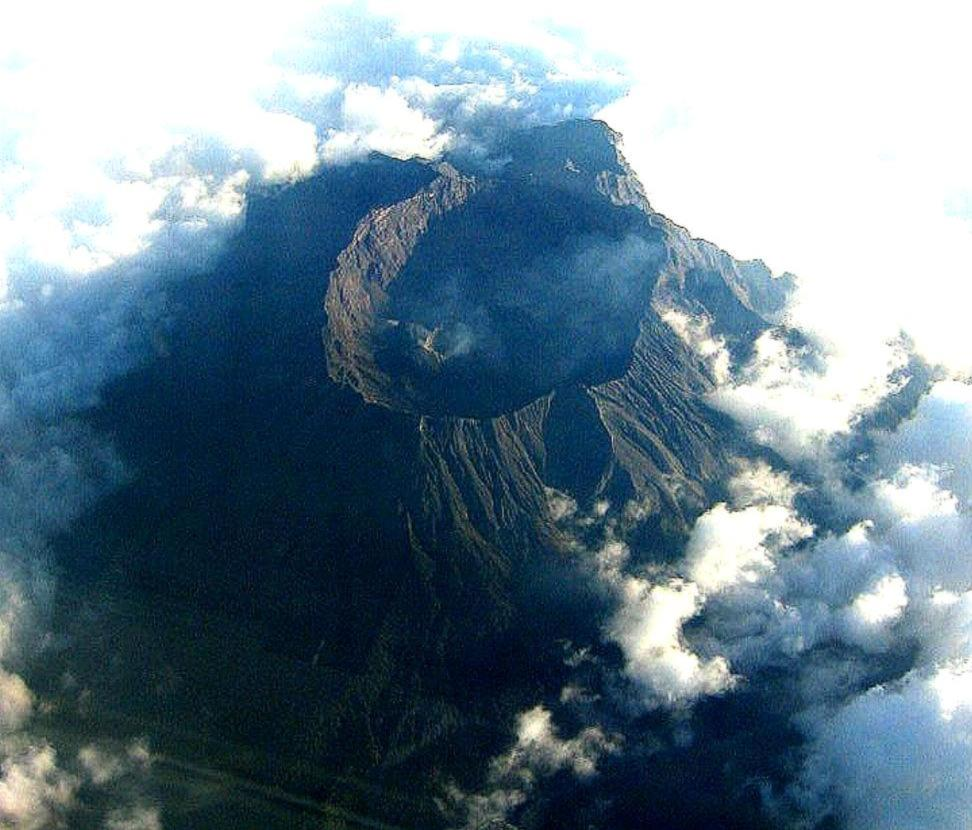
Raung, September 2005

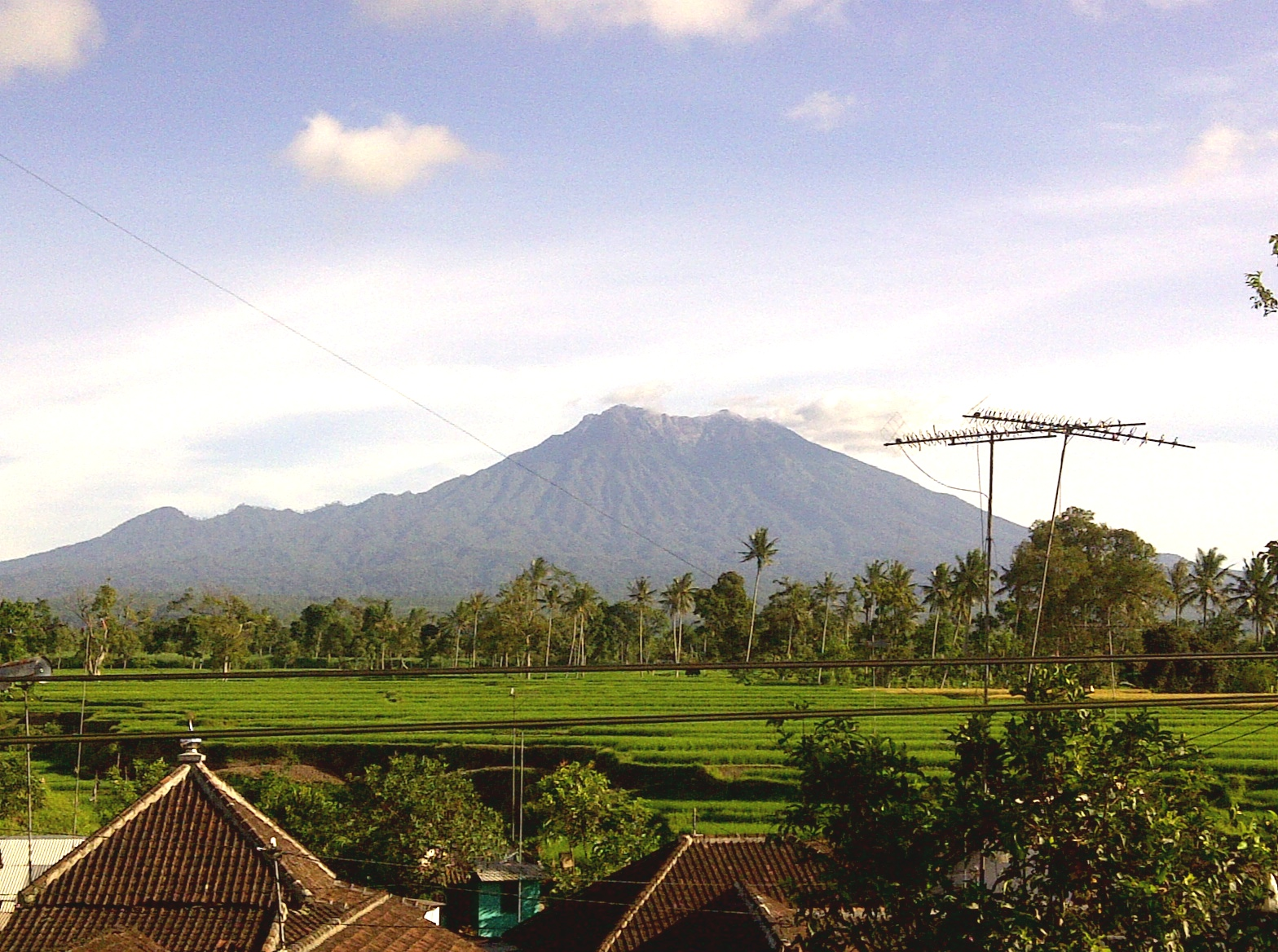
Mount Raung seen from Kalibaru Town, 2013

== See also ==
- List of volcanoes in Indonesia
- List of ultras of the Malay Archipelago
- Mayang River
