= Jantan =

Jantan is a Malaysian surname. Notable people with the surname include:

- Juma'at Jantan (born 1984), Singaporean footballer
- Khairul Hafiz Jantan (born 1998), Malaysian sprinter
- Muhammad Hafizuddeain Jantan (born 1968), Malasyian general
- Shahril Jantan (born 1980), Singaporean footballer
