= Sawal =

- Village
- Location in Punjab, India Sawal (India)
- Coordinates: 31.371480°N 75.393681°E
- Country: India
- State: Punjab
- District: Kapurthala

Government
  - Type: Panchayati raj (India)
  - Body: Gram panchayat

Languages
  - Official: Punjabi
  - Other spoken: Hindi
- Time zone: UTC+5:30 (IST)
- PIN: 144626
- Telephone code: 01828
- ISO 3166 code: IN-PB
- Vehicle registration: PB-41
- Website: kapurthala.gov.in

Sawal is a village in Sultanpur Lodhi tehsil in Kapurthala district of Punjab, India. It is located 5 kilometres (3.1 mi) from the city of Sultanpur Lodhi, 30 kilometres (19 mi) away from district headquarter Kapurthala. The village is administrated by a Sarpanch who is an elected representative of village as per the constitution of India and Panchayati raj (India).
