= Ranakah =

Volcano on the island of Flores, Indonesia

Poco Ranakah
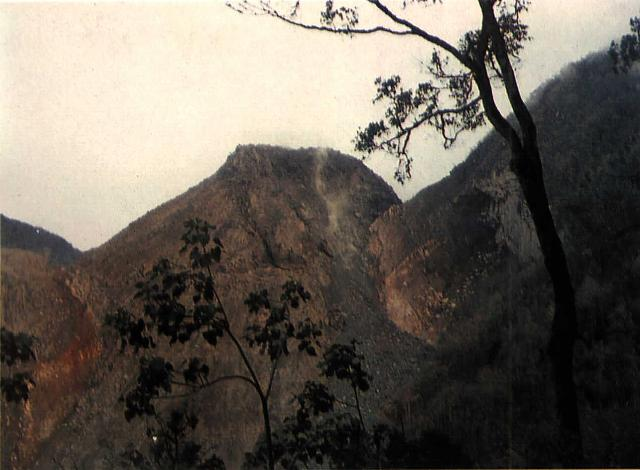

Highest point
- Elevation: 2,350 m (7,710 ft)
- Prominence: 2,350 m (7,710 ft)
- Coordinates: 8.633333°S 120.516667°E

Geography
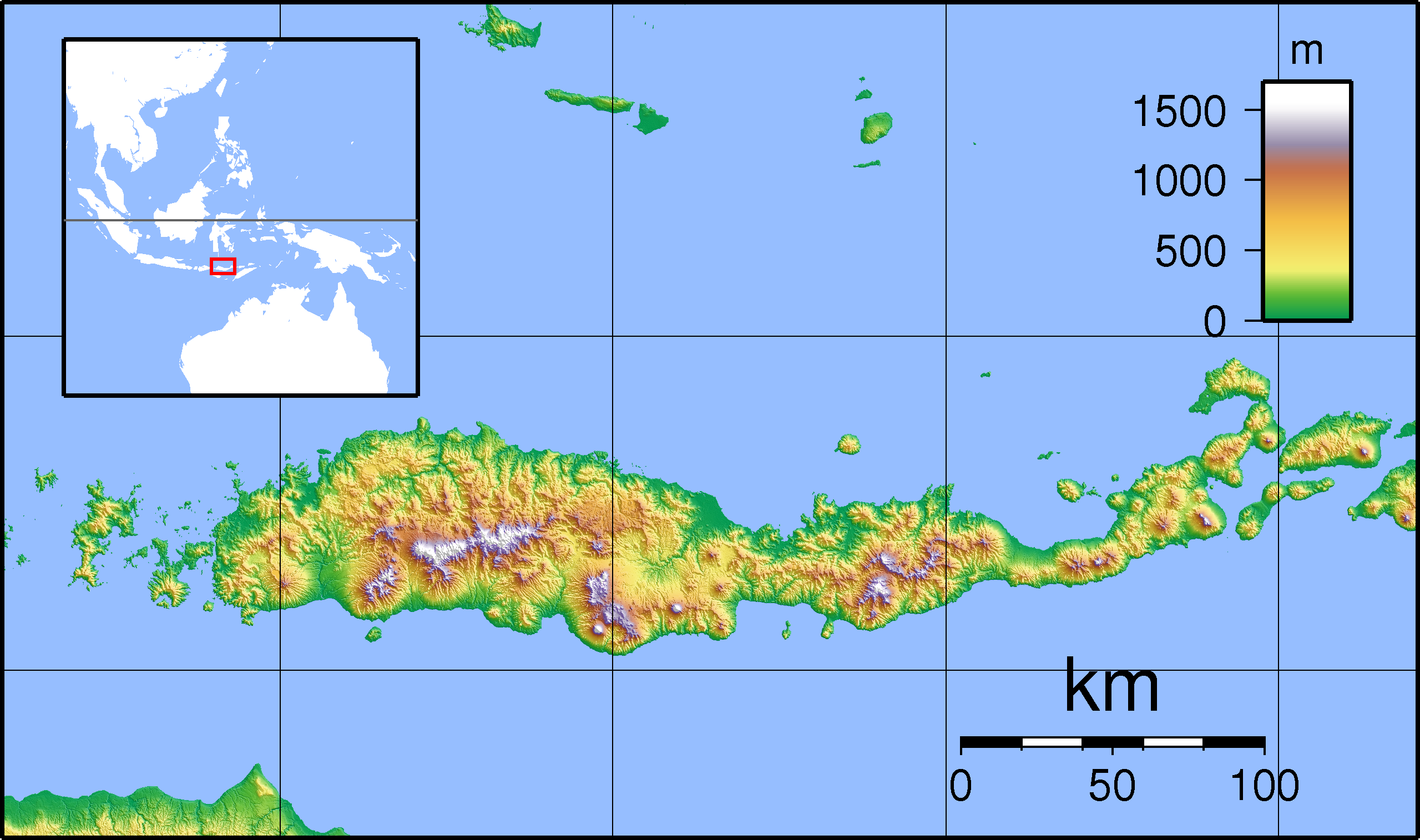
- Location within Flores
- Location: Flores Island, Indonesia

Geology
- Mountain type: Lava domes
- Volcanic arc: Sunda Arc
- Last eruption: March 1991

Poco Ranakah is a volcano located in the south-central part of the island of Flores, Indonesia. Its tallest lava dome, Poco Mandasawu is the tallest mountain of the island. A new lava dome, named Anak Ranakah (the child of Ranakah) was formed there in 1987. The volcano erupted again in 1991. In 2011, diffuse white plumes were seen rising from Anak Ranakah Dome, although no ash was detected.

== See also ==
- List of volcanoes in Indonesia
