= Kerinci =

The term Kerinci can refer to:

- Kerinci Regency, a regency of Jambi, Indonesia
  - Mount Kerinci
  - Lake Kerinci
  - Kerinci people, an ethnic group in Kerinci Regency, Jambi
  - Kerinci language, the Malayic language of the people
  - Kerinci Seblat National Park
