= Sungai Penuh =

City in Jambi, Indonesia

- City
- City of Sungai Penuh; Kota Sungai Penuh
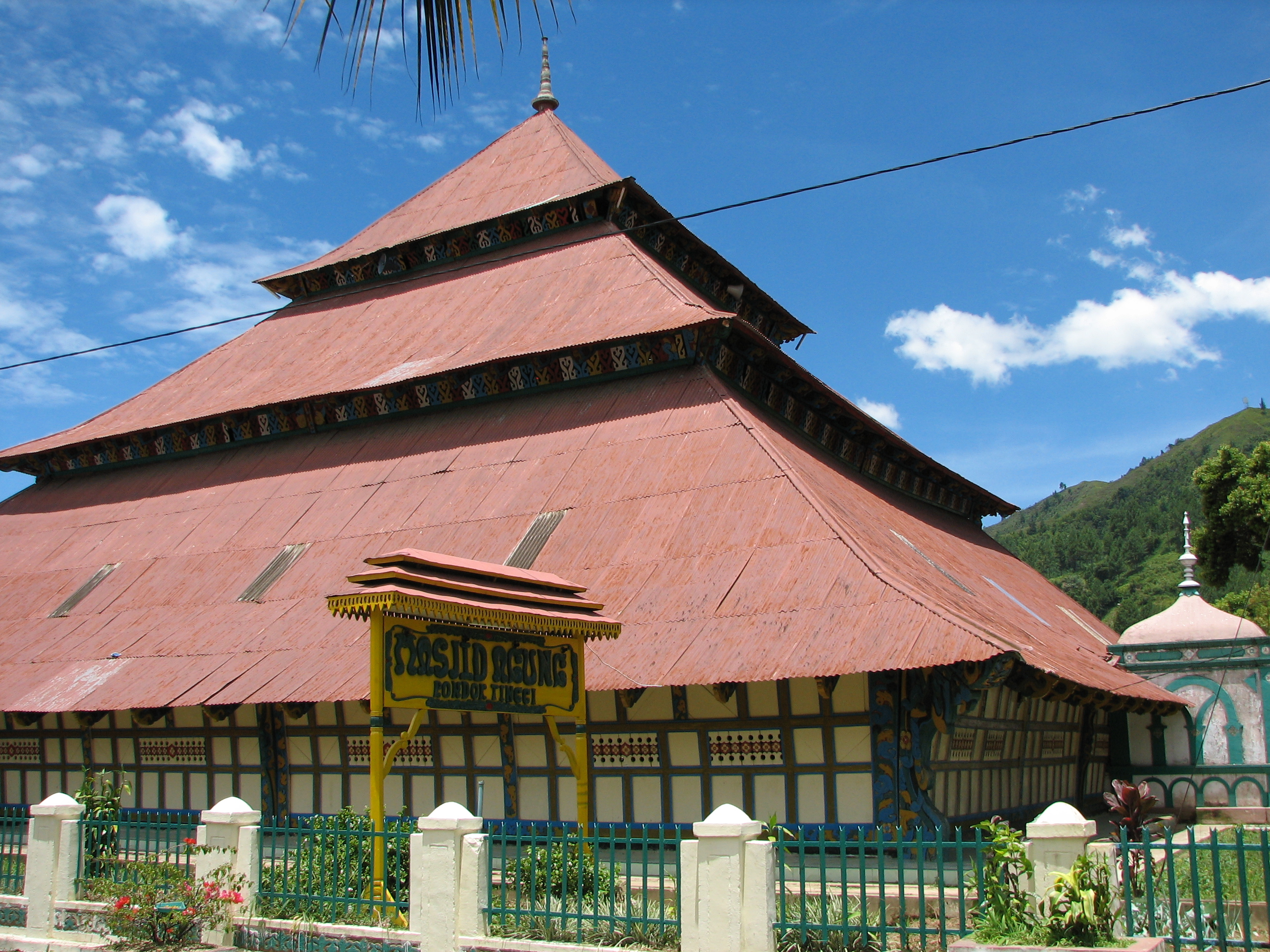
- Agung Mosque, built in 1874

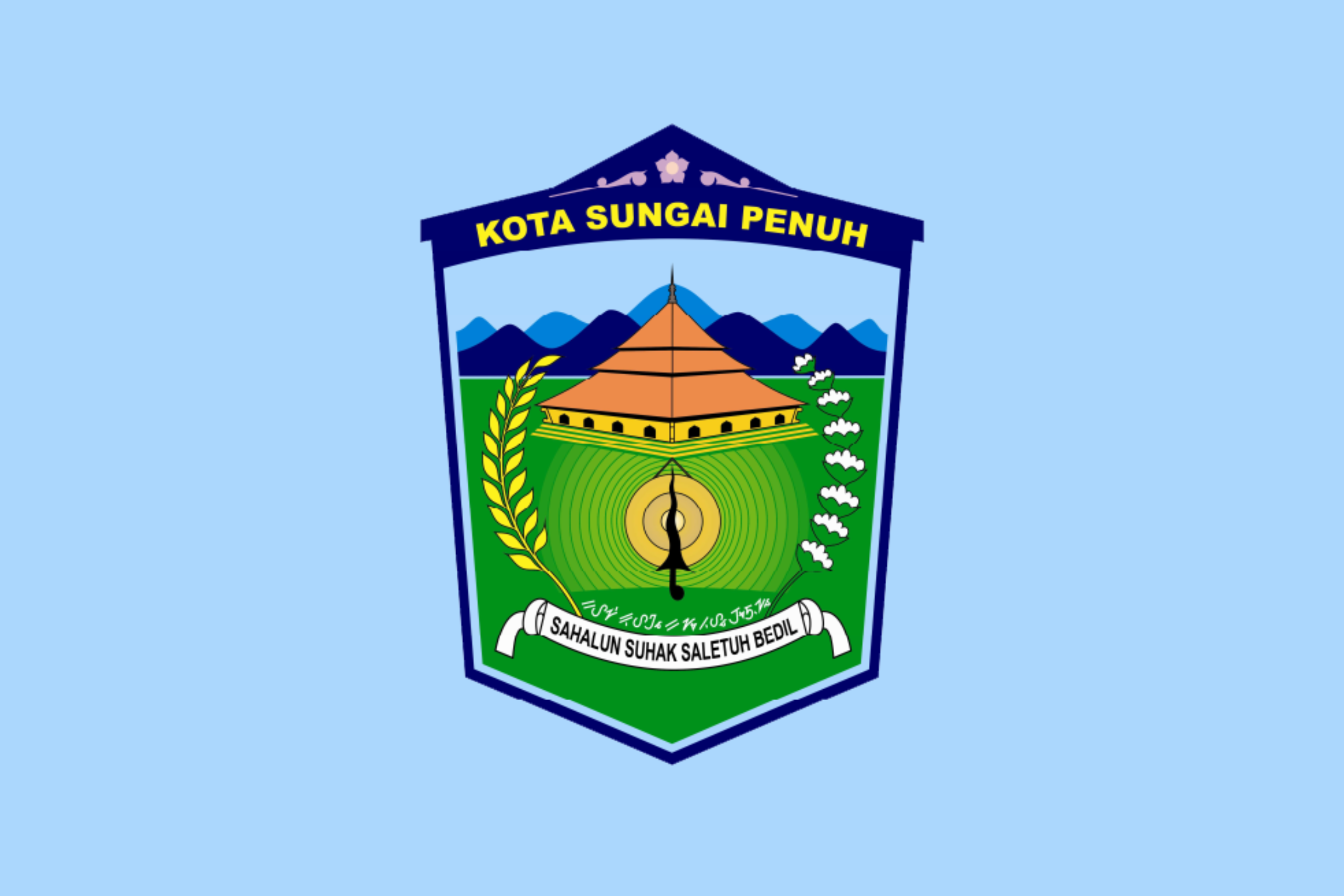
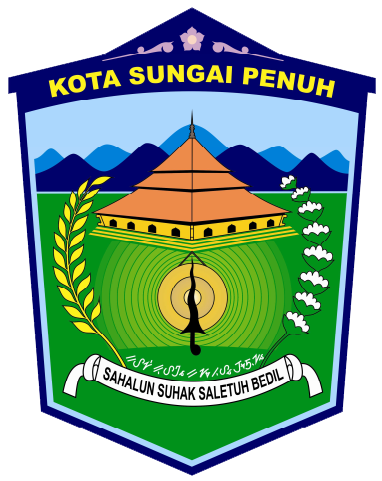
- Flag Coat of arms
- Motto: Sahalun Suhak Saletuh Bedil (By a yell, a rifle fired)
- Location within Jambi

- Location in Sumatra and Indonesia Sungai Penuh (Indonesia)
- Coordinates: 2°3′32″S 101°23′29″E
- Country: Indonesia
- Province: Jambi

Government
  - Mayor: Alfin Bakar
  - Vice Mayor: Azhar Hamzah

Area
  - Total: 364.92 km^{2} (140.90 sq mi)

Population (mid 2025 estimate)
  - Total: 102,708
  - Density: 281.45/km^{2} (728.96/sq mi)
- Time zone: UTC+7 (Indonesia Western Time)
- Postcodes: 3xxxx
- Area code: (+62) 748
- HDI (2024): ▲0.774 (High)
- Website: sungaipenuhkota.go.id

Sungai Penuh (Indonesian: Kota Sungai Penuh) is a city in Jambi province, Indonesia, on the island of Sumatra. It is an enclave within Kerinci Regency, of which it was formerly part but from which it became administratively separate on 24 June 2008. It covers an area of 364.92 km^{2} and had a population of 82,293 at the 2010 Census and 96,610 at the 2020 Census; the official estimate as at mid 2025 was 102,708 (comprising 51,555 males and 51,153 females). Historically, it has been the center of administration for the whole Kerinci highlands region since the Dutch colonial era. Today, it is one of only two cities in Jambi and the largest settlement on the western part of the province.

== History ==
=== Etymology ===
The name of the city translates in Malay to "full river" or "river that never runs out". The city is surrounded by multiple rivers as well as a spring named cumon pule, which roughly also means "spring that never runs out". The name of the city, Sungai Penuh, was mentioned in a Jawi script letter in 1923 signed by Sultan Muhammad Syah of Jambi, later identified as written by Datuk Singarapi Sulah of Dusun Ampeh, a local ruler from the region within the today's city. The mansucript is a rewritten copy of an older manuscript, which translates to:

"...after that, the water is down, seems in downstream of Dusun Ampeh a streamlet flows evermore. The streamlet is full, never runs out, and is also called Sungai Penuh. Until nowadays, the place is used for taking a bath and praying."

According to this manuscript, Sungai Penuh refers to the streamlet that never runs out and not referring to an actual specific river, as the word "sungai" in Kerinci language does not necessarily translates solely to a proper river unlike in Malay.

=== Early and colonial history ===
The city used to be a dusun (village), which in Kerinci society was led by a depati, an elected traditional village chief. Kerinci villages used titles stylized similar to those of Minangkabau, such as datuk and rajo, due to influence from neighbouring Minangkabau and Malay states since the Hindhu-Buddhist era. The dusun, or village of Sungai Penuh used to be ruled by five clans, which were collectively called limo luhah. The rule of these clans was later legitimized by Jambi royal charters, issued by Jambi Sultanate from the eastern coast, suggesting the influence of the sultanate in the Kerinci highlands. These royal charters suggested that the village that became Sungai Penuh has existed at least since 1704 to 1778, based on royal charter manuscripts discovered.

Kerinci highlands were annexed into the Dutch East Indies following an expedition in 1903. In the aftermath of it, Sanggaran Agung, a small village near the Lake Kerinci was chosen as the administrative capital and the region was organized under Onder-Afdeeling Koerintji. However, in 1909, due to an earthquake, the capital was moved to Sungai Penuh. In 1913, the Onder-Afdeeling Koerintji was upgraded into an afdeeling, keeping Sungai Penuh the administrative capital. This spurred economic growth as the colonial administrative importance of the then-small village grew into a new town. By the 1940s, Sungai Penuh had grown and was described as the largest town in the highlands of Kerinci.

=== Recent history ===
During the Indonesian National Revolution, especially in the aftermath of the second Dutch military aggression, the town became an important supply node for the Emergency Government of the Republic of Indonesia based in Bukittinggi, being the site of weapon and rice stockpiles. It was also the headquarter of Banteng Division's 2nd Regiment of the Indonesian Army. Under the newly-established Indonesian Republic, Sungai Penuh became capital of first Pesisir Selatan-Kerinci Regency from 1948 under Central Sumatra province, and later then-larger Kerinci Regency under Jambi province from 1958 all the way to 2008, where it was granted a city status and became an independent autonomous city. It has since become an important gateway for the Kerinci highlands, and its economy, having becoming tourism-oriented, supports the surrounding region.

== Geography ==
=== Climate ===
Climate data for Sungai Penuh (Depati Parbo Airport), elevation 782 m (2,566 ft), (1991–2020 normals)
Month	Jan	Feb	Mar	Apr	May	Jun	Jul	Aug	Sep	Oct	Nov	Dec	Year
Mean daily maximum °C (°F)	27.7 (81.9)	28.1 (82.6)	28.5 (83.3)	28.8 (83.8)	28.9 (84.0)	28.7 (83.7)	28.4 (83.1)	28.3 (82.9)	28.2 (82.8)	28.2 (82.8)	28.1 (82.6)	27.8 (82.0)	28.3 (82.9)
Daily mean °C (°F)	22.3 (72.1)	22.3 (72.1)	22.4 (72.3)	22.7 (72.9)	22.9 (73.2)	22.5 (72.5)	22.2 (72.0)	22.2 (72.0)	22.2 (72.0)	22.3 (72.1)	22.4 (72.3)	22.3 (72.1)	22.4 (72.3)
Mean daily minimum °C (°F)	17.5 (63.5)	17.4 (63.3)	17.5 (63.5)	18.0 (64.4)	17.8 (64.0)	17.6 (63.7)	17.1 (62.8)	17.0 (62.6)	17.3 (63.1)	17.4 (63.3)	17.8 (64.0)	17.8 (64.0)	17.5 (63.5)
Source: World Meteorological Organization

== Governance ==
=== Administrative districts ===
At the 2010 Census there were five districts (kecamatan), but three more were added subsequently. The eight districts currently forming the city are listed below with their areas and their populations at the 2010 Census and the 2020 Census, together with the official estimates as at mid 2025. The table also includes the locations of the district administrative centres, the number of villages in each district (totaling 4 urban kelurahan and 65 rural desa), and its post code(s).

Kode Wilayah	Name of District (kecamatan)	Area in km^{2}	Population Census 2010	Population Census 2020	Population Estimate mid 2025	Administrative centre	No. of villages	Post code
15.72.04	Tanah Kampung	11.14	8,396	10,797	11,257	Koto Panap	13	37121
15.72.05	Kumun Debai	148.62	8,421	10,128	11,275	Ulu Air	9	37111
15.72.01	Sungai Penuh	3.14	35,067	10,372	10,605	Pasar Sungai Penuh	5 ^{(a)}	37111 ^{(b)}
15.72.06	Pondok Tinggi	73.87	^{(c)}	18,516	18,812	Aur Duri	8 ^{(d)}	37111 ^{(e)}
15.72.08	Sungai Bungkal	95.10	^{(c)}	11,055	11,420	Koto Tinggi	6 ^{(f)}	37111 ^{(g)}
15.72.03	Hamparan Rawang	13.05	12,726	14,898	16,316	Simpang Tiga Rawang	13	37151
15.72.02	Pesisir Bukit	18.08	17,683	11,745	13,028	Sungai Liuk	9	37111 & 37152
15.72.07	Koto Baru	1.92	^{(h)}	9,099	9,995	Permai Indah	6	37152
	Totals	364.92	82,293	96,610	102,708		69	

Notes: (a) including the two kelurahan of Pasar Sungai Penuh and Sungai Penuh. (b) except for the kelurahan of Pasar Sungai Penuh, which has a post code of 37113.
(c) the 2010 population of these new districts are included with that of Sungai Penuh District, from which they were cut out in 2013.
(d) includes the kelurahan of Pondok Tinggi. (e) except the kelurahan of Pondok Tinggi, which has a post code of 37114.
(f) includes the kelurahan of Dusun Baru. (g) except the kelurahan of Dusun Baru, which has a post code of 37112.
(h) the 2010 population of Koto Baru District is included with that of Pesisir Bukit District, from which it was cut out in 2013.

== Education ==
The city is home to 55 registered kindergartens, 85 elementary schools, 20 junior high schools, nine senior high schools, as well as five vocational high schools and six tertiary education institutions. The largest of the tertiary education institution in the city is the Kerinci State Islamic Institute, which is a public institution and teach both secular and religious studies and hosts more than 5,000 students as of 2024. Other tertiary institutions, such as Sakti Alam Kerinci Economic College, are private.

== See also ==
- Batang Hari River
- Kerinci Seblat National Park
- Lake Kaco
- Lake Kerinci
- Mount Kerinci
