= Kersik Tua =

Village in Kerinci Regency, Jambi, Indonesia

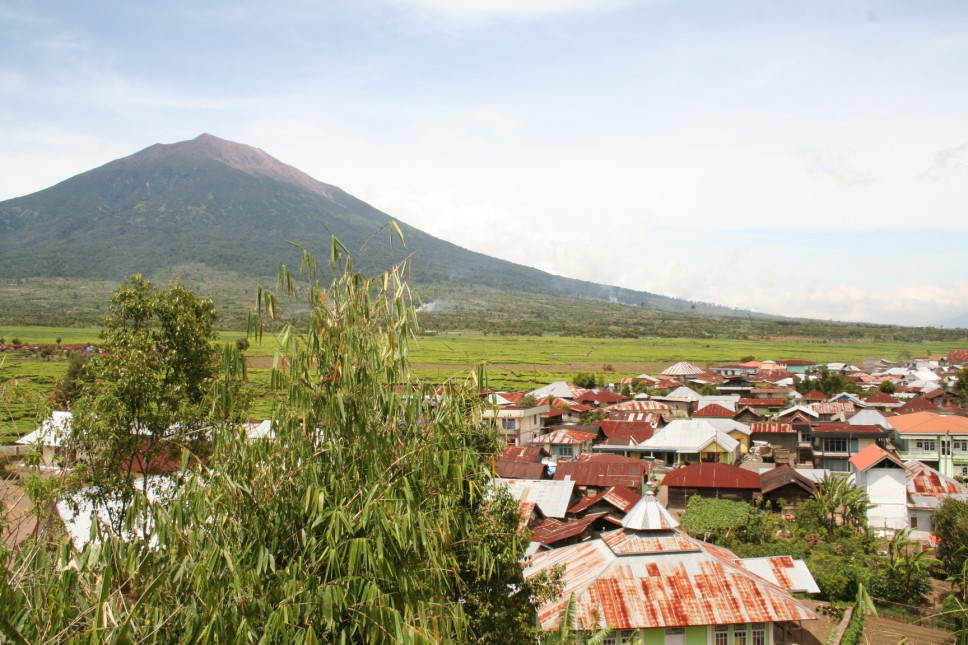
Kersik Tua and Mount Kerinci

Kersik Tua is a village in Kerinci Regency, Jambi Province, on the island of Sumatra in Indonesia. Its chief distinction is its proximity to Kerinci Seblat National Park and Mount Kerinci, making it a popular place for hikers and other travelers to stay and buy provisions.
