= Telun Berasap Falls =

Waterfall in Indonesia

Coordinates: 1°41′20″S 101°20′18″E

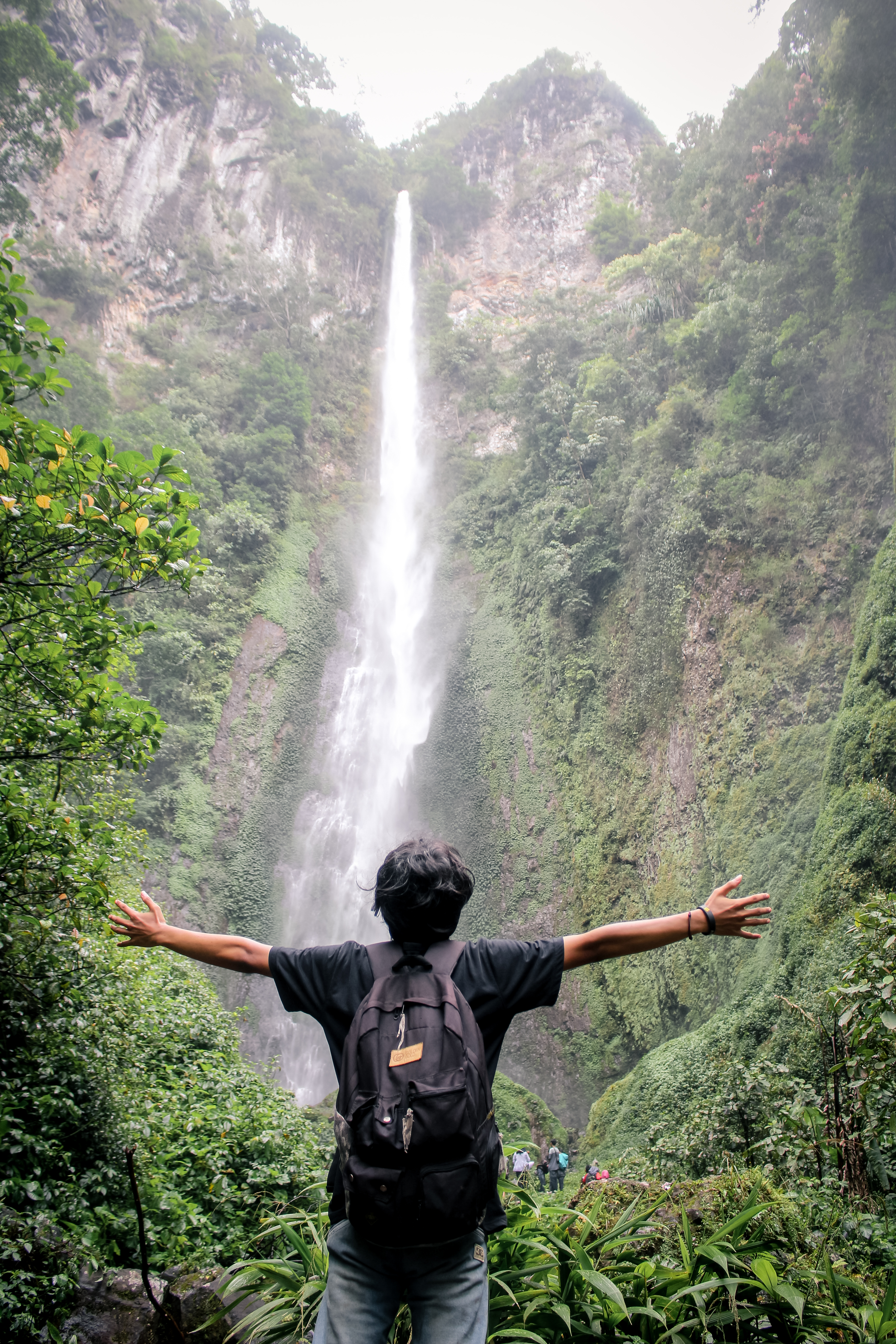
Telun Berasap Falls

Telun Berasap Falls is a waterfall found in Kerinci Regency, Jambi province, Indonesia. Its height is approximately 50 metres (160 ft). The source of water is Telen river, which disgorges around Mount Seven. The immediate source of water is Mount Seven Falls, which flows from Lake Gunung Tujuh atop Mount Seven.

== See also ==
- List of waterfalls
