= Depati Parbo Airport =

Depati Parbo Airport Bandara Depati Parbo
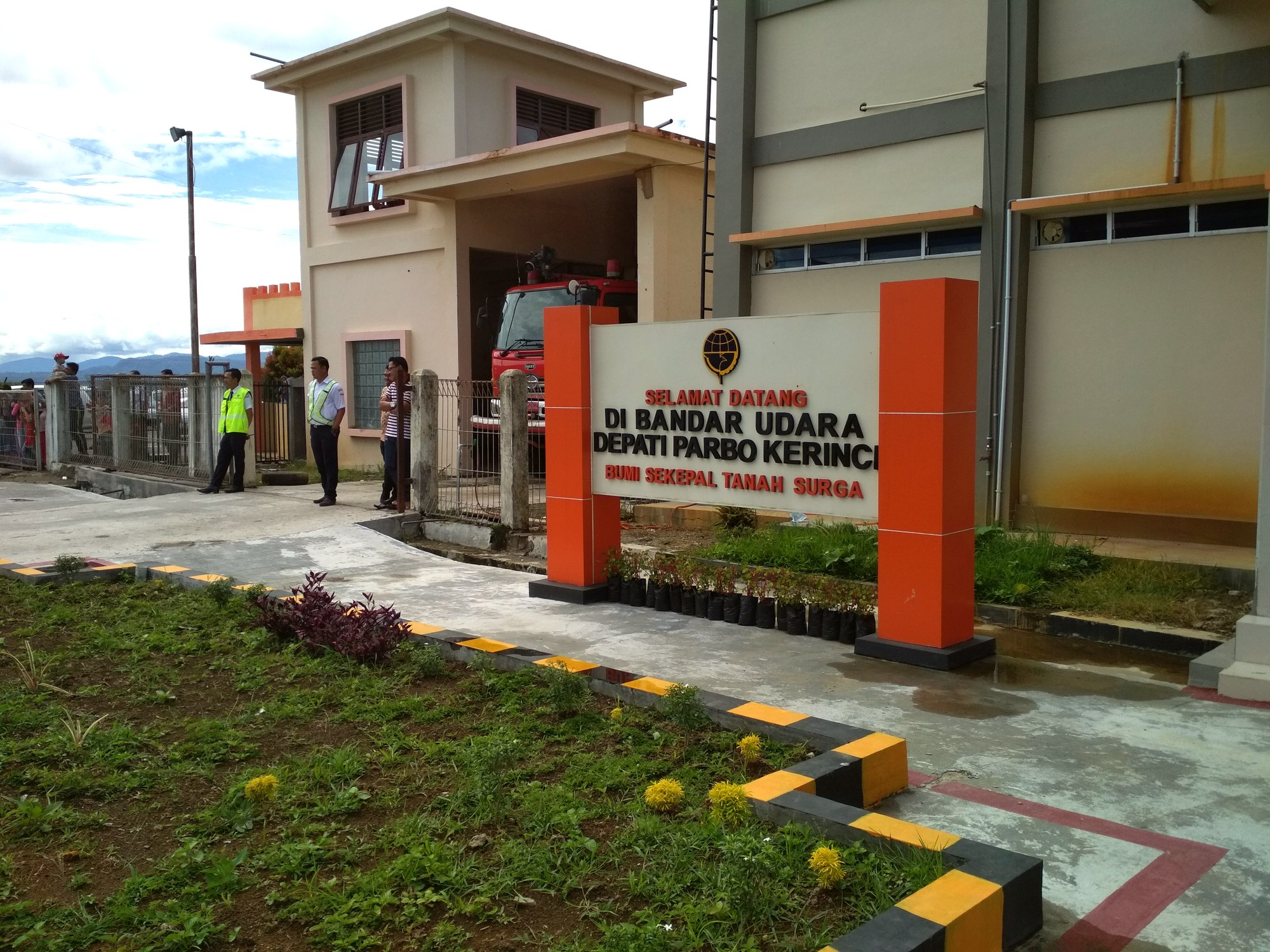
- IATA: KRC; ICAO: WIJI

Summary
- Airport type: Public
- Serves: Sungai Penuh
- Location: Kerinci Regency, Jambi Province, Indonesia
- Time zone: WIB (UTC+07:00)
- Elevation AMSL: 1 m (3.3 ft)
- Coordinates: 02°05′28″S 101°27′46″E

Map
- Location of the airport in Indonesia Sumatra

Runways
Direction	Length		Surface
Direction	m	ft	Surface
12/30	1,800	5,906	Asphalt

Depati Parbo Airport (IATA: KRC, ICAO: WIJI) is located in Kerinci Regency, Jambi Province (part of Sumatra), Indonesia. Negotiations have been underway to further extend the runway to 2,134 by 35 metres (7,001 ft × 115 ft), with a concrete surface.

== Airlines and Destinations ==
Airlines	Destinations
Susi Air	Jambi
Wings Air	Lubuk Linggau, Muara Bungo
