= Kaco =

Kaco may refer to:

- Kaco’ language, an Austro-Asiatic language of Vietnam
- Kaco (drum), a type of shamanistic drum of the Ainu people
- KACO (FM), a radio station licensed to Apache, Oklahoma, United States
- Lake Kaco, Lempur, Jambi, Indonesia
