= Hot Semurup =

Coordinates: 1°59′18″S 101°21′26″E

Hot Semurup is a hot spring attraction located in Air Panas Baru, Air Hangat, Kerinci Regency, Jambi, Indonesia.

Semurup hot spring has an area of 76 square metres (820 sq ft). The spring is heated by volcanic activity. The water is often steaming hot and smells sulfurous.
