= Lake Kaco =

- Danau Kaco
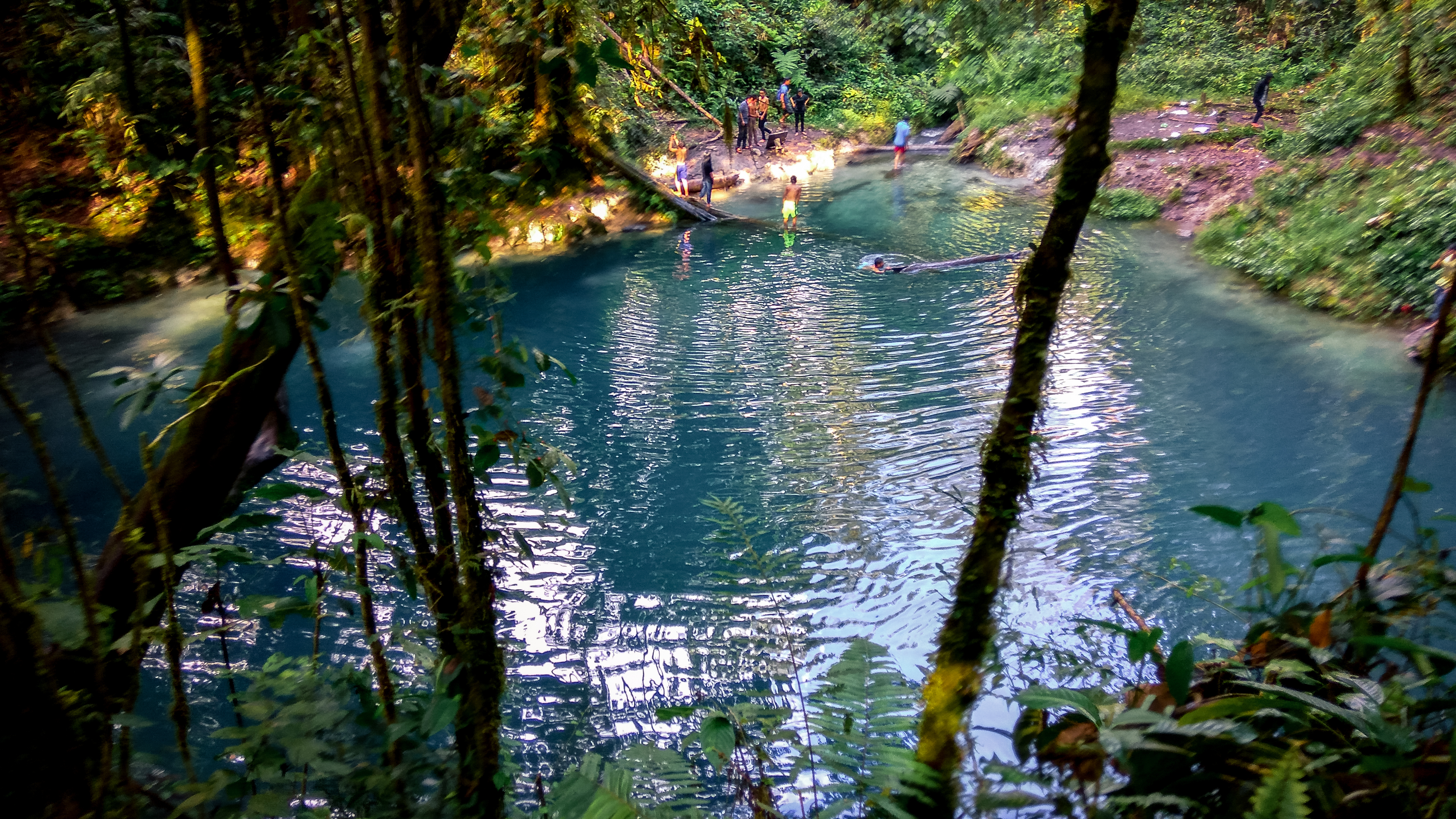
- Lake Kaco, a natural lake with a unique characteristic of its water color, part of Kerinci Seblat National Park

- Location within Indonesia
- Location: Kerinci Regency
- Coordinates: 2°19′36″S 101°32′24″E
- Type: lake
- Part of: Manjunto Selagan basin
- Primary outflows: Batang Manjunto
- Basin countries: Indonesia
- Managing agency: National Park Management Section - Region 1 Kerinci
- Surface area: 90 m^{2} (970 sq ft)
- Average depth: approx. 20 m (66 ft)
- Surface elevation: 1,229 m (4,032 ft)
- Settlements: Dusun Baru Lempur
- Website: tnkerinciseblat.or.id

Lake Kaco is a lake located in the village of Lempur in the Gunung Raya district of Kerinci Regency, Jambi, Indonesia.

== Geology and location ==
The lake is part of the Kerinci Seblat National Park area, located within a rainforest region at an elevation of 1,229 m (4,032 ft), in the Bukit Barisan mountain range. The lake has an area of approximately 90 m^{2} (110 sq yd).

== Hydrology ==
Lake Kaco is a natural lake with the unique characteristic of its watercolor. The water in this lake has a distinct cyan or bluish-green hue that is exceptionally clear and shimmering at night. The deepest point, as estimated by local guides using traditional methods, measures about 20 meters in depth. The water temperature in Lake Kaco tends to be cooler compared to the surrounding area.

The most scientifically plausible explanation suggests that certain mineral contents in the lake's sediments contribute to this cyan coloration. Chemically, the molecular structure of water imparts a natural blue color, which becomes more pronounced with an increase in water volume. Chemical components like calcium carbonate and kaolin may also play a role in giving the bluish-green tint. The natural blue color in this water serves as an indicator of the ecosystem's quality and the condition of the river basin. Lakes with this bluish hue tend to be less impacted by human ecological footprint and are better preserved.

Lakes with such coloration often have fewer populations of aquatic life, including fish, zooplankton, and phytoplankton. Since the mahseer fish (Tor douronensis) is quite common in Lake Kaco, an alternative hypothesis has emerged. Biologically, algae from the chlorophyceae and cyanophyceae groups, along with some diatom organisms, may contribute to the bluish-green color. Some diatoms may also produce a golden shimmer at night. However, further research is needed to gain a deeper understanding of the reasons behind this cyan color and its nighttime shimmer in Lake Kaco.

== See also ==
- Lake Kerinci
- Mount Kerinci
- Sungai Penuh
- Batang Hari River
