= Kerinci Expedition =

Ekspedisi Kerinci
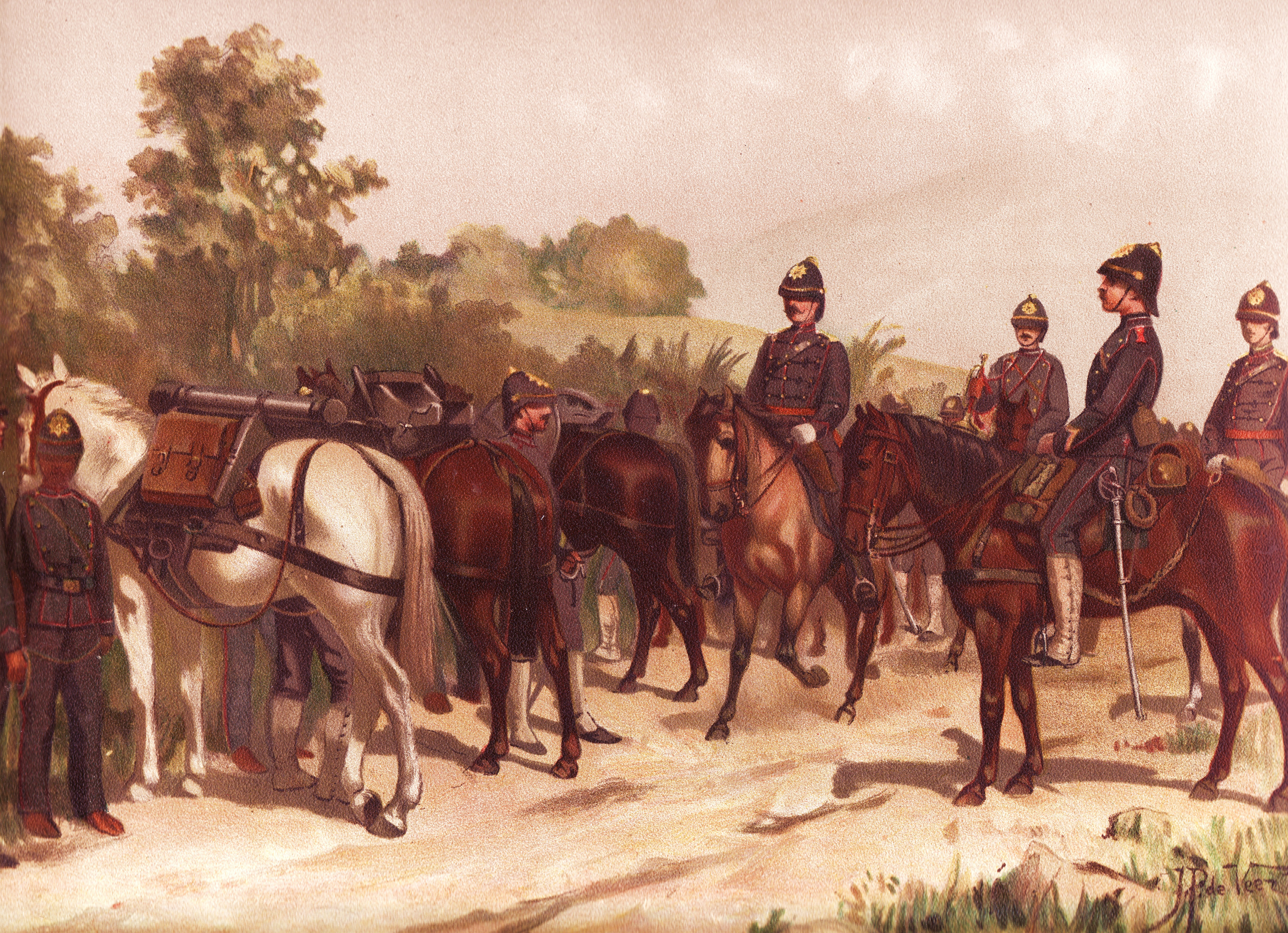
- Mountain artillery unit of the East Indies Army in 1896
Date	1903
Location	Kerinci
Result	Dutch Victory; Exile of Depati Parbo to Ternate

Belligerents
Kerinci tribe	Dutch East Indies

Commanders and leaders
Depati Parbo	Bolmar

Strength
Unknown	500 soldiers

Casualties and losses
At least 300 killed (including civilians)	300 killed

The Kerinci Expedition was a punitive expedition of the Royal Netherlands East Indies Army to Kerinci (then Korintji), on the west coast of Sumatra, from 12 May to 4 September 1903.

== Battle ==
The Dutch entered Kerinci Regency via Mukomuko, Bengkulu in 1900. They followed the Manjuto River and established a post on the summit of Gunung Raya Hill. This action angered the Kerinci people. The first battle between the Kerinci people and the Dutch, led by Depati Parbo, broke out at Manjuto Lempur. The Dutch suffered heavy casualties.

The resulting battle in 1901, with heavy casualties, forced them to abandon their plan to enter Kerinci. However, in October 1901, a group of 120 Dutch troops stationed in Indrapura prepared to attack Kerinci.

In March 1902, a group of 500 Dutch troops under Commander Bolmar landed at Muarosakai, with Tuanku Regen as their guide to Kerinci.

The Dutch attacked three locations in Kerinci Regency: Renah Manjuto, Koto Limau Sering, and Tamiai. Fierce fighting ensued in these three locations, but after capturing Koto Limau Sering, the Dutch forces easily entered the Kerinci Valley.

During the battle on Pulau Tengah, led by renowned clerics Haji Ismail and Haji Husin, warriors from other villages in Kerinci joined in the war. Kerinci history records that the battle in this village was the fiercest and longest (approximately three months). Pulau Tengah was attacked by the Dutch on March 27, 1903, from three directions: to the east: Sanggaran Agung-Jujun; to the north: Batang Merao-Lake Kerinci; and to the west: Semerap-Lempur Danau.

The Sacred Mosque on Pulau Tengah served as a stronghold for the community against the Dutch. The final attack on Pulau Tengah was carried out by the Dutch on August 9-10, 1903, burning Dusun Baru, but the Sacred Mosque escaped fire. The Dutch were able to quell this popular resistance.

Next, Dutch troops attacked Lolo, the headquarters of the Kerinci warlord, Depati Parbo. The battle lasted five days. During this never-ending battle, the Dutch managed to persuade Depati Parbo to hold peace negotiations. During these negotiations, Depati Parbo was captured and subsequently exiled to Ternate, North Maluku, for 25 years.

== Sources ==
- 1906. De expeditie naar Korintji in 1903. uittreksels uit de verslagen der verschillende wapens en diensten met daarnaast enige afzonderlijke bijlagen. Indisch Militair Tijdschrift. Extra Bijlage nummer 17. G. Kolff & Co. Batavia.
