= Kerinci people =

Kerinci Uhang Kinci Uhang Kincai
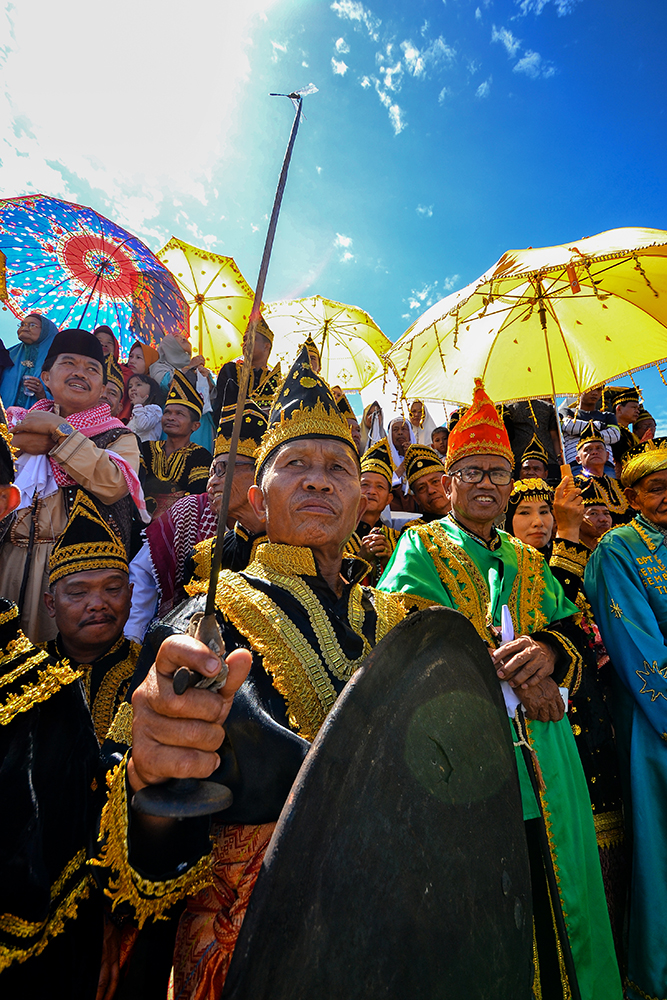

Total population
- 300.000 (1996)

Regions with significant populations
- Kerinci Regency, Jambi; Merangin Regency, Jambi; Sungai Penuh; Bungo Regency; North Sumatera; West Sumatera; Riau; Riau Islands; Bengkulu; South Sumatera; Bangka Belitung Islands; Lampung; Banten; Jakarta; West Java; Kuala Lumpur, Malaysia Selangor, Malaysia Negeri Sembilan, Malaysia

Languages
- Kerinci, Indonesia, Malay, Minangkabau

Religion
- Islam

Related ethnic groups
- Malay, Minangkabau

Kerinci people (Kerinci: Uhang Kincai, Malay: Kerinci or Kerinchi, Minangkabau: Urang Karinci) are an Austronesian ethnic group native to Jambi province specifically in the regencies of Kerinci, Merangin, Bungo and the city of Sungai Penuh. Besides Jambi, Kerinci communities can also be found in neighbouring West Sumatra. In the 19th century, some Kerincis migrated to the Malay Peninsula and today its descendants can be found in several states on the west coast of Peninsular Malaysia. The traditional area of the Kerincis covers an area of around 4,200 km² and with a population of 300,000 people. Topographically Kerinci Regency owns hilly terrain in a row of the Bukit Barisan Range with the highest peak of Mount Kerinci.
