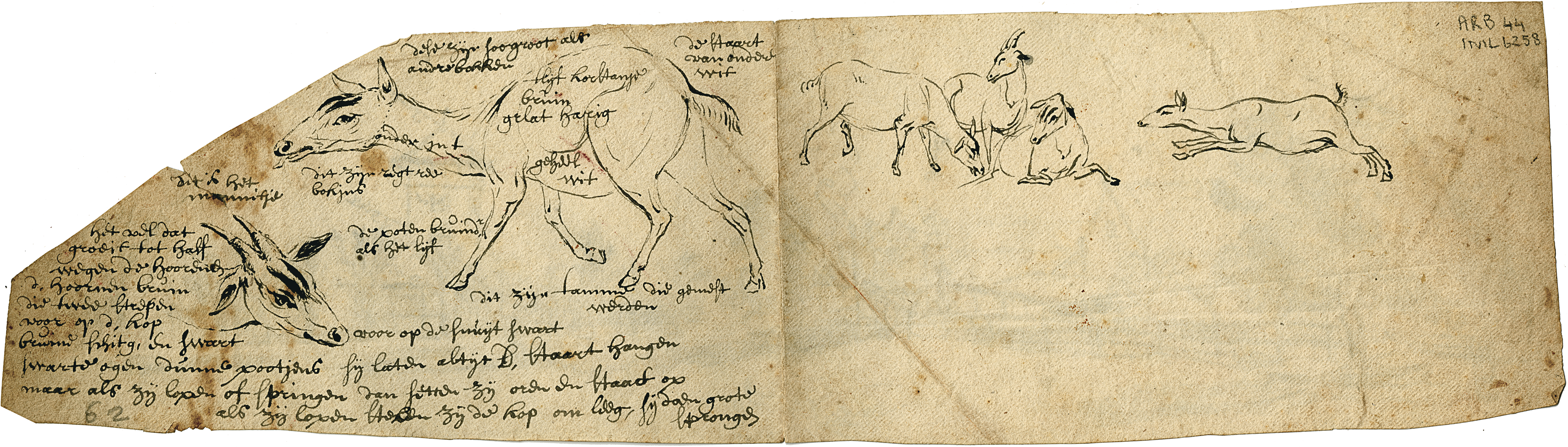

Conservation status
- Data Deficient (IUCN 3.1)

Scientific classification
- Kingdom: Animalia
- Phylum: Chordata
- Class: Mammalia
- Order: Artiodactyla
- Family: Cervidae
- Genus: Muntiacus
- Species: M. muntjak
- Subspecies: M. m. montanus

Trinomial name
- Muntiacus muntjak montanus (Robinson & Kloss, 1918)
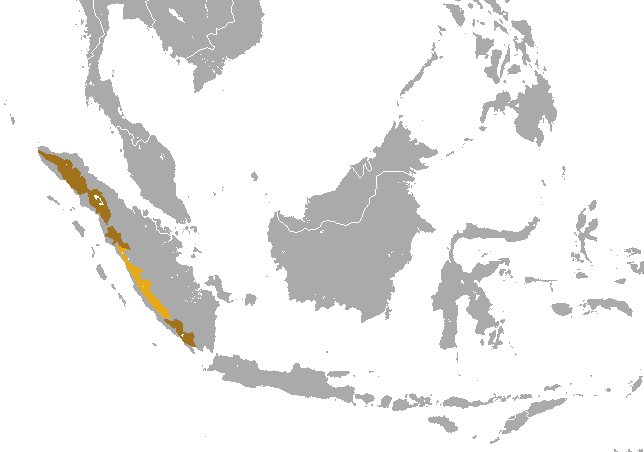
- Sumatran muntjac range

= Sumatran muntjac =

Species of deer

The Sumatran muntjac (Muntiacus muntjak montanus) is a subspecies of Indian muntjac in the deer family which can be the size of a large dog. Discovered in 1914, it had not been sighted since 1930 until one was snared and freed from a hunter's snare in Kerinci Seblat National Park, Sumatra, Indonesia in 2002. Two other Sumatran muntjac have since been photographed in the park. The Sumatran muntjac was placed on the IUCN Red List in 2008, but was listed as Data Deficient, as taxonomic issues are still unresolved (it has been considered either a distinct species, M. montanus, or a subspecies M. muntjak montanus of the common muntjac). The distribution of the taxon is also uncertain and may be more extensive than suggested. It is possible that some previous sightings of the common muntjac in Western Sumatra were the Sumatran muntjac.
