= Osteochilus kerinciensis =

Conservation status
- Data Deficient (IUCN 3.1)

Scientific classification
- Kingdom: Animalia
- Phylum: Chordata
- Class: Actinopterygii
- Order: Cypriniformes
- Family: Cyprinidae
- Genus: Osteochilus
- Species: O. kerinciensis

Binomial name
- Osteochilus kerinciensis Tan & Kottelat, 2009

Species of fish

Osteochilus kerinciensis is a species of cyprinid fish. It is endemic to Sumatra (Indonesia). It is known from the upper reaches of the Batang Hari River basin, including upstream tributaries and highland lakes. The specific name kerinciensis refers to its type locality, Lake Kerinci.

Osteochilus kerinciensis grows to 21 cm (8.3 in) standard length.
