= Kerinci language =

Malayic language spoken in Indonesia

Kerinci
- basê Kinci; basê Kincai
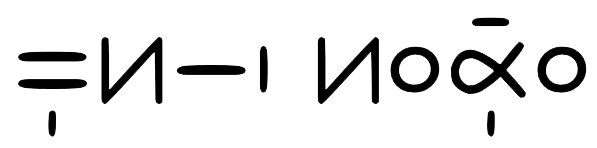
- Suhat incoung, the original script of the Kerinci language
- Pronunciation: [ba.sə kiɲ.t͡ʃai̯]
- Native to: Indonesia (Jambi, West Sumatra, and Bengkulu); Malaysia (Selangor and Negeri Sembilan)
- Region: Sumatra
- Ethnicity: Kerinci
- Native speakers: (254,125 cited Jambi, 2000)
- Language family: Austronesian: Malayo-Polynesian; Malayic; Kerinci
- Dialects: Belui Air Hangat; Danau Kerinci; Gunung Kerinci; Gunung Raya; Pembantu Sungai Tutung; Sitinjau Laut; Sungai Penuh
- Writing system: Latin (Indonesian alphabet); Incung; Jawi

Language codes
- ISO 639-3: kvr
- Glottolog: keri1250
- Linguasphere: 33-AFA-da
- Areas where Kerinci language is a majority Areas where Kerinci language is a minority

Kerinci (basê Kinci or basê Kincai) is an Austronesian language primarily spoken by the Kerinci people in Sungai Penuh and Kerinci Regency, as well as parts of Merangin and Bungo Regency in western Jambi. It is also spoken in several hamlets of Mukomuko Regency in Bengkulu, and by Kerinci diaspora communities in other regions of Indonesia, such as West Sumatra and Java. Outside Indonesia, it is spoken in parts of Negeri Sembilan and Selangor in Malaysia.

As of 2000, the number of Kerinci speakers was estimated at around 250,000. As a Malayo‑Polynesian Malayic language, Kerinci is closely related to Minangkabau and Jambi Malay.

Kerinci shows substantial internal diversity, with approximately 130 sub‑dialects grouped into seven main dialects: Gunung Raya, Danau Kerinci, Sitinjau Laut, Sungai Penuh, Pembantu Sungai Tutung, Belui Air Hangat, and Gunung Kerinci. Dialectometric comparisons among these seven dialects show lexical differences of roughly 51%–65.5%. By comparison, differences between Kerinci and neighboring Bengkulu and Minangkabau are around 81%–100%.

== Classification ==
The Kerinci language is one of the many varieties of the Malayic languages. Linguists believe that the Malay language, one of the varieties of the Malayic languages, originally derived from Proto-Malayic, which was spoken in the area stretching from West Kalimantan to the northern coast of Brunei around 1000 BCE. Its ancestor, Proto-Malayo-Polynesian, is believed to have originated from Proto-Austronesian, which split around 2000 BCE due to the large-scale expansion of the Austronesian people into Maritime Southeast Asia from the island of Taiwan.

The Kerinci language is a member of the Austronesian language family, which encompasses various languages in Southeast Asia, the Pacific Ocean, and Madagascar, as well as some languages in mainland Asia. Uniquely, the Kerinci language also shares some phonemes with Austroasiatic languages. Meanwhile, Malagasy, Filipino, the indigenous languages of Taiwan, and Māori are also members of the Austronesian language family. Although each language in this family is not mutually intelligible, their similarities are quite striking. Many basic words have remained almost unchanged from their common ancestor, Proto-Austronesian. There are numerous cognates found in basic words for kinship, health, body parts, and common animals. Even the words for numbers exhibit a remarkable level of similarity.

== Geographic distribution and usage ==
The Kerinci language is predominantly spoken by the Kerinci people who inhabit the Kerinci highlands and surrounding areas, particularly around Kerinci Seblat National Park. Administratively, these areas are within the city of Sungai Penuh and Kerinci Regency, as well as parts of Merangin and Bungo regencies in Jambi. In Kerinci Regency, it is spoken in Pengasih Lama Village (Bukitkerman District); the villages of Koto Tuo Ujung Pasir and Seleman (Danau Kerinci District); Hiang Tinggi Village (Sitinjau Laut District); the villages of Koto Lebu and Koto Lolo (Pondong Tinggi District); Sungaiabu Village (Kerinci District); Belui Village (Air Hangat Timur District); and the villages of Mukai Tinggi and Sung Betung Ilir (Gunung Kerinci District). The language is also used in small parts of the neighboring province of Bengkulu, specifically in Mukomuko Regency. Additionally, Kerinci people have migrated to the Malay Peninsula since the 19th century. In Malaysia, the Kerinci language is most widespread on the west coast of the peninsula—including Selangor, Kuala Lumpur, Perak, Negeri Sembilan, and Johor—owing to proximity to Sumatra. However, in Malaysia its status is threatened by gradual assimilation and acculturation into local language and culture, especially among the Malay community.

In the Kerinci highlands, Kerinci serves as the predominant means of daily communication across informal and formal settings, though it is used mainly in informal contexts. Indonesian functions as the lingua franca in government, education, and interethnic communication. As Indonesian usage expands with increasing educational opportunities, code‑switching between Kerinci and Indonesian has become commonplace.

The Kerinci language holds significant importance for its speakers in Kerinci Regency and the city of Sungai Penuh in Jambi, and it remains a key element of local culture. Amid growing multilingualism and multiethnic migration from other parts of Indonesia, Kerinci speakers face challenges in preserving language integrity, and increased exposure to other languages has gradually influenced Kerinci usage. Consequently, the government has undertaken efforts to support Kerinci. In Sungai Penuh, Kerinci language courses have been made compulsory in the school curriculum. The Jambi provincial government has also initiated teacher‑training programs to enhance pedagogy and promote Kerinci, including instruction in writing and reading using the Incung script, composing and reciting Kerinci poetry, storytelling, public speaking, short‑story writing, traditional singing, and solo comedic performance—all conducted in Kerinci.

== Dialects ==
The number of dialects of the Kerinci language is debatable, as the subvarieties of the language have not been fully defined due to limited research on the geographic boundaries of the Kerinci region. According to Anwar et al. (1984), the Kerinci language is classified into three major dialect groups: the Upper Kerinci dialect (Kerinci Hulu), the Middle Kerinci dialect (Kerinci Tengah), and the Lower Kerinci dialect (Kerinci Hilir). In his research report, Usman (1990) suggests there are two dialects in the Kerinci language—the "i" dialect and the "ai" dialect—each with its own subvarieties. However, Amirruddin et al. (2003) state that there are approximately 177 dialects in the Kerinci language and that the number corresponds to the number of villages (dusun) in Kerinci Regency.

The Indonesian Agency for Language Development and Cultivation identifies approximately 130 dialects of the Kerinci language, comprising seven major dialects: Gunung Raya, Danau Kerinci, Sitinjau Laut, Sungai Penuh, Pembantu Sungai Tutung, Air Hangat, and Gunung Kerinci. The Gunung Raya dialect is spoken in Pengasih Lama Village in Bukitkerman District. The Danau Kerinci dialect is spoken in Koto Tuo Ujung Pasir and Seleman villages in Danau Kerinci District. The Sitinjau Laut dialect is spoken in Hiang Tinggi Village in Sitinjau Laut District. The Sungai Penuh dialect is spoken in Koto Lebu and Koto Lolo villages in Pondong Tinggi District. The Pembantu Sungai Tutung dialect is spoken in Sungaiabu Village in Kerinci District. The Belui Air Hangat dialect is spoken in Belui Village in Air Hangat Timur District. The Gunung Kerinci dialect is spoken in Mukai Tinggi and Sung Betung Ilir villages in Gunung Kerinci District.

Kerinci dialects can differ greatly between villages even when they are very close, such as Tanah Kampung, Kemantan, and Dusun Baru, which are separated only by a river. Administratively, these three villages belong to different districts and regencies. Dusun Baru Lempur and Kemantan are located in Kerinci Regency but in different districts, while Tanah Kampung is part of Sungai Penuh. Although part of Sungai Penuh, the inhabitants of Tanah Kampung use a distinct variety, the Tanah Kampung dialect. Kemantan Raya is in Air Hangat Timur District (Kerinci Regency), where the community uses the Tanah Kemantan dialect. Meanwhile, Dusun Baru Lempur is in Gunung Raya District (Kerinci Regency), and its inhabitants use the Dusun Baru dialect. This variety is not to be confused with another dialect spoken in Dusun Baru near the town centre of Sungai Penuh. Adjacent to the latter Dusun Baru speech area, the Sungai Penuh dialect is spoken, separated by a market from Pondok Tinggi. In turn, the Koto Renah dialect is spoken only a market away from Pondok Tinggi, while Koto Keras is almost contiguous with Koto Renah. Kerinci exhibits both phonological and lexical differences across dialects; however, the dialects are generally mutually intelligible. One example of phonological variation involves the vowel [a] in word‑final position before [t]: in Sungai Penuh, [a] changes to [e]; in Pondok Tinggi, it becomes [uə]; in Lempur and Semurup, it remains [a]; and in Dusun Baru, it changes to [o]. An illustration of phonological distinctions across Kerinci dialects can be observed in the pronunciation of the word "girl": in the Sungai Penuh dialect it may be /gadɔyh/ or /gadeih/; in Tanjung Pauh, /gadeh/ or /gadyh/; and in Koto Keras, /gaduh/ or /gadi/.

Dialectal variation in Kerinci (Note: Each Malay item corresponds to two Kerinci forms: the absolute and oblique forms (on their usage, see #Phrasal alternation). The first form shown is the absolute form; the second is the oblique form.)
Standard Malay	Pondok Tinggi	Koto Renah	Koto Keras	Sungai Penuh	Dusun Baru	Rawang	Sungai Deras	Tanjung Pauh Mudik
gəlas 'glass'	gəloah gəleh	gəloʌh gəleh	gəlɔh gəleh	gəlɛh gəlɛih	gəloah gəlɛh	gəlaoh gəlɛh	gəlouh gəlejh	glih glɨjh
duri 'thorn'	duhoi duhi	duhui duhi	duhu duhi	duhoi duhi	duhui duhi	duhiw duhɛw	duhuh duhi	duhʌe duhɨj
batu 'stone'	bateu batu	bati batu	batiu batu	bateu batu	batiu batu	batɛw batiw	bati batu	batəo batɨw

In addition, the Kerinci language spoken in Malaysia has diverged from its original form and is no longer spoken as it is by native Kerinci speakers in Indonesia. In Malaysia, Kerinci has been significantly influenced by local languages such as Malay, and thus differs from the variety spoken in the Kerinci region of Jambi.

== Phonology ==
=== Vowels ===
The table below illustrates the vowel inventories of the Pondok Tinggi dialect of Kerinci:

Pondok Tinggi vowels
	Front	Central	Back
Close	i		u
Mid	e	ə	o
Open		a	

Pondok Tinggi /e/ and /o/ in closed syllables have the allophones [ɛ] and [ɔ], respectively. The latter two vowels, however, are phonemic in the Sungai Penuh dialect.

Sungai Penuh vowels
	Front	Central	Back
Close	i		u
Mid	e	ə	o
Open‑mid	ɛ		ɔ
Open		a	

Pondok Tinggi Kerinci has a rich inventory of diphthongs. Ernanda lists a total of 12 diphthongs for the Pondok Tinggi dialect, given in the table below according to whether the sequences are opening or closing (i.e., whether they are moving towards open/low vowels or closed/high vowels). Diphthongs /ia/ and /ao/ are only found in open syllables.

Pondok Tinggi diphthongs
		Open syllable	Closed syllable
Opening	ia	iɟia 'nothing'	
Opening	ua	ladua 'field.A' ɟalua 'road.A'	gaguah 'handsome.A' banuaʔ 'to give birth.A'
Opening	oa	dəroa 'scattered.A' guloa 'dish.A'	ɟəloah 'clear.A' gəloah 'glass.A'
Opening	ea	buŋea 'flower.A' dadea 'chest.A'	təgeaʔ 'well‑built.A' deaʔ 'TAG'
Closing	ai	matai 'to die.A' cucai 'to wash.A'	laŋaiʔ 'sky.A' sihaih 'betel.A'
Closing	au	kalau 'necklace.A' cucau 'grandchild.A'	ambauʔ 'hair.A' kukauh 'firm.A'
Closing	ae	pakae 'to wear.A' lantae 'floor.A'	kapaeh 'cotton.A' kambaeʔ 'goat.A'
Closing	ao	warnao 'colour.A' ɲatao 'real.A'	
Closing	eu	abeu 'ash.A' sudeu 'spoon.A'	tədeuh 'shaded.A' kəɟeuʔ 'to surprise.A'
Closing	ei	cucei 'to wash.O' pikei 'to think.O'	iteiʔ 'duck.O' puteih 'white.O'
Closing	oi	ganɟoi 'odd.A' guloi 'to roll on.A'	baloiʔ 'to come back.A' bətoih 'calf.A'
Closing	ou	kayou 'wood.O' tipou 'to cheat.O'	kukouh 'firm.O' maŋkouʔ 'bowl.O'

Sungai Penuh dialect has a fewer inventory of contrastive diphthongs, with a total of 7.

Sungai Penuh diphthongs
		Open syllable	Closed syllable
Closing	ei	bibei 'lips.A'	kəleih 'to see.A'
Closing	eu	buceu 'to leak.A'	tubeuh 'body.A'
Closing	ɛu	abɛu 'ashes.A'	daɛuŋ 'leaf.A'
Closing	ɔi	bəhɔi 'to give.A'	gigɔiʔ 'to bite.A'
Closing	ou	iɟou 'green.O'	pəlouʔ 'to embrace.O'
Closing	ai	kakai 'foot.A'	kulaiʔ 'skin.A'
Closing	au	kutau 'louse.A'	pəhauʔ 'belly.A'

All diphthongs appear only in final syllables. Other Kerinci dialects may distinguish different sets of vowel phonemes; cf. Tanjung Pauh Mudik with 9 plain vowels and 7 diphthongs, or Semerap with 7–8 plain vowels (Note: The phonemic status of Semerap schwa is uncertain.) and 8 diphthongs.

=== Consonants ===
There are nineteen consonants in Pondok Tinggi Kerinci. The table below illustrates the consonant inventory of Pondok Tinggi:

Pondok Tinggi consonants
		Labial	Alveolar	Dental / Alveolar	Palatal	Velar	Glottal
Plosive	voiceless	p	t̪	c	k	ʔ	
Plosive	voiced	b	d	ɟ	ɡ		
Nasal		m	n	ɲ	ŋ		
Fricative			s			h	
Lateral			l				
Trill			r				
Approximant		w		j ⟨y⟩			

Sungai Penuh consonant inventory is identical to that of Pondok Tinggi with the addition of /z/, which is a native phoneme (not borrowed) historically derived from medial /ŋs/ cluster, cf. Standard Malay kelongsong vs. Sungai Penuh kaluzɔŋ/kaluzon 'wrapper'.

=== Morphophonology ===
Within a word, the presence of a voiced obstruent (/b/, /d/, /ɟ/, or /ɡ/) that is not preceded by a homorganic nasal consonant alters its final rime. Words with a non‑prenasalized voiced obstruent are labeled "G‑words", while those that do not have such an obstruent are called "K‑words". This distinction is apparent in words that historically share the same final rimes, as shown in the table below (Pondok Tinggi examples).

K‑words and G‑words
Historical rimes	K‑words	G‑words
*‑i	kakai / kakei 'leg'	dakoi / daki 'to climb'
*‑u	malau / malou 'shy'	buleu / bulu 'fur'
*‑ah	pindah / pindoh 'to move'	gunduah / gundoh 'depressed'

As seen above, final vocalic rimes in Pondok Tinggi G‑words are generally more closed (higher) than those in K‑words. Historical *‑i corresponds to modern Pondok Tinggi ‑ai/‑ei in K‑words and ‑oi/‑i in G‑words, while historical *‑u corresponds to ‑au/‑ou in K‑words and ‑eu/‑u in G‑words. The word pindah/pindoh, while containing a voiced obstruent, is not counted as a G‑word since the obstruent is preceded by a homorganic nasal. By contrast, gunduah/gundoh includes another voiced obstruent not in a nasal‑obstruent sequence, so it still undergoes the G‑word change.

This process is still productive in modern Pondok Tinggi Kerinci. For example, if the passive prefix di‑ (which contains a voiced obstruent) is attached to a K‑word, the word becomes a G‑word and its final rime changes—unless the initial consonant of the root is also an obstruent, which blocks the change.

ambaiɁ/ambeiɁ {'to take'} → diamboiɁ/diambiɁ {'be taken'}
ihan/ihin {'to accompany'} → diihon/diihin {'be along with s.o.'}
paŋkau/paŋkou {'to hold'} → dipaŋkau/dipaŋkou {'be held'}

If a G‑word loses its voiced obstruent due to prefixation, it reverts to a K‑word and its final rime changes accordingly. This happens, for example, when the active prefix N‑ alters the initial obstruent of a root to a homorganic nasal. (Note: Following usual practice in Malay linguistics, both root forms and prefixed active forms are glossed as infinitives.)

bəŋoih/bəŋih → məŋaih/məŋeih {'to be angry at'}
dakoi/daki → nakai/nakei {'to climb'}

=== Truncation ===
Words in various Kerinci dialects, including Pondok Tinggi and Sungai Penuh, exhibit phonologically truncated or clipped forms that are both semantically and grammatically interchangeable with their full forms. This contrasts with truncation in other traditional Malayic lects, which generally affects only certain classes of words (e.g., aspect markers) or marks certain grammatical functions (e.g., Jambi Malay vocative mᵇɪŋ 'hey goat!' from kamᵇɪŋ 'goat'). Compare the following examples from Sungai Penuh, where both truncated and full forms have the same glosses:

pəgɔi → gɔi {'to go'}
ləzɛ → zɛ {'clean'}

In Pondok Tinggi, truncation may affect most parts of speech and all kinds of sounds. Ernanda observes that it generally occurs in unstressed syllables, frequently deleting the initial syllable or its onset (particularly if bilabial). It can occur at the phrasal level, and for longer words there is a tendency to elide the word‑medial syllable. Truncation also interacts with the K‑/G‑word alternation: K‑words that have become G‑words via the addition of a voiced obstruent from prefixation do not revert to their original forms when truncated.

di- LOC (Note: Homophonic with the passive prefix.) + umah {'house.A'} → diumuah {'at home'} → dumuah → umuah
bar- STAT + anaʔ {'child.A'} → baranuaʔ {'to give birth'} → banuaʔ → anuaʔ

In the dialect of Tanjung Pauh Mudik, the truncated monosyllabic forms are very common in naturalistic speech, to the point that the full forms found in the oral literary register (such as that of the kunaung) are considered archaic by its speakers.

== Grammar ==
=== Phrasal alternation ===
Many Kerinci lexemes exhibit phrasal alternation between an absolute (A) form and an oblique (O) form. In general terms, the absolute form appears in citation and prosodic/phrase‑final contexts, while the oblique form surfaces in non‑final or tightly bound phrasal environments (e.g., within noun phrases before modifiers/determiners). The alternation is typically realized through changes in the rime (vowel quality/height and, in some cases, coda), and interacts with other morphophonological processes described below.

Absolute–oblique pairs (Pondok Tinggi)
Lemma (gloss)	Absolute (A)	Oblique (O)
'glass'	gəloah	gəleh
'thorn'	duhoi	duhi
'stone'	bateu	batu

Short phrases illustrate the distributional contrast (A in citation/final, O in tighter phrasal contexts); the exact conditioning may vary across Kerinci isolects:

gəloah {} {'glass.A'} (citation/final)
gəleh itoh {'that glass.O'} {}

=== Affixes ===
The Kerinci language has a number of affixes that can join with a base word to form an affixed word. There are three types of affixes in Kerinci: prefixes, suffixes, and infixes. Similar to other Malayic languages, Kerinci words are composed of a root or a root plus derivational affixes. The root is the primary lexical unit of a word and is usually bisyllabic, of the shape CV(C)CV(C). Affixes are "glued" onto roots (which are either nouns or verbs) to alter or expand the primary meaning associated with a given root, effectively generating new words.

==== Prefixes ====
The prefixes commonly used in Kerinci include ba-, di-, N-, ta-, pa-, ma-, ka-, and sa-. Examples of the prefix ba-:

- ba- + lahai 'run' → balahoi 'to be running'
- ba- + tanak 'livestock' → batanak 'to raise livestock'
- ba- + buloy 'fur' → babuloy 'furry'
- ba- + sataw 'one' → basataw 'unite'

Examples of the prefix di-:

- di- + bli 'buy' → dibli 'be bought'
- di- + bene 'right' → dibene 'be fixed'
- di- + rusak 'damage' → dirusak 'be damaged'
- di- + saain 'rival' → disaain 'be rivaled'

Examples of the prefix N-:

- N- + udud 'cigarette' → ngudud 'to smoke'
- N- + buka 'open' → mukak 'to open'
- N- + antak 'drop, send' → ngantak 'to drop off'
- N- + gawe 'do' → ngawe 'to do'

Examples of the prefix ta-:

- ta- + panggang 'burn' → tapanggang 'burnt'
- ta- + panjang 'long' → tapanjang 'longest'
- ta- + pandak 'short' → tapandak 'shortest'
- ta- + lemak 'delicious' → talemak 'most delicious'

Examples of the prefix pa-:

- pa- + tinggay 'tall' → patinggay 'make taller'
- pa- + mace 'read' → pamace 'reader'
- pa- + minan 'drink' → paminan 'drinker'
- pa- + malayh 'lazy' → pamalayh 'lazy person'

Examples of the prefix ma-:

- ma- + lumpak 'jump' → malumpak 'to jump'
- ma- + pahalawh 'smoothen' → mapahalawh 'to smoothen'
- ma- + rapak 'get close' → marapak 'to get close'
- ma- + inak 'remember' → mainak 'to remember'

Examples of the prefix ka-:

- ka- + lapo 'hungry' → kalapo 'feeling hungry'
- ka- + dingin 'cold' → kadingin 'feeling cold'
- ka- + ragun 'doubtful' → karagun 'feeling doubtful'
- ka- + teih 'up' → kateih 'upstairs'

Examples of the prefix sa-:

- sa- + ilaêk 'good' → sailaêk 'as good as'
- sa- + dusen 'hamlet' → sadusen 'entire hamlet'
- sa- + paneh 'hot' → sapaneh 'as hot as'
- sa- + gantang 'bushel' → sagantang 'a bushel'

==== Suffixes ====
In Kerinci, there is only one suffix, -lah. Examples of -lah (suffix bolded):

- Kainan**lah** jeleh‑jeleh sebelum ngambik kaputusan. 'Think calmly before making a decision'
- Dateng**lah** sakalai‑sakalai kumah kamai. 'Come to our house once in a while'
- Biua woe**lah** nyo nangaih luo kamar. 'Just let her cry outside the room'
- Mamok kamai ie**lah** gepeuk nga gdon tinggai. 'Our uncle is fat and tall'

==== Infixes ====
There is only one infix in Kerinci, -ar-. Examples (infix bolded):

- **-ar-** + ayei 'water' → barayei 'watery'
- **-ar-** + agi 'yeast' → baragi 'yeasty'
- **-ar-** + ameh 'gold' → barameh 'golden'
- **-ar-** + adeik 'younger sibling' → baradeik 'have a younger sibling'

=== Reduplication ===
Reduplication in Kerinci can be divided into noun, verb, adjective, and numeral reduplication.

Verb reduplication

- Repetitive action: maco‑maco 'to skim through'; manjat‑manjat 'to climb around'; aloy‑aloy 'to look around'
- Doing something with enjoyment: minan‑minan 'to drink casually'; masak‑masak 'to cook casually'; tidew‑tidew 'to sleep casually'
- Mutual action: batangoyh‑tangoyh 'to cry together'; baragoyh‑ragoyh 'to share together'

Noun reduplication

- Plurality ('many'): anak‑anak 'kids'; gloyh‑gloyh 'glasses'; pisan‑pisan 'bananas'
- Resemblance ('like, resembling'): kudow‑kudow 'horse‑like'; umoh‑umoh 'house‑like'

Adjective reduplication

- Plural/intensifying: gduê‑gduê 'very large'; panja‑panja 'very long'; putaêh‑putaêh 'very white'
- Atmosphere: bagduê‑gduê 'on a large scale'
- Condition/state: sakayk‑sakayk 'frequently sick'; payah‑payah 'persistently difficult'; pnak‑pnak 'continuously exhausted'

Numeral reduplication

- Formation/grouping: tigeê‑tigeê 'three‑by‑three'; dueê‑dueê 'two‑by‑two'

=== Nouns ===
In Kerinci, nouns can be divided into basic nouns, inflectional nouns, and derivative nouns.

Basic nouns (standalone, unmodified) can serve as subject or object:

- apuêk mley bajew 'dad is buying clothes'
- nyo makan pisa 'he is eating a banana'
- anok toh gadoyh 'that child is a girl'
- kakak minum ubuêk 'elder sibling is drinking medicine'

Inflectional nouns arise when a basic noun undergoes phoneme changes due to modification:

- pisa dalon pingga 'banana on a plate'
- pisan kunan toh dalon pingga 'that yellow banana is on a plate'
- jawow sitow 'cow over there'
- jawi putaêh sitow 'that white cow over there'

Derivative nouns are formed with the prefix pa- plus nouns, verbs, or adjectives:

- pa- + tani 'farm' → patani 'farmer'
- pa- + daguê 'trade' → padaguê 'merchant; trader'
- pa- + tulayh 'writer' → patulayh 'writer'
- pa- + baceê 'read' → pabaceê 'reader'

Pluralization of nouns can be expressed by reduplication or numerals:

- sawoh‑sawoh 'lots of farms'; umah‑umah 'lots of houses'
- duwo uha 'two people'; tujuh umoh 'seven houses'

=== Verbs ===
Verbs are words that denote actions, e.g., binen 'drink', tidew 'sleep', baceê 'read', tulayh 'write', agoyh 'give'. By form, verbs are divided into basic, inflectional, and derivative verbs.

Basic verbs (often imperative):

- tulayhlah 'write it'; baceêlah 'read it'; agoylah 'give it'; tidewlah 'go sleep'

Inflectional verbs are basic verbs that become intransitive/transitive via prefixation (phoneme changes occur):

- nyo ntulayh 'he is writing'
- nyo manjak 'he is climbing'
- nyo macaê 'he is reading'

Derivative verbs originate from the combination of N-, ma-, ba-, di-, or pa- with nouns, adjectives, or numerals:

- mangkao 'to hack using a hoe'
- babaoêk 'to get close with each other'
- nakawk 'to scare'
- malemah 'to weaken'

=== Adjectives ===
By form, adjectives are divided into basic and inflected adjectives; by function, they can be attributive or predicative. Adjectives can be modified by items such as nya 'the ... one/so ...', sanat/liwak 'very', laboyh 'more', palin 'most', samo 'same'.

Basic adjectives with modifiers:

- ita nya 'so black'; tingay nya 'so tall'; nya pandak 'the short one'; lebih tinggay 'taller'; nya barsoyh 'the clean one'; samo brot 'same weight'

Inflected adjectives (phonemic change with intensifiers sangat/liwak 'very'):

- sangat itan 'very black'; sangat bersih 'very clean'; liwak pande 'very short'; liwak tinggay 'very tall'

=== Numerals ===
Numerals in Kerinci, as in standard Indonesian, are divided into definite and indefinite types.

Definite numerals (specific quantities):

- sataw 'one'; dueê 'two'; mpak 'four'; limao 'five'; limo pulawh 'fifty'; limo ratawh 'five hundred'

Indefinite numerals (non‑specific quantities):

- banyuêk 'many'; dikoyk 'few; little'

Base numerals combine with pulawh 'tens', ratawh 'hundreds', ribu 'thousands', jutea 'millions':

- sapulawh 'ten'; duwo ratawh 'two hundred'; nan ribu 'six thousand'; sajuta 'one million'

Cardinal numerals can undergo reduplication:

- sataw‑sataw 'one by one'; dueê‑dueê 'two by two'; tigeê‑tigeê 'three by three'; na‑na 'six by six'

Numerals can also take the prefix pa-:

- padueê 'to make into two'; patigeê 'to make into three'; pampak 'to make into four'; pabanyuêk 'to make into many'

=== Pronouns ===
Personal pronouns include:

- First person: akaw 'I'; kamay, kitao 'we' - Second person (age/status‑sensitive): mpao 'you (male, younger)', kaaw 'you (female, younger)', ikao 'you (same age)', kayao 'you (older)'

 - Kin/status refinements: twao 'eldest sibling', twaruwao 'eldest uncle', taruwao 'eldest aunt'; tngah 'second eldest sibling', twarengah 'second eldest uncle', tarengah 'second eldest aunt'; nsaw 'youngest (family)', twansaw 'youngest uncle', tansaw 'youngest aunt'

- Third person: no 'he/she'; diyuê 'he/she (respectful)'; uha 'they'

Interrogatives: apo 'what'; sapo 'who'

Demonstratives (objects): itoh 'that'; ineh 'this'

== Vocabulary ==
The Kerinci language has extensively borrowed words from other languages, particularly Minangkabau and Indonesian. Indonesian is the national language of Indonesia and serves as the language of communication in official settings, such as government institutions and schools. As education levels rise, there is greater exposure to Indonesian, resulting in Kerinci increasingly absorbing loanwords from Indonesian. The significant number of loanwords from Minangkabau is due to historical contact between Kerinci and Minangkabau speakers. These two languages are spoken in contiguous areas, and from the beginning until now, many people from West Sumatra have migrated to Kerinci to establish businesses, work, and even marry native Kerinci speakers. Additionally, Minangkabau is commonly used in Sungai Penuh, the central trade hub in Kerinci. Almost all shopkeepers in Sungai Penuh speak Minangkabau. Lastly, Kerinci is also related to Jambi Malay, which serves as the lingua franca in eastern Jambi. It is estimated that up to 80% of Kerinci terms have similarity with Jambi Malay.

A small number of Kerinci terms have also been influenced by Dutch, with words like uto "car", derived from Dutch auto, and potlot "pencil", derived from Dutch potlood.

Below are examples of commonly used Kerinci words along with their Indonesian and English translations:

=== Numerals ===
Number	Kerinci	Indonesian	English
1	sataw	satu	one
2	dueê, duwo	dua	two
3	tigo	tiga	three
4	mpak	empat	four
5	limo, limao	lima	five
6	na, nan	enam	six
7	tujeuh	tujuh	seven
8	salapan, lapan	delapan	eight
9	sambilan	sembilan	nine
10	sapulawh	sepuluh	ten
11	sabloih	sebelas	eleven
20	duwo pulawh	dua puluh	twenty
50	limo pulawh	lima puluh	fifty
100	saratewh	seratus	one hundred
500	limo ratewh	lima ratus	five hundred
1,000	saribu	seribu	one thousand
5,000	limo ribu	lima ribu	five thousand
100,000	saratewh ribu	seratus ribu	one hundred thousand
1,000,000	sajuta, sataw juta	sejuta, satu juta	one million

=== Directions ===
Kerinci	Indonesian	English
ineh	ini	this
itoh	itu	that
(di) siney	(di) sini	here
(di) sitow	(di) situ	there
kahey	ke sini	go/toward here
kiyon	ke situ	go/toward there
kidan	kiri	left
kanan	kanan	right
lateh	atas	up
bawah	bawah	down
hulu	utara	north
hilir	selatan	south
muare	timur	east
mudik	barat	west

=== Personal pronouns ===
Kerinci	Indonesian	English
akaw, kaw	aku, saya	I, me
mpao	dia	he (younger than speaker)
kaaw	dia	she (younger than speaker)
ikao	dia	he/she (same age as speaker)
kayao	dia	he/she (older than speaker)
no, nya	dia	he/she (neutral)
kamay, kitao	kami, kita	we
uha	mereka	they

=== Interrogative pronouns ===
Kerinci	Indonesian	English
sapo	siapa	who
apo	apa	what
piyao	kenapa, mengapa	why
manao	mana, dimana	where
bilea, pabilea	kapan	when
manan	gimana, bagaimana	how
apea	berapa	how much
bileê	bila, apabila	if

=== Nouns ===
Kerinci	Indonesian	English
umoh	rumah	house
bateu	batu	stone
ksek	pasir	sand
sawoh	sawah	farm
uto	mobil	car
potlot	pensil	pencil
sayow	sayur	vegetable
lantaê	lantai	floor
laook	ikan	fish
kpa	kapal	ship
kapaêh	kapas	cotton
kabewk	kabut	fog
dahuêh	darah	blood
bumoy	bumi	earth
anayn	angin	wind
ambaw	rambut	hair
bal	bola	ball

=== Verbs ===
Kerinci	Indonesian	English
angkak	angkat	to carry
bankoyk	bangun	wake up
caboyk	robek	to tear
lahoy	lari	to run
gambuê	gambar	to draw
gawoê	kerja	to work
kampao	kumpul	to gather
tutawk	tutup	to close
dudeuk	duduk	to sit
janjoy	janji	to promise
inak	ingat	to remember

=== Adjectives ===
Kerinci	Indonesian	English
tinggai	tinggi	tall
ilaok	cantik	beautiful
buhuak, buhok	buruk	bad
gmouk	gemuk	fat
banyeak	banyak	many
muhah	murah	cheap
baranoy	berani	brave
lemak	enak, sedap	delicious
lkeh	cepat	fast
talambat	terlambat	late
rajain	rajin	hardworking
maleh	malas	lazy
sakiek	sakit	sick
kreh	keras	hard

=== Sample text ===
The following text is an excerpt from the official translation of the Universal Declaration of Human Rights in Indonesian and Kerinci, along with the original declaration in English:

English	Indonesian	Kerinci (Sungai Penuh Dialect)
Universal Declaration of Human Rights	Pernyataan Umum tentang Hak Asasi Manusia	Panyata Saduniê Pakarò Hak‑Hak Manusiò
Article 1	Pasal 1	Pasal 1
All human beings are born free and equal in dignity and rights. They are endowed with reason and conscience and should act towards one another in a spirit of brotherhood.	Semua orang dilahirkan merdeka dan mempunyai martabat dan hak‑hak yang sama. Mereka dikaruniai akal dan hati nurani dan hendaknya bergaul satu sama lain dalam semangat persaudaraan.	Sadou manusiò dilahe mardikê dan nahouh darjat ugê hak‑hak ngan samò. Galou uhang dibêhòi akang nga atei dan musti ideuk basamò uhang laain sarupò uhang badusanak.

== Writing system ==
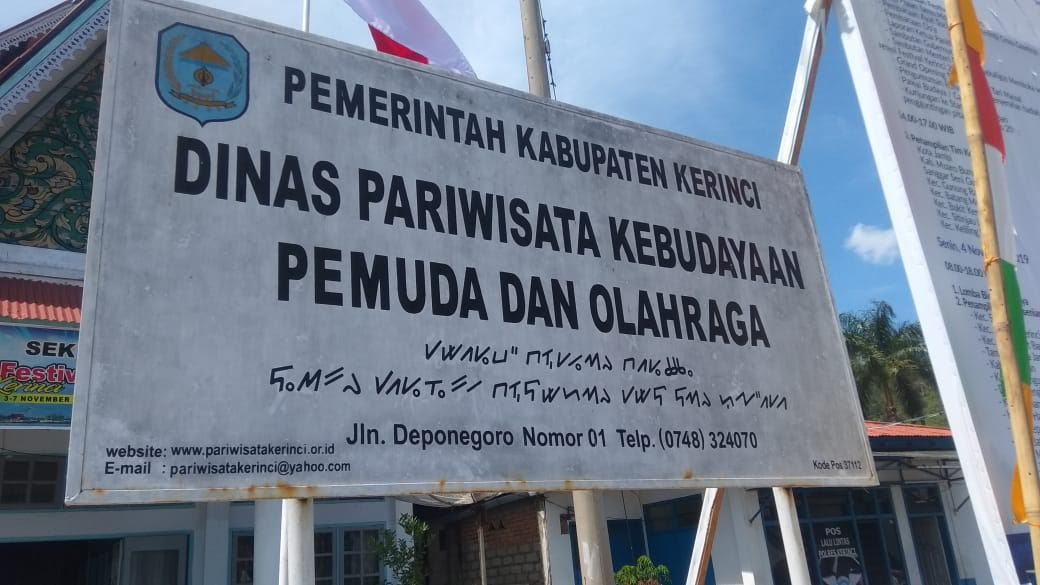
Government signs in Kerinci Regency and Sungai Penuh are now bilingual, featuring both Latin and Incung script

Historically, the Kerinci language was written in the Incung script (Suhat Incoung). The Incung script is the only known indigenous script attested in central Sumatra, related to both the Lampung script (used for the Lampung language) and the Rencong script (used for the Rejang language of southern Sumatra). In Kerinci, incung means "slanted" or "tilted". The script is composed of straight lines, broken and tilted segments, and curves, written at a slight angle. It is regarded as a cultural legacy of the Kerinci people and was used to record ancestral history, literary prose (romantic and elegiac), customary agreements, and spells.

Among the Kerinci people, it is commonly held that the emergence of the script and literature reflects a holistic cultural expression encompassing nature, humanity, and divinity. As a result, texts on buffalo horns, bamboo, bark, cloth, and paper are treated as sacred and revered, a view that remains influential in Kerinci cultural life. From the 19th century onward, such manuscripts have been kept as sacred objects. The Incung script continued in active use until around 1825. With the onset of the 20th century and the spread of Islam in Kerinci, use of Incung gradually declined as a medium of written communication, in part due to the rising influence of Islamic culture and the shift toward the Jawi script (Arab–Malay) for writing.

Today, few people remain who can read and write the Incung script, placing many manuscripts at risk of being forgotten by future generations. Factors include declining familiarity with the script and the continued practice of safeguarding manuscripts as revered heirlooms, which can limit access for study and transmission. Yet these texts contain moral, social, cultural, historical, and educational values that remain relevant.

Incung manuscripts are found in private homes and in public collections such as the Jambi State Museum and the National Museum of Indonesia in Jakarta, and abroad in Leiden (the Netherlands). In Jambi, interest from cultural institutions and government bodies has grown, with efforts focused on transliteration into the Latin script, research, school-based literacy programmes in Incung reading and writing, and the use of Incung on government and street signage, among other initiatives.

At present, Kerinci is written in several scripts: the original Incung, the Latin, and Jawi. Latin predominates due to its nationwide use in Indonesia. Incung is primarily reserved for cultural practice and ritual contexts, while Jawi is used in religious settings and Islamic educational institutions such as pesantren.

== Literature ==
The Kerinci community frequently uses proverbs and idioms to convey social values and norms. For example, the proverb bajalan kincie karno ayiek, bagoyang dahan karno angin ("Walking mill because of water; swaying branches because of wind") illustrates cause and effect, while apo digaduh pengayuh samo di tangan biduk samo di aek ("Sitting equal, standing equal") indicates shared rights and responsibilities. Another saying, bak membelah betung, sebelah dipijak, sebelah lagi diangkat tinggi‑tinggi ("Like splitting bamboo, one part is stepped on while the other is lifted high"), characterizes self‑interest at the expense of others. Pantun, a Malay‑world oral poetic form, is also widespread in Kerinci performance and everyday discourse.

Below is an example of a Kerinci pantun with Indonesian and English translations:

Kerinci	Indonesian	English
Cinak ini ruponyo ahi Patut nian buladang bawang. Cinak ini ruponyo kami Patut nian kami tibuang. Tigo luhah tanah sikudung Rumah gedang tempat berunding. Kato alah sudah kami tilangsung Kayo buralih ngan uhang lain. Bukan rakit ngato nak pnoh Buluh tirendam nak pnoh jugo. Bukan punyakit ngato nak munoh Rindu ngan dendam nak munoh jugo. Tinggi nyo bukik samo di daki Luhah ngan dalam samo ditempuh. Tunggu lah kayo ranah Kurinci Bialah kami tibuang jauh.	Beginilah rupanya hari Patut sekali berladang bawang. Beginilah rupanya kami Patut sekali kami terbuang. Tiga lurah tanah Sikudung Rumah gadang tempat berunding. Kata kita sudah sepakat Anda beralih dengan orang lain. Bukan rakit namanya jika penuh Buluh terendam akan penuh juga. Bukan penyakit yang akan membunuh Rindu dan dendam akan membunuh juga. Tinggi bukit sama didaki Lurah yang dalam sama ditempuh. Tunggulah kamu tanah Kerinci Biarlah kami terbuang jauh.	Such is the day; it's worth cultivating onions. So it is for us; we are deemed fit to be cast aside. Three valleys in the land of Sikudung; the rumah gadang is a place for deliberation. Our words have reached agreement; you have turned to someone else. It is not a raft merely because it's full; submerged bamboo will also be full. It is not illness alone that kills; longing and resentment can kill as well. The hill's height is the same when climbed; the deep valley must likewise be traversed. Wait for us, land of Kerinci; let us be cast far away.

Kerinci is also known for its folklore, locally called kunaung. Kunaung may be narrated, sung, or performed with accompaniment; common instruments include the rebana and drum, with occasional use of flute and gong. Some performances use improvised percussion, such as empty tin cans. Kunaung storytellers are noted for expressive delivery and immersion in the narrative tradition; accounts describe performers as guided by spirits or fairies, heightening audience engagement with the unfolding story. Examples include Putri Kemilau Air Emas, Orang Mudo Si Jaru Pantang, and Semegang Tunggal from Sitinjau Laut District; Bujang Suanggau and Bujang Buje from Sungai Penuh District; Si Jaru Panta, Si Kembang Payung Paya, Siyo‑Siyo Kau Tupai, Puti Limo, Puti Cikkettung, and Burung Kuwa from Danau Kerinci District; and Nyik Kileng from Gunung Kerinci District.

== Bibliography ==
- Ernanda (2017). Phrasal alternation in Kerinci (PhD dissertation). Leiden: Universiteit Leiden. hdl:1887/49206.
- Ernanda (2021). "Some notes on the Semerap dialect of Kerinci and its historical development". Wacana. 22 (1): 58–80. doi:10.17510/wacana.v22i1.978.
- McKinnon, Timothy; Cole, Peter; Hermon, Gabriella (2011). "Object Agreement and 'Pro-Drop' in Kerinci Malay". Language. 87 (4). Linguistic Society of America: 715–750. doi:10.1353/lan.2011.0092. S2CID 144479579.
- Nikelas, Syahwin; Amir, Zainuddin; Rusmali, Marah; Usman, Amir Hakim; Anwar, Jolsnidar (1981). Morfologi dan Sintaksis Bahasa Kerinci [Morphology and Syntax of the Kerinci Language] (PDF) (in Indonesian). Jakarta: Agency for Language Development and Cultivation, Department of Education and Culture.
- Nikelas, Syahwin; Rusmali, Marah; Ayub, Asni; Kasim, Yuslina; Usman, Amir Hakim (1985). Kata Tugas Bahasa Kerinci [Function Words in the Kerinci Language] (PDF) (in Indonesian). Jakarta: Agency for Language Development and Cultivation, Department of Education and Culture.
- Prentice, David J.; Usman, Amir Hakim (1978). "Kerinci sound-changes and phonotactics". In Wurm, S.A.; Carrington, L. (eds.). Second International Conference on Austronesian Linguistics: Proceedings. Pacific Linguistics. Vol. C61. Canberra: Pacific Linguistics, Australian National University. pp. 121–163. doi:10.15144/PL-C61.121.
- Steinhauer, Hein (2002). "More (on) Kerinci sound-changes" (PDF). In K. Alexander Adelaar; Robert Blust (eds.). Between Worlds: Linguistic Papers in Memory of David John Prentice. Pacific Linguistics. Vol. 529. Canberra: Pacific Linguistics, Australian National University. pp. 149–176.
- Steinhauer, Hein (2018). "Sound-changes and loanwords in Sungai Penuh Kerinci". Wacana: Journal of the Humanities of Indonesia. 19 (2): 375–407. doi:10.17510/wacana.v19i2.708. S2CID 135209683.
- Steinhauer, Hein; Usman, Amir Hakim (1978). "Notes on the morphemics of Kerinci (Sumatra)". In Wurm, S.A.; Carrington, L. (eds.). Second International Conference on Austronesian Linguistics: Proceedings. Pacific Linguistics. Vol. C61. Pacific Linguistics, Australian National University. pp. 483–502. doi:10.15144/PL-C61.483.
- Usman, A. Hakim (1985). Kamus Umum Kerinci–Indonesia [Kerinci–Indonesian Dictionary] (PDF) (in Indonesian). Jakarta: Agency for Language Development and Cultivation, Department of Education and Culture.
- Usman, Amir Hakim (1988). Fonologi dan Morfologi Bahasa Kerinci Dialek Sungai Penuh [Phonology and Morphology of the Sungai Penuh Dialect of Kerinci Language] (PhD dissertation) (in Indonesian). Jakarta: Universitas Indonesia.
- van Reijn, Eric (1974). "Some Remarks on the Dialects of North Kerintji: A link with Mon-Khmer Languages". Journal of the Malaysian Branch of the Royal Asiatic Society. 31 (2): 130–138. JSTOR 41492089.
- Yanti; McKinnon, Timothy; Cole, Peter; Hermon, Gabriella (2018). "The phonological basis of syntactic change in Kerinci". Oceanic Linguistics. 57 (2). University of Hawaiʻi Press: 433–483. doi:10.1353/ol.2018.0018. S2CID 149686433.
- Yanti; McKinnon, Timothy; Mudra, Heri; Cole, Peter; Hermon, Gabriella (2017). "The poetic and linguistic structure of a kunaung: The story of Saripanta". NUSA: Linguistic Studies of Languages in and Around Indonesia. 63: 81–99. doi:10.15026/91752.
