= Lake Gunung Tujuh =

Lake in Indonesia

Gunung Tujuh
- Danau Gunung Tujuh (Indonesian) تاسيق ڬونوڠ توجوه (Jawi)
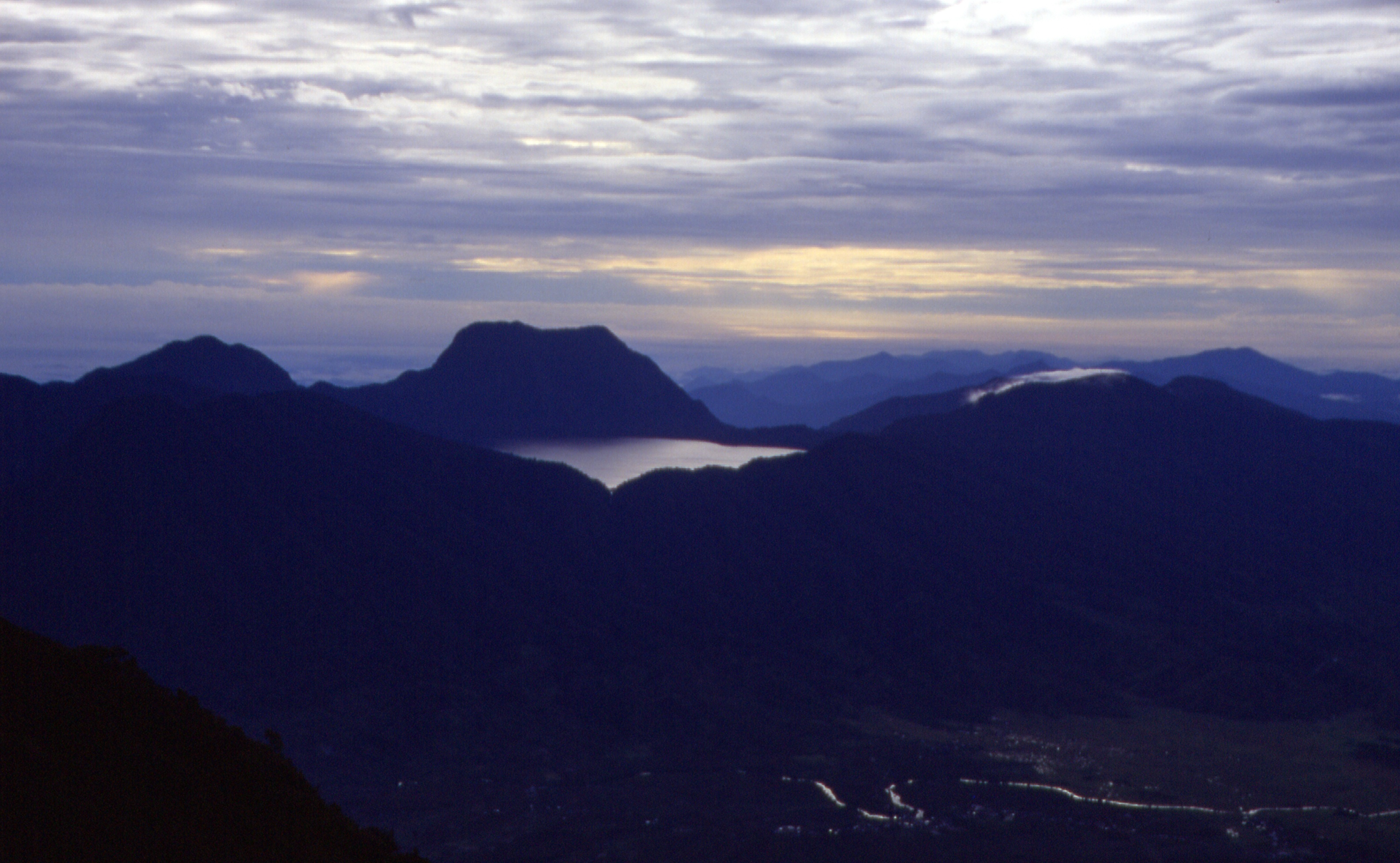

- Location within Sumatra
- Location: Jambi, Indonesia
- Coordinates: 1°42′23″S 101°24′42″E
- Type: Caldera
- Basin countries: Indonesia
- Max. length: 4.5 km (2.8 mi)
- Max. width: 3 km (1.9 mi)
- Surface area: 9.6 km^{2} (3.7 sq mi)
- Max. depth: 40 m (130 ft)
- Surface elevation: 2,005 m (6,578 ft)

Lake Gunung Tujuh or The Seven Mountain Lake in English is a volcanic crater lake in the province of Jambi, Indonesia, located at 1°42′23″S 101°24′42″E within Kerinci National Park. Although a young lake, in geologic terms, its surrounding volcano, Mount Tujuh, is old and not immediately obvious as such. The name "Danau Gunung Tujuh" translates as "Seven Mountain Lake," a seeming reference to seven peaks comprising the forested rim. The tallest of them rises 2732m above sea level, while the lake surface sits at 2005m. The lake is a popular overnight hiking destination among Park visitors and is sometimes fished by locals. Mount Kerinci stands nearby.

== See also ==
- List of drainage basins of Indonesia
- List of lakes of Indonesia
