= Kaco (drum) =

Shamanistic drum of the Ainu people

The kaco is a type of shamanistic drum of the Ainu people, primarily those of Sakhalin Island.

== Construction ==
The instrument is made of a wooden branch of willow or larch bent into an ellipse with a membrane of musk deer skin; the drum beater is covered in dogskin.

== Etymology ==
The word kaco may be a loan-word from the Orok language. The drum may be more formally called senisteh, a word referring to charms in general.
