= Lake Kerinci =

Lake of Sumatera, Indonesia

Kerinci
- Danau Kerinci (Indonesian) تاسيق كرينچي (Jawi)
- Location within Sumatra
- Location: Jambi, Indonesia
- Coordinates: 2°8′55″S 101°29′34″E
- Type: Tectonic/ volcanic
- Part of: Batanghari basin
- Primary outflows: Merangin River, Batang Kali River system
- Basin countries: Indonesia
- Surface area: 46 km^{2} (18 sq mi)
- Max. depth: 97 m (318 ft)
- Water volume: 1.6 km^{3} (1,300,000 acre⋅ft)
- Surface elevation: 785 m (2,575 ft)

Lake Kerinci (Indonesian: Danau Kerinci) is a lake in Jambi, Indonesia. It is located at 2°8′55″S 101°29′34″E.

The cyprinid fish Osteochilus kerinciensis is named after Lake Kerinci, its type locality.

== See also ==
- Lake Kaco
- List of drainage basins of Indonesia
- List of lakes of Indonesia
