= Kerinci Seblat National Park =

National park on the island of Sumatra, Indonesia

- Taman Nasional Kerinci Seblat
- IUCN category II (national park)
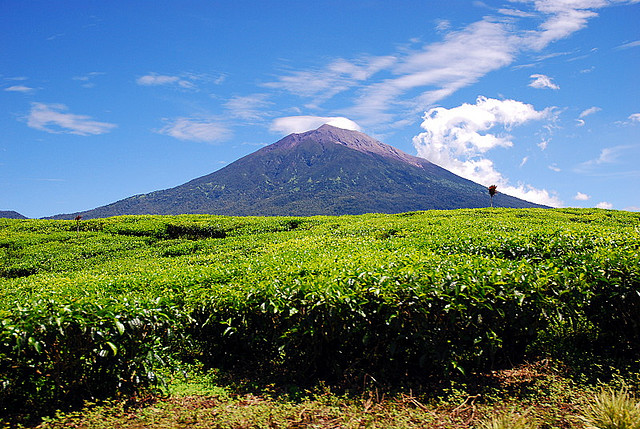
- Mount Kerinci in Kerinci Seblat National Park

- Location within Sumatra Location within Indonesia
- Location: Sumatra, Indonesia
- Nearest city: Padang
- Coordinates: 2°25′S 101°29′E
- Area: 1,375,000 ha (5,310 sq mi)
- Established: 1999
- Governing body: Ministry of Environment and Forestry
- World Heritage site: 2004
- Website: http://tnkerinciseblat.or.id/

UNESCO World Heritage Site
- Type: Natural
- Criteria: vii, ix, x
- Designated: 2004 (28th session)
- Part of: Tropical Rainforest Heritage of Sumatra
- Reference no.: 1167
- Region: Asia-Pacific
- Endangered: 2011–present

Kerinci Seblat National Park is the largest national park on the island of Sumatra, Indonesia. It has a total area of 13,791 km^{2} and spans four provinces: West Sumatra, Jambi, Bengkulu, and South Sumatra.

== Geography ==
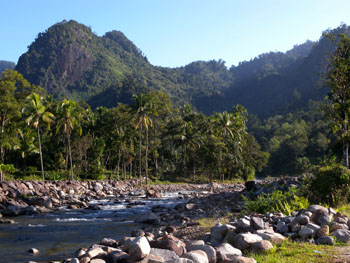
A river in Kerinci Seblat National Park

It is located between 100°31'18"E - 102°44'01"E and 1°07'13"S - 3°26'14"S.

The park area includes a large part of the Barisan mountain range, which forms the western spine of Sumatra island and includes the highest peak in Sumatra, Mount Kerinci (3,805 m), one of more than five active volcanoes in the national park. This mainly montane park includes hot springs, rivers with rapids, caves, scenic waterfalls, and the highest caldera lake in Southeast Asia - Lake Gunung Tujuh, while the Great Sumatran fault runs through the national park making the area of great interest to geologists. The park completely encircles the populated Kerinci Valley.

== Flora and fauna ==
The park is home to diverse flora and fauna. Over 4,000 plant species have been identified to date in the park area, including the world's largest flower, Rafflesia arnoldii, and the plant with the largest unbranched inflorescence, the titan arum.

The fauna includes Sumatran tigers, and the park is recognised under the Global Tiger Initiative as one of the 12 most important protected areas in the world for tiger conservation. A recent study shows that the Kerinci Seblat National Park in central Sumatra has the highest population of tigers on the island, estimated to be 165-190 individuals. The park also was shown to have the highest tiger occupancy rate of the protected areas, with 83% of the park showing signs of tigers. More tigers are in the Kerinci Seblat National Park than in all of China, Laos, Cambodia, and Vietnam combined.

The national park is home to other kinds of big, medium, and small cats, Sunda clouded leopard/macan dahan (Neofelis diardi), marbled cat/kucing batu (Pardofelis marmorata), leopard cat/kucing hutan (Prionailurus bengalensis), and Asian golden cat/kucing emas (Catopuma temminckii). The Asian golden cats can be found everywhere in the national park, as they adapt well to various kinds of habitats, both forested and open spaces. One camera trap image gave a rare photo of a golden cat mother moving a cub to another location with her mouth.

Other highly endangered species include Sumatran dhole, Sumatran elephants, Sunda clouded leopard, Malayan tapir, and Malayan sun bear. In 2008, the International Union for Conservation of Nature added a second species of muntjak deer to the Sumatran list of fauna with the rediscovery of the Sumatran muntjac, a deer not recorded since the late 1920s and now concluded as a new species and not subspecies. The park also protects more than 370 bird species, including the Sumatran ground-cuckoo rediscovered in the park in 2002.

The Kerinci area is home to more than 300 bird species, including 17 of Sumatra's 20 endemic birds, making it of particular importance to ornithologists and bird-watching enthusiasts.

The population of Sumatran rhinoceros in the park was estimated to number around 500 in the 1980s, but due to poaching, the Kerinci Seblat population is now considered extinct.

== Conservation and threats ==
The national park was declared in 1982, formed from numerous watershed protection forests or hutan lindung and small nature reserves, although its borders were only legally confirmed in the late 1990s.

Together with Bukit Barisan Selatan and Gunung Leuser National Parks, it forms a World Heritage Site, Tropical Rainforest Heritage of Sumatra. Since 2011 UNESCO also listed this world heritage as World Heritage in Danger.

Kerinci Seblat National Park is also recognised as an ASEAN Heritage Site.

== See also ==
- Batang Hari River
- Geography of Indonesia
- Lake Kaco
- Lake Kerinci
- Mount Kerinci
- Mount Sumbing (Sumatra)
