= Mount Kerinci =

Volcano in Sumatra, Indonesia

- Gunung Kerinci
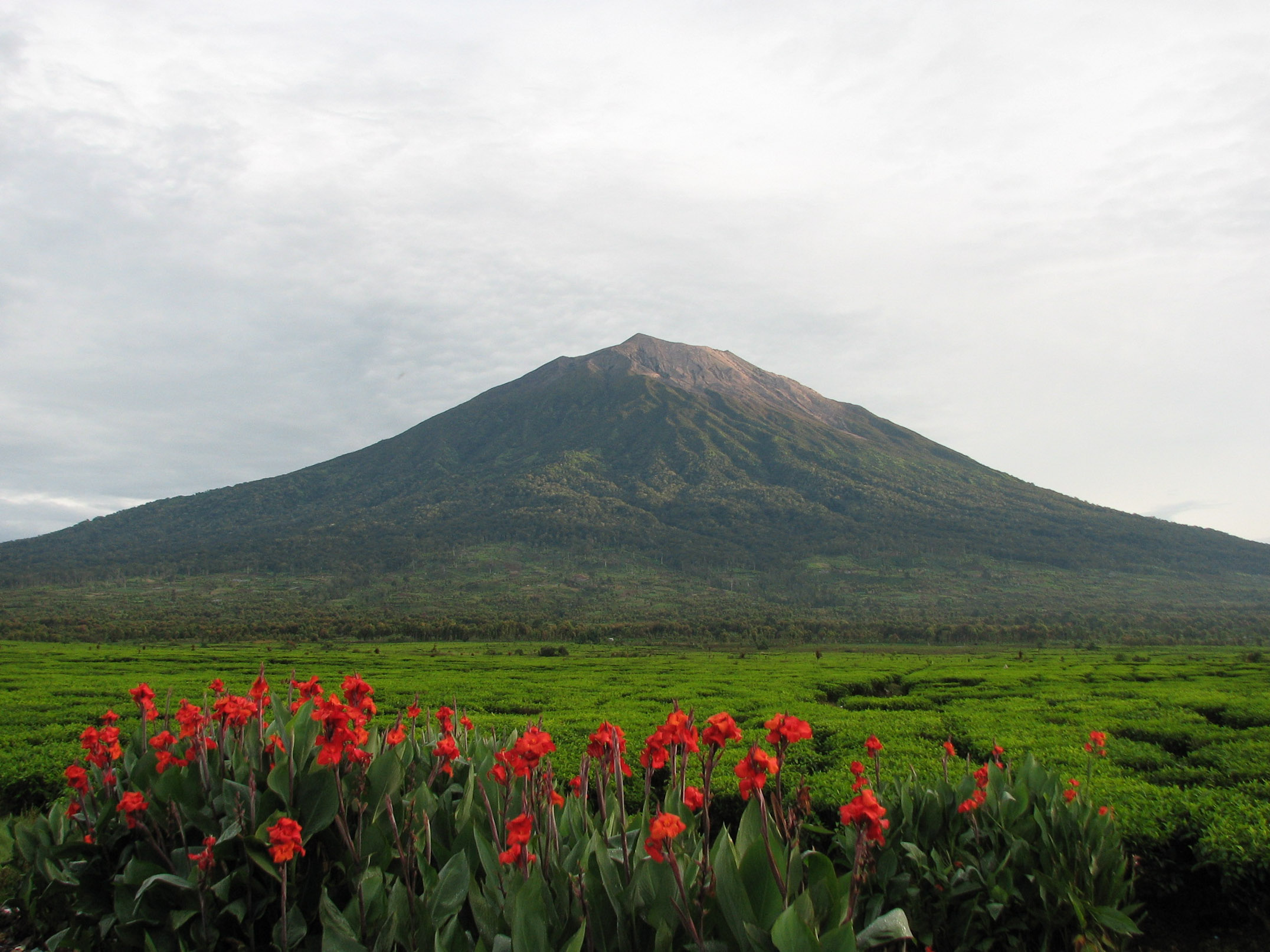
- Kerinci as seen from Kayu Aro

Highest point
- Elevation: 3,805 m (12,484 ft)
- Prominence: 3,805 m (12,484 ft); Ranked 33rd
- Isolation: 1,904.03 km (1,183.11 mi)
- Listing: Island high point Ultra; Ribu
- Coordinates: 1°41′48″S 101°15′56″E

Geography
- Location within Sumatra Location within Indonesia
- Location: Sumatra, Indonesia
- Parent range: Barisan Mountains

Geology
- Mountain type: Stratovolcano
- Volcanic arc: Sunda Arc
- Last eruption: 2022

Climbing
- First ascent: December 1877 by Arend Ludolf van Hasselt and Daniël David Veth

Mount Kerinci (Kerinci: Gunung Kincai, Minangkabau: Gunuang Kurinci, Indonesian: Gunung Kerinci), also spelled Kerintji, is an active stratovolcano and the highest mountain in Sumatra, Indonesia. At 3,805 metres (12,484 ft) above sea level, it provides Sumatra with the fifth-highest maximum elevation of any island in the world. It is surrounded by the lush forest of Kerinci Seblat National Park, home to several endangered species including the Sumatran tiger. Mount Kerinci is ranked 32nd by topographic isolation.

== Geography ==
At 3,805 metres (12,484 ft) above sea level, Kerinci is the highest volcano in Indonesia, and the highest of any situated on an island that is a part of Asia. Kerinci is located on the border of the titular Kerinci Regency of Jambi province and South Solok Regency of West Sumatra province, in the west-central part of the island near the west coast, and is about 130 km (81 mi) south of Padang.

It is part of the Barisan Mountains, a chain of volcanoes that span from the extreme northwest of the island (in Aceh province) to the extreme southeast (in Lampung province). It is the most prominent feature of the terrain of Kerinci Seblat National Park, with pine-forested slopes rising 2,400–3,300 metres (7,900–10,800 ft) above the surrounding basin, and a cone 13 km (8 mi) wide and 25 km (16 mi) long at the base, elongated in the north–south direction. At the summit, there is a deep 600 m (1,969 ft) wide crater, often partially filled by a small crater lake on the northeast side of the crater floor.

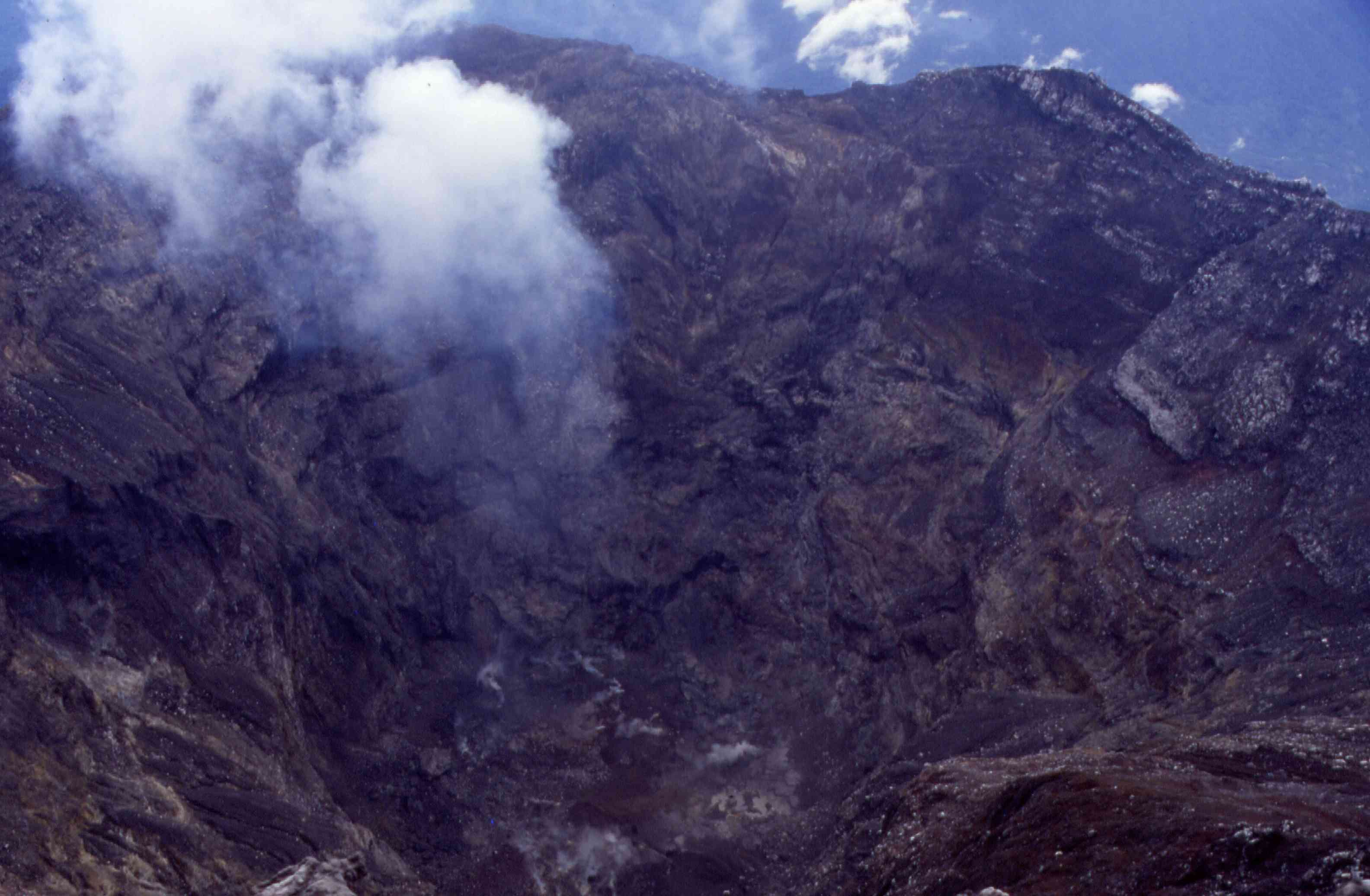
View into the Kerinci crater.

== Volcanic activity ==
Kerinci is more active than most Indonesian volcanoes, with nearly annual phreatic eruptions. In 2004, Kerinci erupted and continues to spew clouds of sulfurous smoke, with plumes reaching as high as 1,000 m (3,281 ft) above the summit. In 2009, Kerinci erupted again, followed by a June 2, 2013 eruption with spewed black smoke rising 600 m (1,969 ft).

== Climbing ==
Kerinci was first climbed in December 1877 by Dutch mountaineers Arend Ludolf van Hasselt and Daniël David Veth. It can be climbed from the village of Kersik Tuo, 6 or 7 hours away from Padang by car or bus. The climb and descent normally takes 2 days and 1 night, when choosing to go all the way to the summit. Climbers may also choose to go up only as far as Camp 2 or 3, skipping the summit attempt, which requires a pre-dawn climb. Kerinci's terrain consists of thick jungle and can get muddy and slippery even if in only mild drizzles, which may occur occasionally even during the dry season. Anyone wishing to climb the volcano requires the services of a guide, under the Kerinci Seblat National Park regulations. There have been rare cases of people disappearing and/or dying from exposure or falls after attempting to trek alone.

== Lakes ==
The Kerinci Seblat National Park has at least fifteen lakes of note, with the biggest being Kerinci Lake, followed by Gunung Tujuh Lake. The 4,200 hectares of Kerinci Lake lies at a height of 650 metres (2,130 ft), and is the host of the annual Kerinci Lake Festival. Gunung Tujuh Lake (literally, Seven Mountains Lake) is a caldera lake formed in an extinct volcano and is surrounded by seven peaks. It is also the highest lake in Southeast Asia at 1,996 metres (6,549 ft).

== Kecik Wok Gedang Wok ==
Based on research in 1973, the 'Kecik Wok Gedang Wok' people are recognized as the first tribe to settle at a plateau around Mount Kerinci 10,000 years ago. Today, the Kecik Wong Gedang Wok people are limited due to assimilation with the Proto-Malay tribes which came later. Around 135 dialects are used only along the valley. This makes ethnographic analysis difficult to conduct.

== See also ==
- List of ultras of the Malay Archipelago
- List of volcanoes in Indonesia
- Kerinci Seblat National Park
