= Kerinci Regency =

Regency in Jambi, Indonesia

Coordinates: 2°05′02″S 101°28′48″E

Kerinci Regency Kabupaten Kerinci
- Regency
- Coat of arms
- Motto(s): Sakti Alam Kerinci (Kerinci a sacred realm)
- Country: Indonesia
- Province: Jambi
- Regency seat: Siulak

Government
  - Regent: Monadi
  - Vice Regent: Murison

Area
  - Total: 3,445.20 km^{2} (1,330.20 sq mi)

Population (mid 2025 estimate)
  - Total: 272,932
  - Density: 79.2209/km^{2} (205.181/sq mi)
- Time zone: UTC+7 (WIB)
- Website: kerincikab.go.id

Kerinci is a regency (kabupaten) in Jambi province, on the island of Sumatra, Indonesia. The regency has an area of 3,445.20 km^{2} (1,330.20 sq mi). Kerinci Regency had a population of 229,495 at the 2010 Census and 250,259 at the 2020 Census; the official estimate as of mid 2025 was 272,832 (comprising 135,055 males and 133,896 females in 2024). The regency largely surrounds the city of Sungai Penuh (except on the city's western side), which until its separation on 24 June 2008 was part of the regency but is now independent of it. The regency seat is at the town of Siulak. Kerinci is located 50 km (31 mi) from Jambi City, the capital of Jambi Province.

== Geography ==
Mount Kerinci, the highest volcano in Indonesia and all of Southeast Asia, is found in the northern part of the Kerinci regency, in the Kayu Aro highland plateau, bordering West Sumatra. Lake Kerinci (Danau Kerinci), a large lake covering 46 km^{2} and an important source of fish for the region, is found in the central/southern parts of the Kerinci valley. An azure-blue, spring-fed lake called Lake Kaco (Danau Kaco) is located in the rainforest near the village of Lempur in the Gunung Raya ("Mountain Kingdom") District. Much of the land area of the Kerinci regency is within the boundaries of the Kerinci Seblat National Park.

== Administrative districts ==
At the 2010 Census there were twelve districts (kecamatan), but four more were added in 2013 and another two in 2020. The eighteen districts currently forming the Regency are listed below with their areas and their populations at the 2010 Census and the 2020 Census, together with the official estimates as of mid 2025. These are shown grouped into two halves, respectively south and north of the city of Sungai Penuh. The table also includes the locations of the district administrative centres, the number of villages in each district (totaling 285 rural desa and 2 urban kelurahan), and its post code.

Kode Wilayah	Name of District (kecamatan)	Area in km^{2}	Pop'n Census 2010	Pop'n Census 2020	Pop'n Estimate mid 2025	Admin centre	No. of villages	Post code
15.01.01	Gunung Raya	408.95	13,928	8,415	9,185	Lempur Tengah	12 ^{(1)}	37174
15.01.20	Bukit Kerman	195.56	^{(b)}	12,369	14,786	Pondok	15	37176
15.01.07	Batang Meringin	504.73	16,887	11,859	13,526	Tamiai	9	37175
15.01.08	Keliling Danau	328.79	21,969	25,454	13,656	Jujun	18	37173
15.01.23	Danau Kerinci Barat (West Danau Kerinci)	30.69	^{(c)}	^{(c)}	12,548	Serumpun Pauh	14	37173
15.01.02	Danau Kerinci	215.82	15,743	17,856	14,709	Sanggaran Agung	13	37172
15.01.22	Tanah Cogok	20.30	^{(c)}	^{(c)}	9,605	Koto Tuo Ujung Pasir	12	37171 & 37172
15.01.04	Sitinjau Laut	53.40	13,943	14,611	10,614	Hiang	14	37171
Sub-total	Southern half	1,758.24	82,470	90,564	98,629		107	
15.01.05	Air Hangat	21.62	19,456	11,474	11,805	Semurup	16	37168
15.01.11	Air Hangat Timur (East Air Hangat)	179.89	17,459	19,556	21,175	Sungai Tutung	25	37167
15.01.17	Depati VII ^{(d)} (Depati Tujuh)	25.57	14,423	16,790	17,418	Koto Tuo	20	37161
15.01.21	Air Hangat Barat (West Air Hangat)	12.57	^{(b)}	9,906	10,631	Koto Cayo	12	37166
15.01.06	Gunung Kerinci	345.65	11,601	12,760	13,784	Siulak Deras	16 ^{(e)}	37162
15.01.16	Siulak	124.52	30,742	22,884	24,522	Dusun Baru	26	37160
15.01.18	Siulak Mukai	487.54	^{(b)}	11,139	12,283	Mukai Pintu	14	37169
15.01.09	Kayu Aro	125.42	39,308	19,754	22,558	Tanjung Bungo	21	37164
15.01.15	Gunung Tujuh	153.82	14,036	14,950	16,971	Pelompek	13	37163
15.01.19	Kayu Aro Barat (West Kayu Aro)	210.37	^{(b)}	20,482	23,054	Bedeng Dua	17	37165
Sub-total	Northern half	1,686.96	147,025	159,695	174,203		180	
	Total Regency	3,445.20	229,495	250,259	272,832	Siulak	287	

Note: (a) including the kelurahan of Lempur Tengah. (b) The 2010 populations of these new districts are included with that of the existing districts from which they were cut out in 2013.
(c) The 2010 and 2020 populations of these new districts are included with that of the existing districts from which they were cut out in 2020 (West Lake Kerinci District - or Danau Kerinci Barat - from Keliling Danau, and Tanah Cogok District from Danau Kerinci).
(d) Depati VII District lies on the north side of Sungai Penuh city, to which it is largely suburban. (e) including the kelurahan of Siulak Deras.

== Mount Seven Lake ==
Mount Seven Lake is the highest caldera in Southeast Asia 1,950 m (6,400 ft) at above mean sea level, with a lake area of 960 hectares (2,400 acres). The mount is called Mount Seven because there are seven summits. Mount Seven is located in Kerinci Seblat National Park. The lake has a white sandy beach and Mount Seven Waterfall.

== See also ==
- 1995 Kerinci earthquake
- Kersik Tua
