= Jambi =

Province in Sumatra, Indonesia

- Province
- Province of Jambi; Provinsi Jambi
- Coat of arms
- Motto(s): Sepucuk Jambi Sembilan Lurah (Jambi Malay) (One Jambi indigenous territory, formed by nine river settlements)
- Anthem: Mars Provinsi Jambi "Jambi Provincial March"
- Jambi in Indonesia
- Interactive map of Jambi
- Coordinates: 1°36′S 103°36′E
- Country: Indonesia
- Region: Sumatra (Western Indonesia)
- Established: 6 January 1957
- Capital and largest city: Jambi

Government
  - Body: Jambi Provincial Government
  - Governor: Al Haris (PAN)
  - Vice Governor: Abdullah Sani (PKB)
  - Legislature: Jambi Regional House of Representatives (DPRD)

Area
  - Total: 49,023.04 km^{2} (18,927.90 sq mi)
  - Rank: 11th
- Elevation: 500 m (1,600 ft)
- Highest elevation (Mount Kerinci): 3,805 m (12,484 ft)

Population (mid 2025)
  - Total: 3,768,490
  - Rank: 19th
  - Density: 76.8718/km^{2} (199.097/sq mi)
  - Rank: 23rd

Demographics
  - Ethnic groups: 38% Jambi Malays; 20% Javanese; 10.2% Chinese; 10% Kerinci; 31.80% Others
  - Religion: 95.00% Islam; 4.03% Christianity: 3.44% Protestant; 0.59% Catholic; 0.87% Buddhism; 0.07% Folk religion 0.02% Confucianism; 0.01% Hinduism
  - Languages and dialects: Indonesian (official); Jambi Malay, Kerinci, Kubu (regional)
- GDP (nominal): 2022
- Total: Rp 276.3 trillion (15th); US$ 18.6 billion Int$ 58.1 billion (PPP)
- Per capita: Rp 76.1 million (8th); US$ 5,125; Int$ 15,991 (PPP)
- Growth: ▲5.13%
- HDI (2024): ▲0.744 (18th) – high
- Website: jambiprov.go.id

Jambi (Jawi: جمبي) is a province of Indonesia. It is located on the east coast of central Sumatra and stretches to the Barisan Mountains in the west. Its capital and largest city is also called Jambi. It is bordered by the provinces of Riau to the north, West Sumatra to the west, Bengkulu to the southwest, South Sumatra to the south, and shares a maritime border with the Riau Islands to the east and the Pacific Ocean to the east. The province has a land area of 49,023.04 km^{2}, and a sea area of 3,274.95 km^{2}. Its area is comparable to the European country of Slovakia or Smolensk Oblast. It had a population of 3,092,265 according to the 2010 census and 3,548,228 according to the 2020 census; the official estimate of population as at mid 2025 was 3,768,490 (comprising 1,914,250 males and 1,854,220 females), projected to rise to 3,811,660 (comprising 1,934,410 males and 1,877,270 females) as at mid 2026.

== History ==
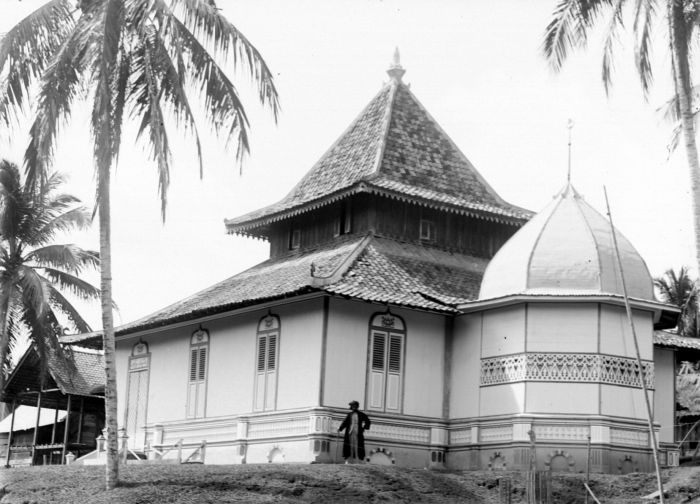
Mosque in Jambi, during the colonial period. ca 1900–1939.

Jambi was the site of the Melayu kingdom that engaged in trade throughout the Strait of Malacca and beyond. It was recorded as having sent a mission to China in 644 CE. It was annexed by Srivijaya by 685 CE, but tried to declare its independence in the 9th century. Jambi succeeded Palembang, its southern economic and military rival, as the major player in trade in the Malacca straits. After the 1025 Chola raids in Southeast Asia, Jambi still sent missions to China.

In the early decades of the Dutch presence in the region, when the Dutch were one of several traders competing with the British, Chinese, Arabs, and Malays, the Jambi Sultanate profited from trade in pepper with the Dutch. This relationship declined by about 1770, and the sultanate had little contact with the Dutch for about sixty years.

In 1833, minor conflicts with the Dutch East Indies who were well established in Palembang, meant the Dutch increasingly felt the need to control the actions of Jambi. They coerced Sultan Facharudin to agree to greater Dutch presence in the region and control over trade, although the sultanate remained nominally independent. In 1858 the Dutch, concerned over the risk of competition for control from other foreign powers, invaded Jambi with a force from their capital Batavia. They met little resistance, and Sultan Taha fled upriver, to the inland regions of Jambi. The Dutch installed a puppet ruler, Nazarudin, in the lower region, which included the capital city. For the next forty years Taha maintained the upriver kingdom, and slowly reextended his influence over the lower regions through political agreements and marriage connections. In 1904, however, the Dutch were stronger and, as a part of a larger campaign to consolidate control over the entire archipelago, managed to capture and kill Taha, and in 1906, the entire area was brought under direct colonial control.

Following the death of Jambi Sultan, Taha Saifuddin, on 27 April 1904 and the success of the Dutch controlled areas of the Sultanate of Jambi, Jambi then was set up as a Residency and entry into the territory Netherlands Indies. Jambi's first Resident OL Helfrich was appointed by the governor general under Dutch Decree No. 20, dated 4 May 1906, with his inauguration held on 2 July 1906.

In 1945, Sumatra comprised a single province, but in 1948 this was divided into three provinces, including the province of Central Sumatra (which included present-day Jambi Province). In 1957 this short-lived province was itself divided, and Jambi was created as an independent Province.

Historical population
Year	Pop.	±%
1971	1,006,084	—
1980	1,445,994	+43.7%
1990	2,020,568	+39.7%
1995	2,369,959	+17.3%
2000	2,407,166	+1.6%
2005	2,635,968	+9.5%
2010	3,092,265	+17.3%
2015	3,397,164	+9.9%
2020	3,548,228	+4.4%
2025	3,768,490	+6.2%
Source: Badan Pusat Statistik 2026 and earlier editions.

== Government and administrative divisions ==
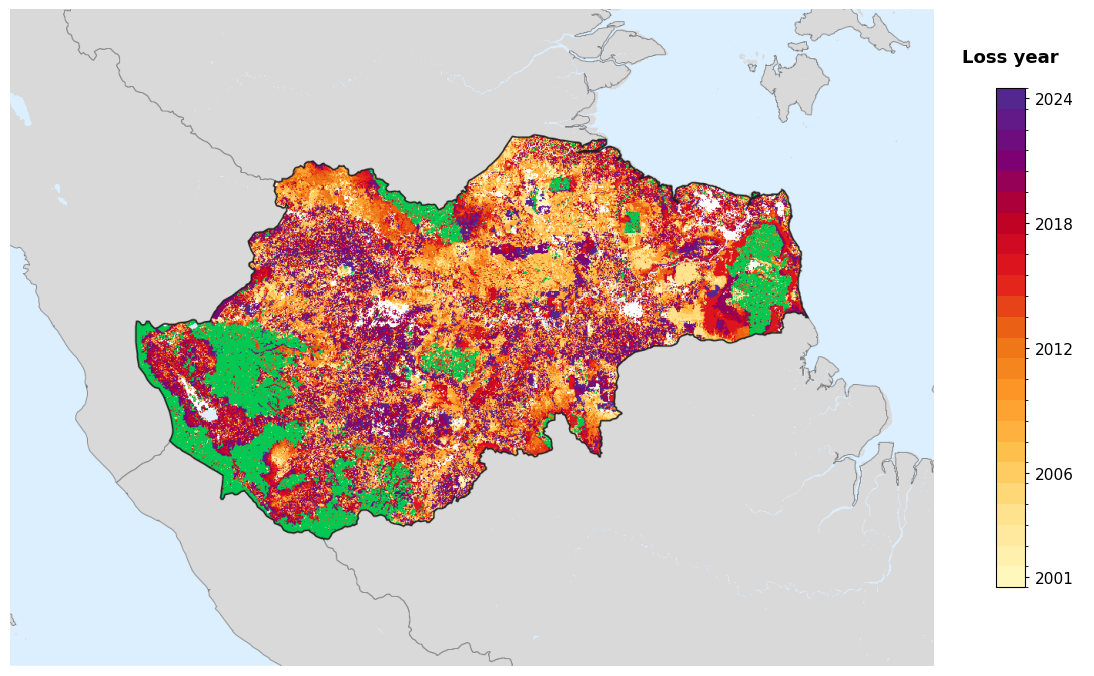
Tree-cover loss year in Jambi, 2001-2024, from the Global Forest Change dataset.

When Jambi Province was created in 1957, it comprised three regencies - Kerinci (renamed from South Pesisir Regency on 19 March 1956), Batanghari and Bungo Tebo - as well as the independent city of Jambi. On 14 June 1965 two new regencies were formed - Sarolangun Bangko from part of Bungo Tebo Regency, and Tanjung Jabung from part of Batanghari Regency. On 4 October 1999 four additional regencies were created by splitting each of four existing regencies in two - Muara Jambi was formed from part of Batanghari Regency, while Sarolangun Bangko Regency was split into separate Sarolangun and Merangin Regencies, Tanjung Jabung Regency was split into separate Tanjung Jabung Barat (West Tanjung Jabung) and Tanjung Jabung Timur (East Tanjung Jabung) Regencies, and Bungo Tebo Regency was split into separate Bungo and Tebo Regencies. Finally, a second independent city of Sungai Penuh (Penuh River) was split off from Kerinci Regency on 1 July 2008.

Thus Jambi province is now divided into nine regencies (kabupaten) and two cities (kota), listed below with their areas and their populations at the 2010 and 2020 censuses, together with the official estimates as of mid 2025. These are divided into 141 districts (kecamatan), in turn sub-divided into 153 urban villages (kelurahan) and 1,399 rural villages (desa).

Kode Wilayah	Name of City or Regency	Area in km^{2}	Pop'n census 2010	Pop'n census 2020	Pop'n estimate mid 2025	Capital	HDI 2018 Estimates
15.01	Kerinci Regency	3,445.20	229,495	250,259	258,210	Siulak	0.705 (High)
15.02	Merangin Regency	7,540.12	333,206	354,052	378,360	Bangko	0.688 (Medium)
15.03	Sarolangun Regency	5,935.89	246,245	290,047	310,680	Sarolangun	0.694 (Medium)
15.04	Batanghari Regency	5,434.69	241,334	301,700	320,280	Muara Bulian	0.693 (Medium)
15.05	Muaro Jambi Regency	5,159.62	342,952	402,017	430,250	Sengeti	0.683 (Medium)
15.07	East Tanjung Jabung Regency (Tanjung Jabung Timur)	4,544.58	205,272	229,813	241,150	Muara Sabak	0.633 (Medium)
15.06	West Tanjung Jabung Regency (Tanjung Jabung Barat)	5,544.57	278,741	317,498	339,630	Kuala Tungkal	0.671 (Medium)
15.09	Tebo Regency	6,103.74	297,735	337,669	359,640	Muara Tebo	0.686 (Medium)
15.08	Bungo Regency	4,760.83	303,135	362,363	386,110	Muara Bungo	0.694 (Medium)
15.71	Jambi City	169.89	531,857	606,200	642,260	-	0.774 (High)
15.72	Sungai Penuh City	364.92	82,293	96,610	101,920	-	0.746 (High)
	Total province	49,023.04	3,092,265	3,548,228	3,768,490	Jambi	0.705 (High)

The province forms one of Indonesia's 84 national electoral districts to elect members to the People's Representative Council. The Jambi Electoral District consists of all of the 9 regencies in the province, together with the cities of Jambi and Sungai Penuh, and elects 8 members to the People's Representative Council.

== World Heritage Sites ==
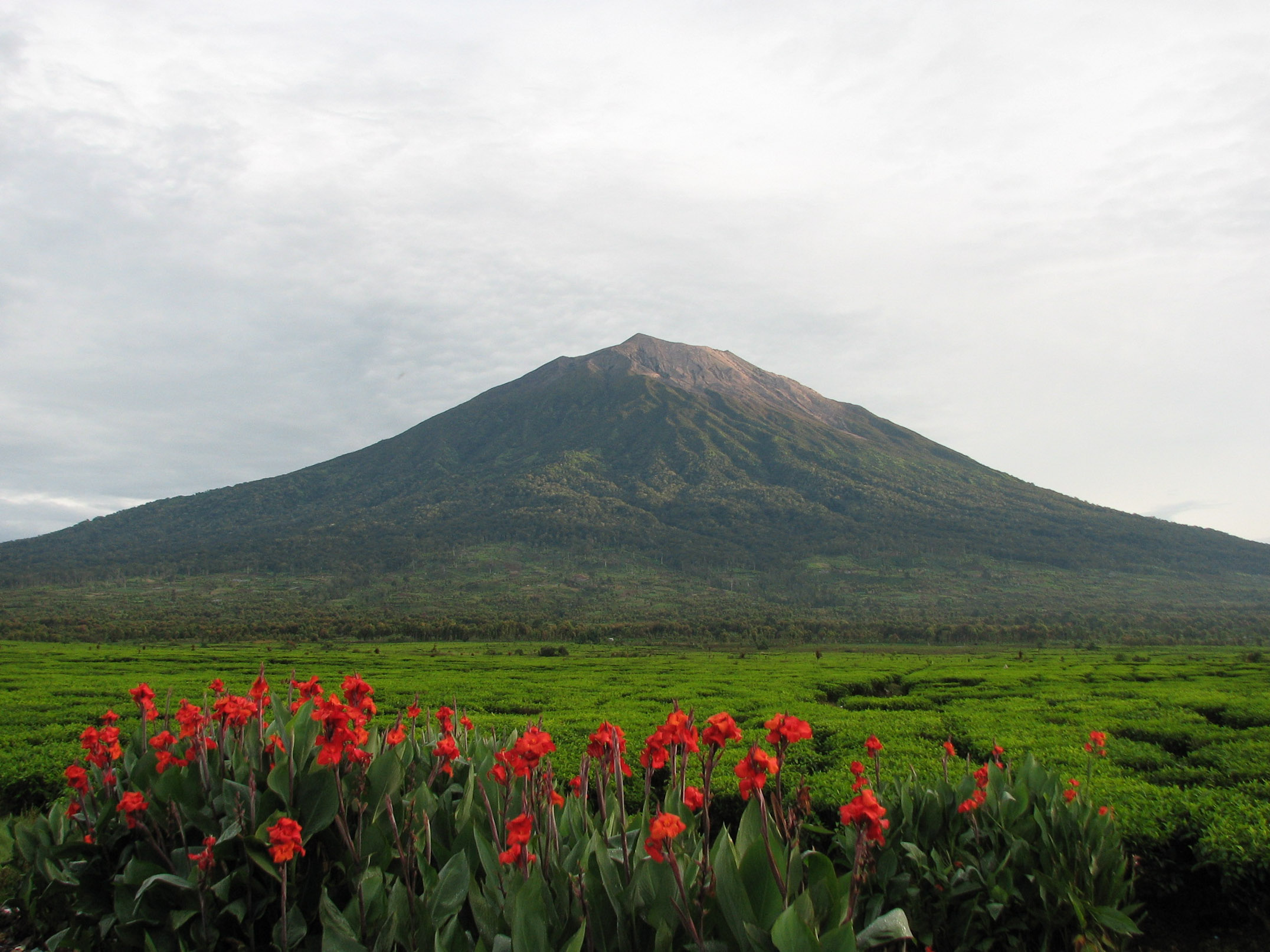
Mount Kerinci, the tallest mountain in Sumatra

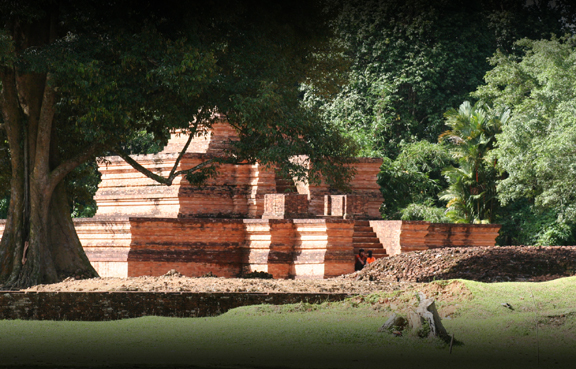
Muaro Jambi Temples

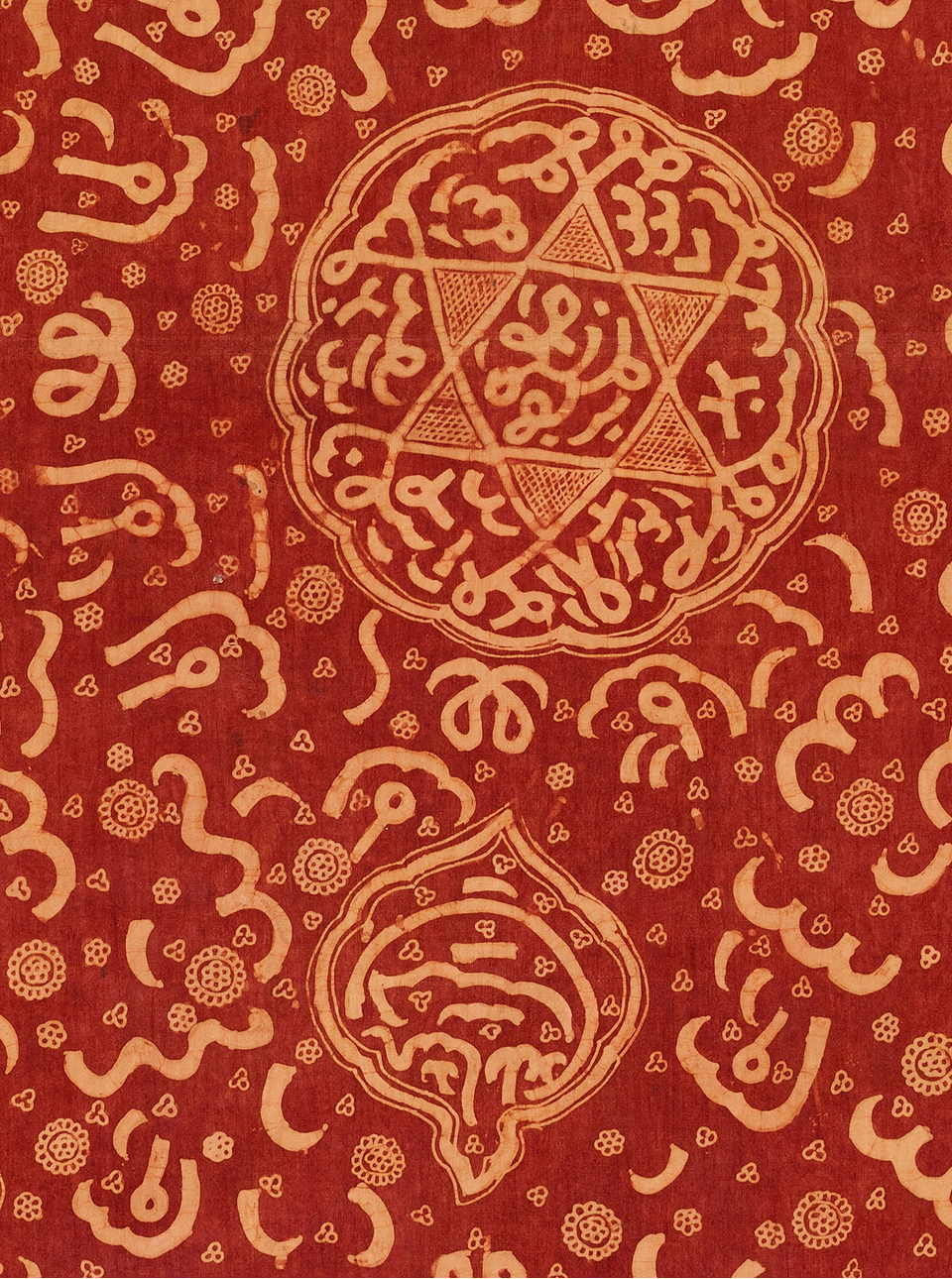
Detail of a Kain Batik Tulisan, late 19th century, from an unknown village in Jambi.

- Kerinci Seblat National Park

The largest of the three national parks comprising the Tropical Rainforest Heritage of Sumatra, Kerinci Seblat has the distinction of being the second-largest national park in all of Southeast Asia, only after Lorentz National Park on Papua. It is one of the Sumatran Tiger's last strongholds on the island, and within its borders sits the highest active volcano in Southeast Asia - Mount Kerinci.

- Muaro Jambi Temple Compounds

May 2011: The Jambi provincial administration is striving to have the ancient Muaro Jambi temple site at Muaro Jambi village in Maro Sebo District, Muaro Jambi Regency, recognized as a World Heritage Site.

The site was a Buddhist education centre that flourished during the 7th and 8th centuries and is made from bricks similar to those used in Buddhist temples in India.

== Demographics ==
Due to transmigration policy, many ethnic groups from various parts of Indonesia, especially Java, Borneo, Sulawesi and other parts of Sumatra brought their native languages as well. The non-Pribumi (non-Native Indonesian ethnicities) people such as the Chinese Indonesians speak several varieties of Chinese.

Ethnically, the population comprises:

- 38% Jambi Malay
- 20% Javanese
- 10.2% Chinese
- 10% Kerinci
- 31.8% other

The Kerinci people live in the western part of the province, specifically in the regencies of Kerinci, Merangin, Bungo and the city of Sungai Penuh. Besides Jambi Province, Kerinci communities can also be found in neighbouring West Sumatra. As of 2022, Islam is the largest religion in Jambi, being practised by 96.09% of the population. Minority religions are Christianity with 3,9%, Buddhism 0.92%, Confucianism 0.02% and Hinduism 0.01% of the population.

== See also ==
- Putri Tangguk, a Malay traditional folklore originated from Jambi
