= List of national parks of Indonesia =

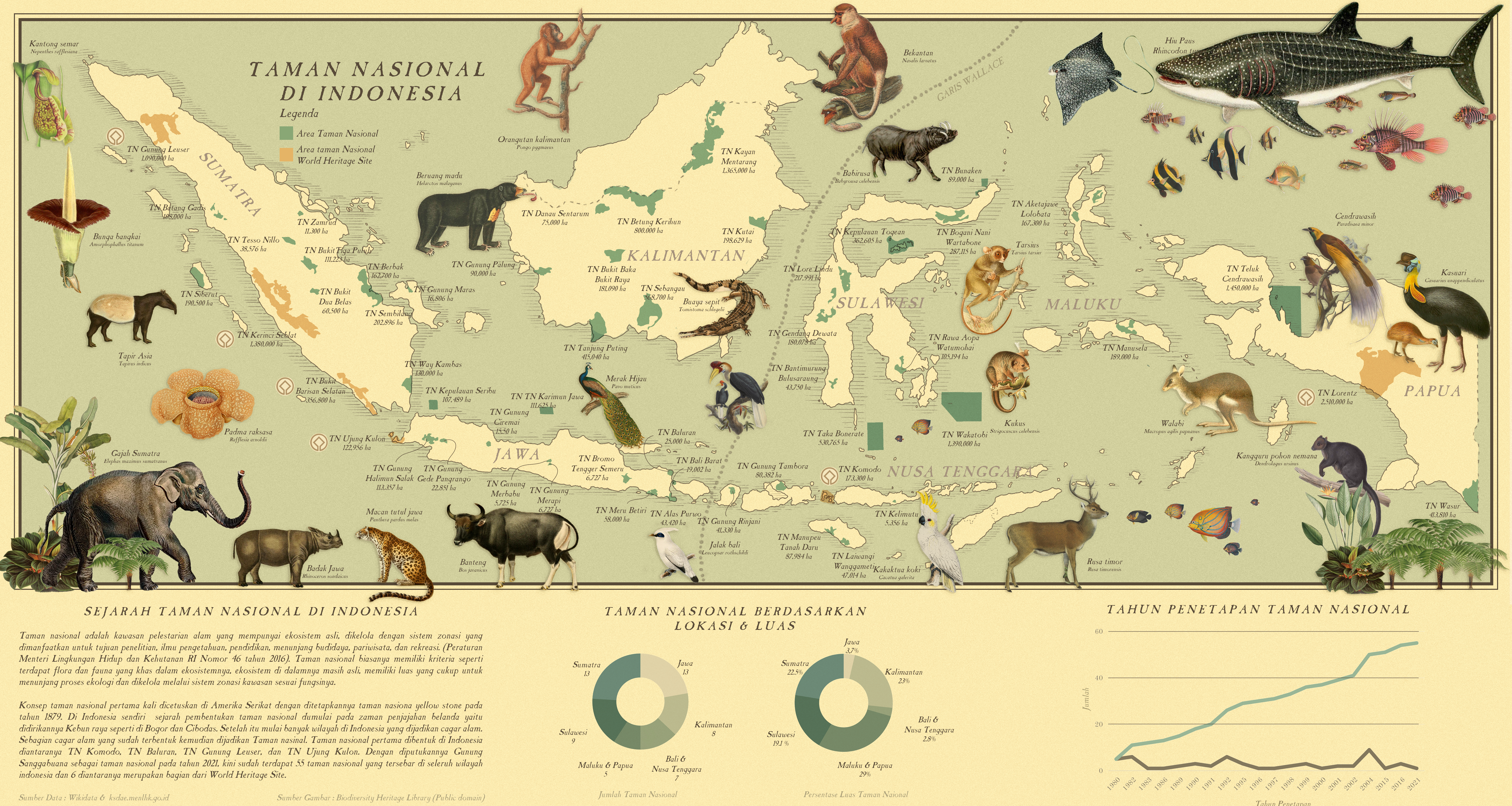
National parks in Indonesia

Of Indonesia's 57 national parks, six are World Heritage Sites, nine are part of the World Network of Biosphere Reserves and five are wetlands of international importance under the Ramsar convention. A total of 9 parks are largely marine. Around 9% of Indonesia's land area is protected (less than the 25% in Germany or the 33% in France), which also includes national parks.

The first group of five Indonesian national parks were established in 1980. This number increased constantly reaching 41 in 2003. In a major expansion in 2004, nine more new national parks were created, raising the total number to 50. Mount Tambora was added in 2015. 3 more National Parks in Sumatra, Sulawesi, and Bangka Island were declared in 2016. Mamberamo Foja in Papua is the youngest national park in Indonesia after its new status announced in 2024.

== Java ==
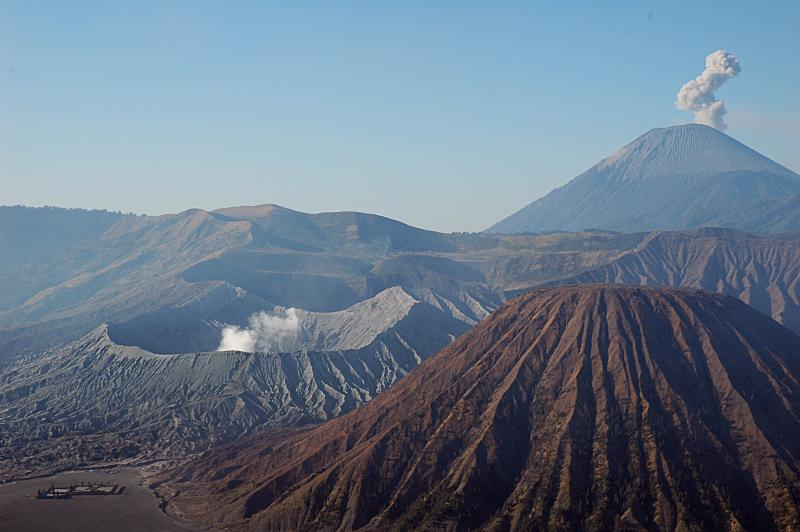
Bromo Tengger Semeru National Park

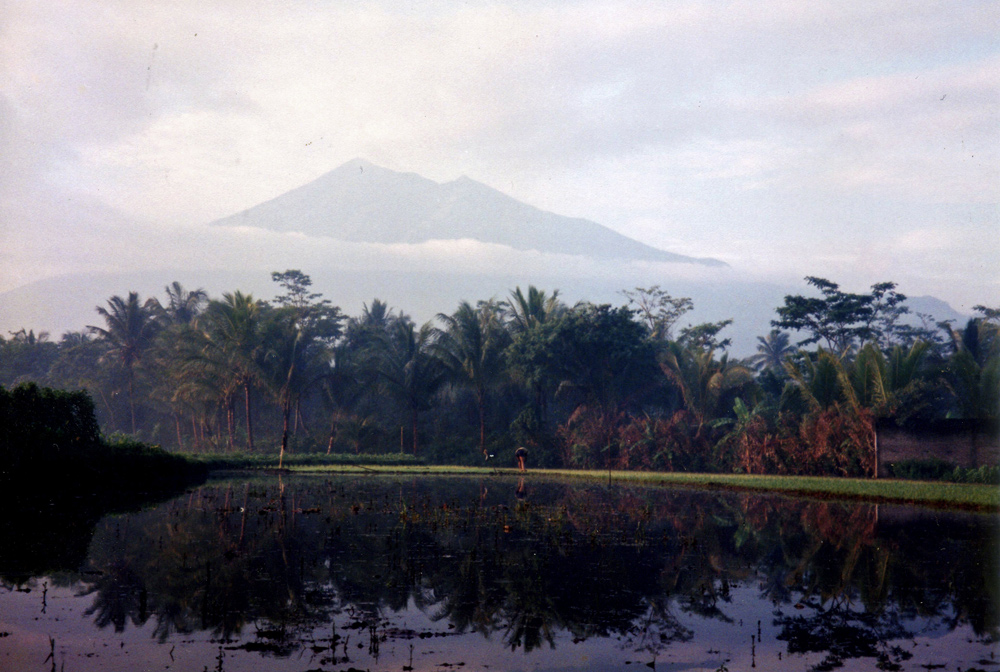
Gunung Merbabu National Park

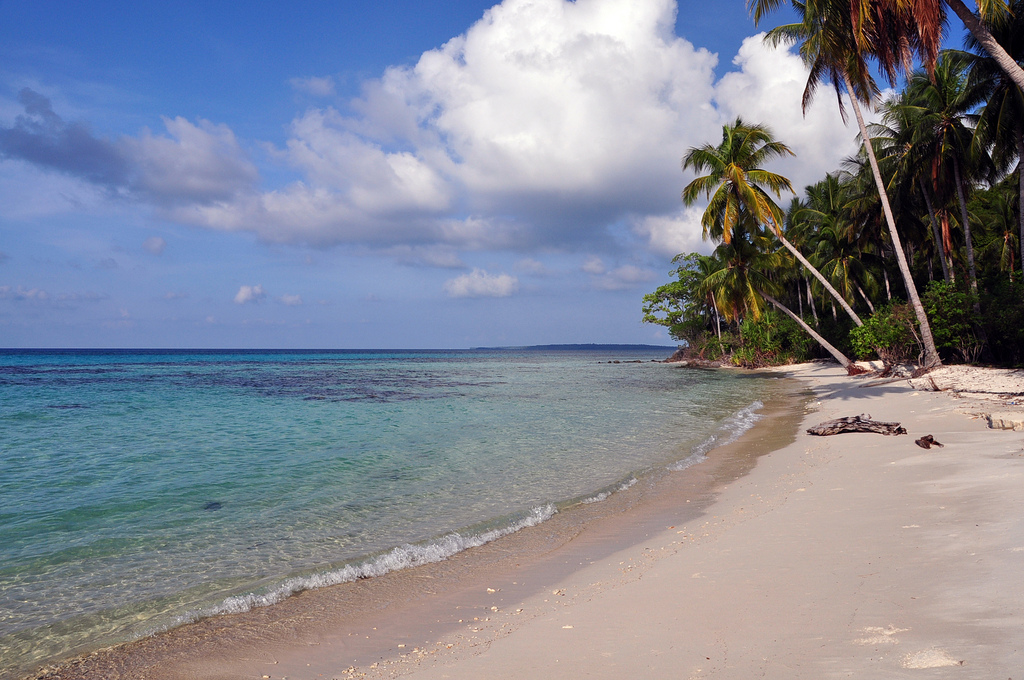
Karimunjawa National Park

Name	Year	Total Area		Marine area	International status
Name	Year	km²	mi²	Marine area	International status
Alas Purwo	1992	434	168		
Baluran	1980	250	96		
Bromo Tengger Semeru	1983	503	194		World Network of Biosphere Reserves
Mount Ciremai	2004	155	60		
Mount Gede Pangrango	1980	150	58		World Network of Biosphere Reserves
Mount Halimun Salak	1992	400	150		
Mount Merapi	2004	64	25		
Mount Merbabu	2004	57	21		
Karimunjawa	1986	1,116	431	most	
Kepulauan Seribu	1982	1,080	420	most	
Meru Betiri	1982	580	224		
Ujung Kulon	1992	1,206	466	443 km²	World Heritage Site

National parks on and around Java

== Kalimantan ==
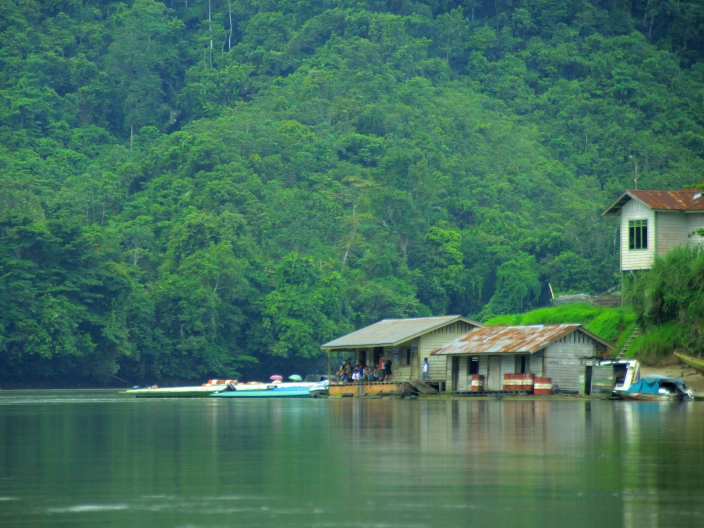
Kayan Mentarang National Park

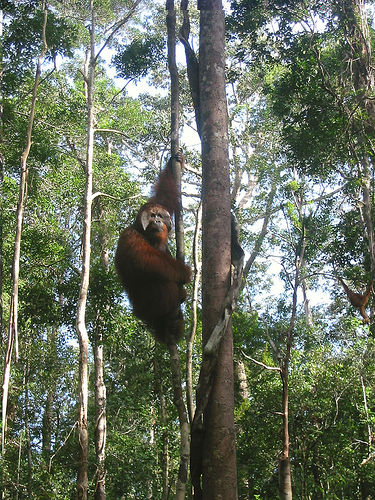
Tanjung Puting

Name	Year	Total Area		Marine area	International status
Name	Year	km²	mi²	Marine area	International status
Betung Kerihun	1995	8,000	3,100		Proposed World Heritage Site
Bukit Baka Bukit Raya	1992	1,811	699		
Danau Sentarum	1999	1,320	510		Ramsar site
Gunung Palung	1990	900	350		
Kayan Mentarang	1996	13,605	5,252		
Kutai	1982	1,986	767		
Sabangau	2004	5,687	2,196		
Tanjung Puting	1982	4,150	1,370		World Network of Biosphere Reserves

National parks on Kalimantan (Indonesian Borneo)

== Lesser Sunda Islands ==
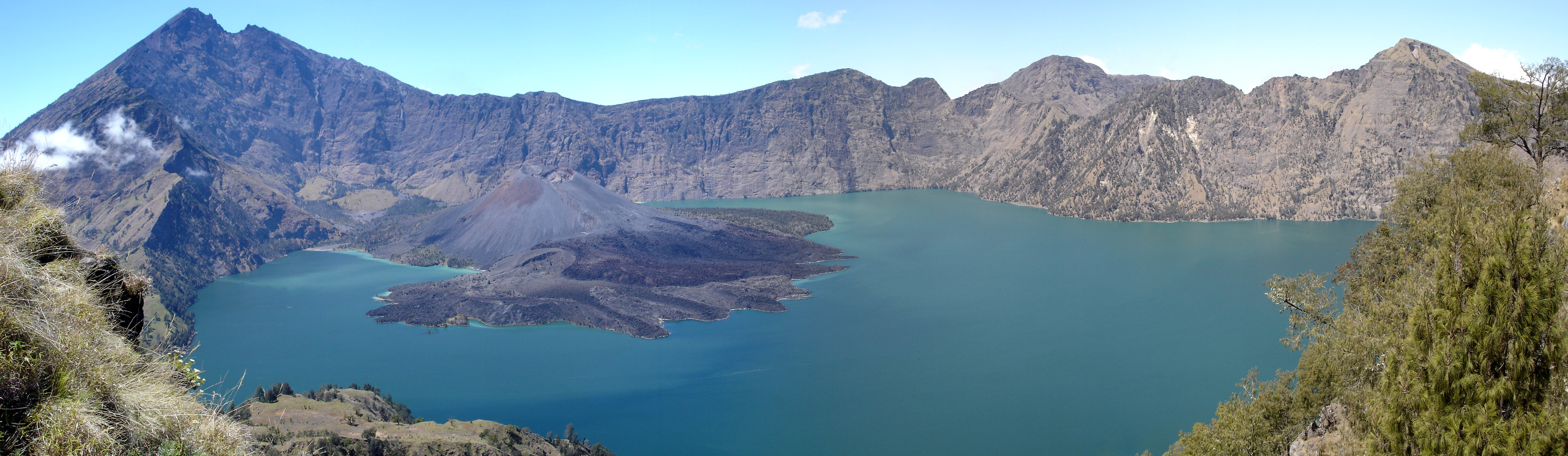
Gunung Rinjani National Park

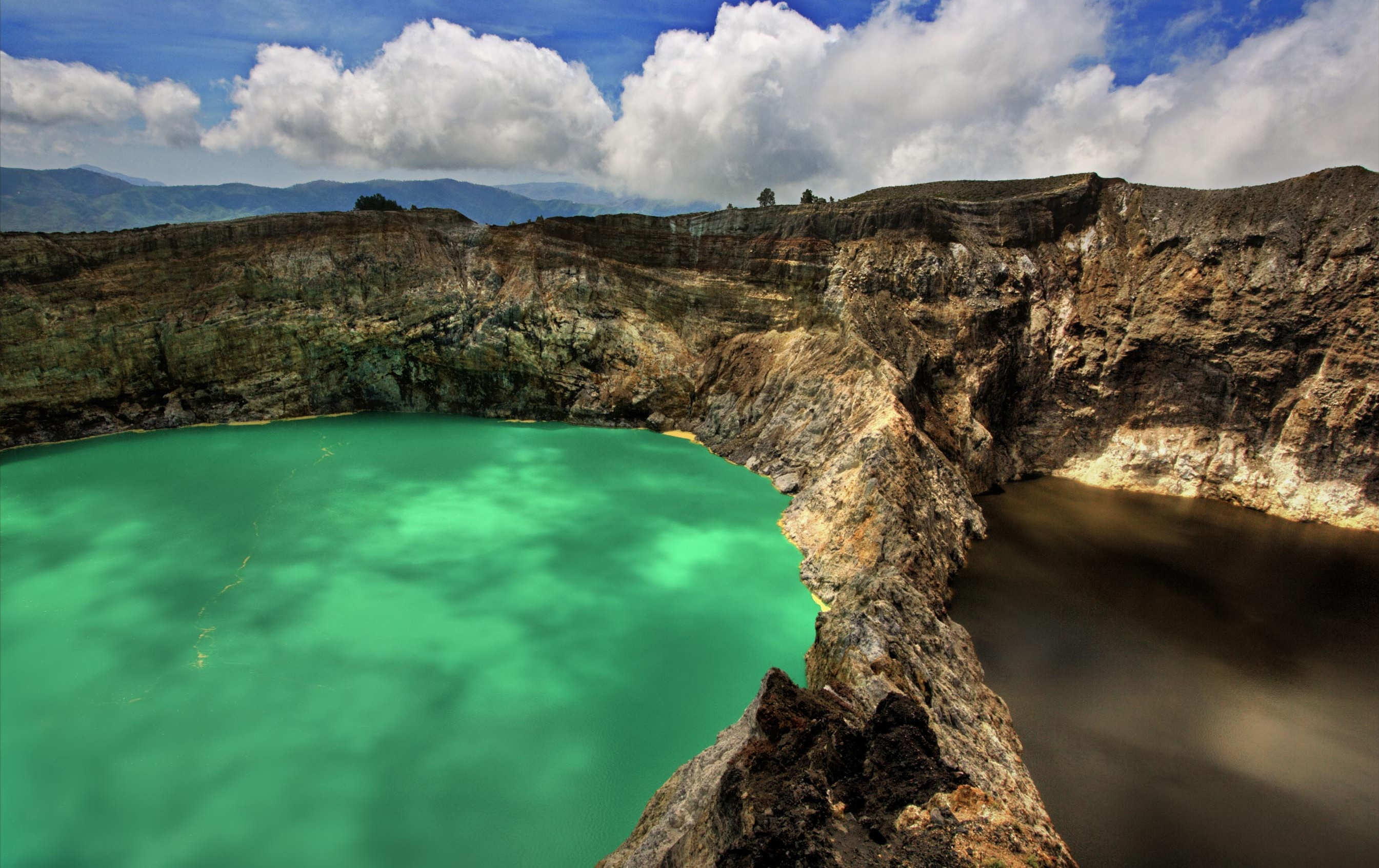
Kelimutu National Park

Name	Year	Total Area		Marine area	International status
Name	Year	km²	mi²	Marine area	International status
Bali Barat	1995	190	73		
Gunung Rinjani	1990	413	159		
Kelimutu	1992	50	20		
Komodo	1980	1,817	701	66%	World Heritage Site; World Network of Biosphere Reserves
Laiwangi Wanggameti	1998	470	180		
Manupeu Tanah Daru	1998	880	340		
Mount Tambora	2015	716	276		
Moyo Satonda	2022	312	120		
Mutis Timau	2024	788	304		

National parks in the Lesser Sunda Islands

== Maluku and Papua ==
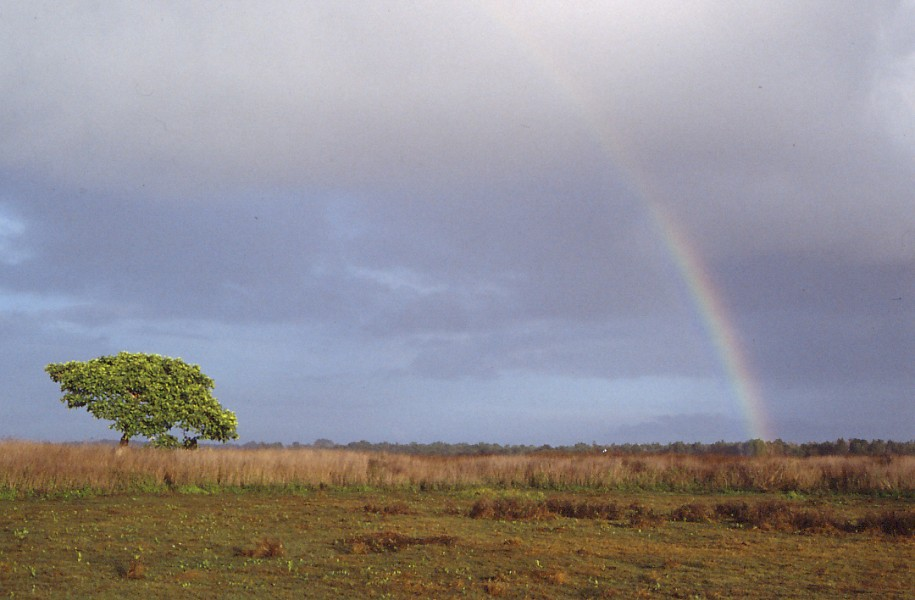
Wasur National Park

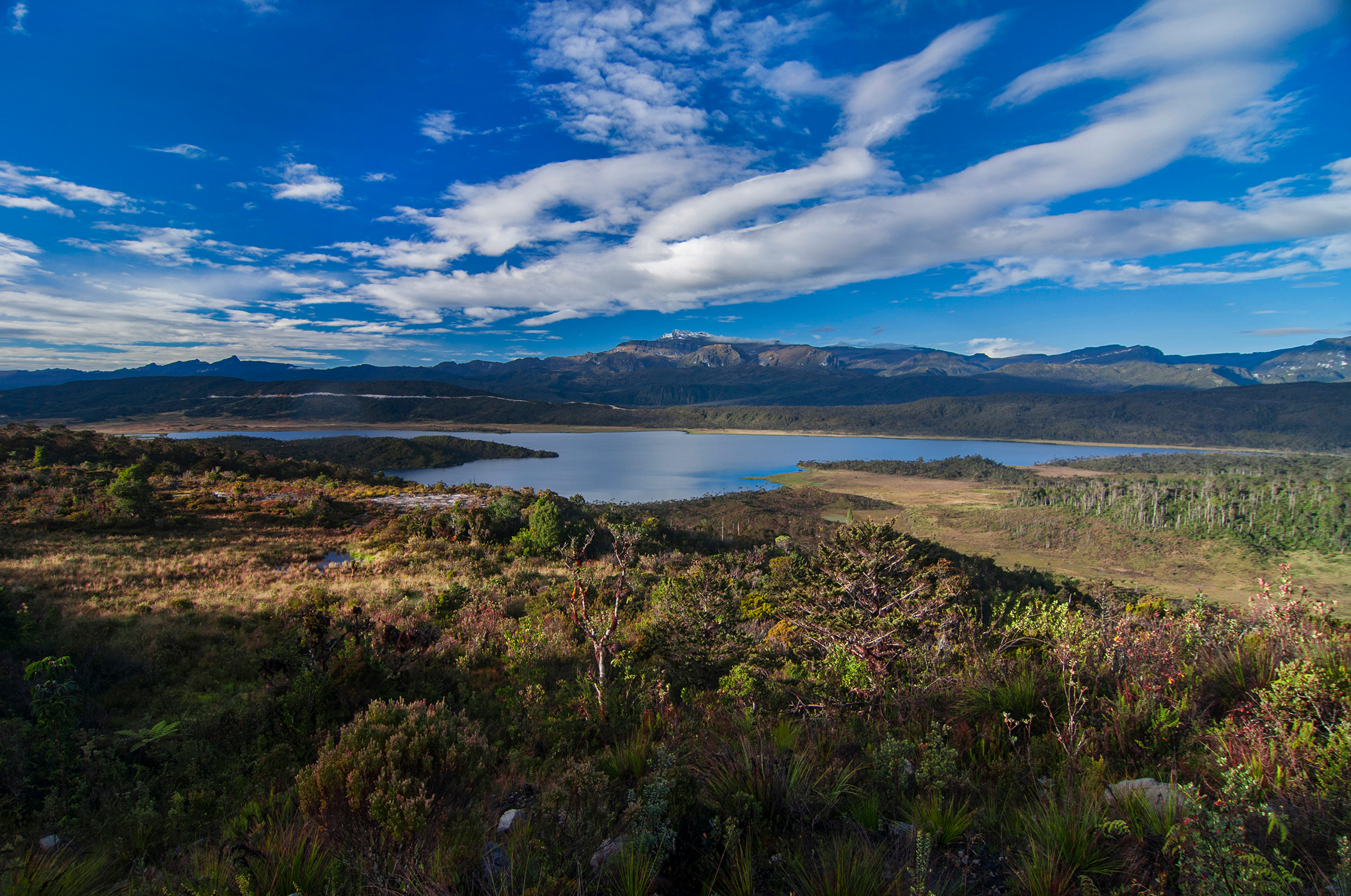
Lorentz National Park

Name	Year	Total Area		Marine area	International status
Name	Year	km²	mi²	Marine area	International status
Aketajawe-Lolobata	2004	1,673	646		
Lorentz	1997	25,050	9,670		World Heritage Site
Mamberamo Foja	2024	16,610	6,410		
Manusela	1982	1,890	729		
Teluk Cenderawasih	2002	14,535	5,611	90%	
Wasur	1990	4,138	1598		Ramsar site

National parks on Maluku and Indonesian Papua

== Sulawesi ==
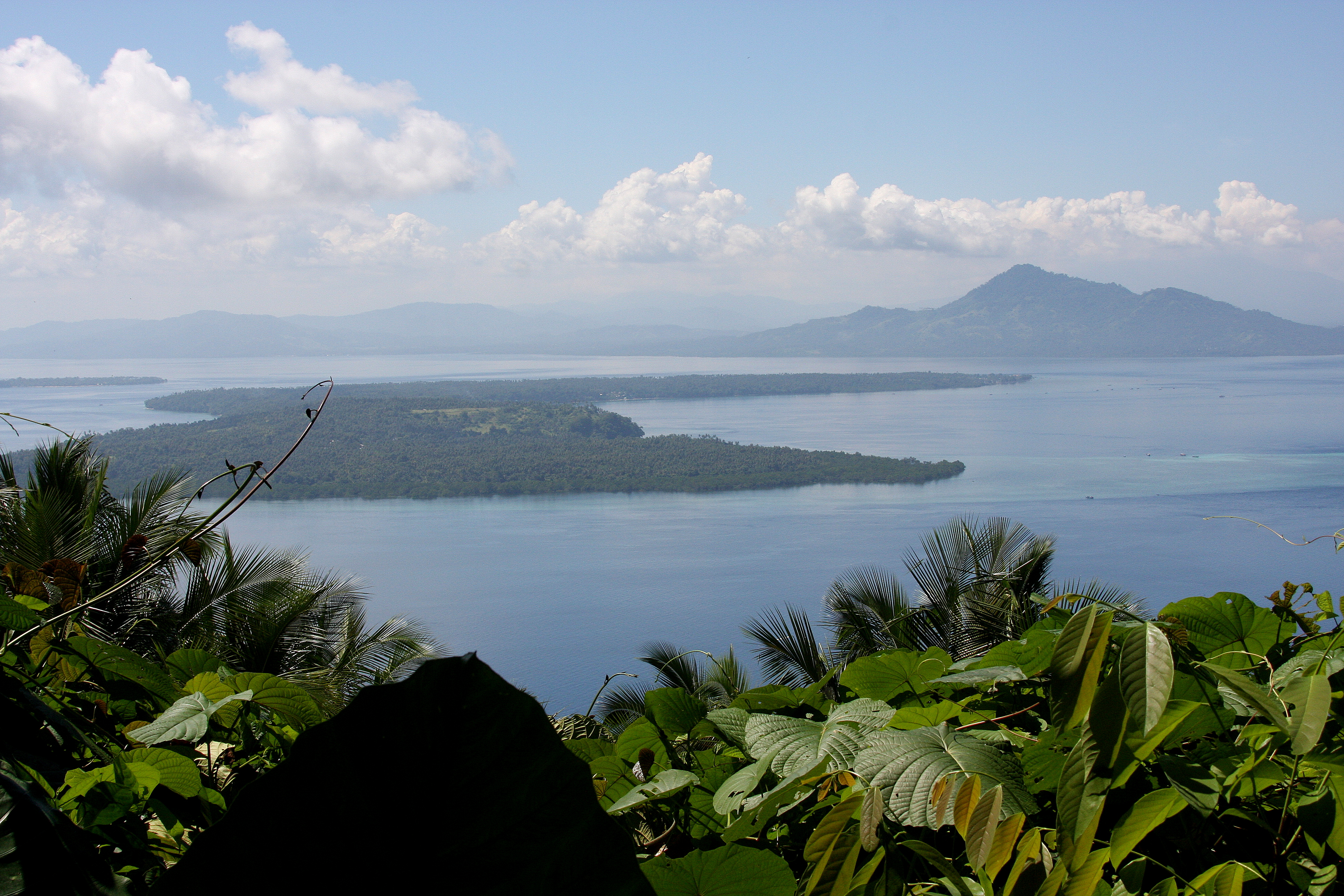
Bunaken National Park

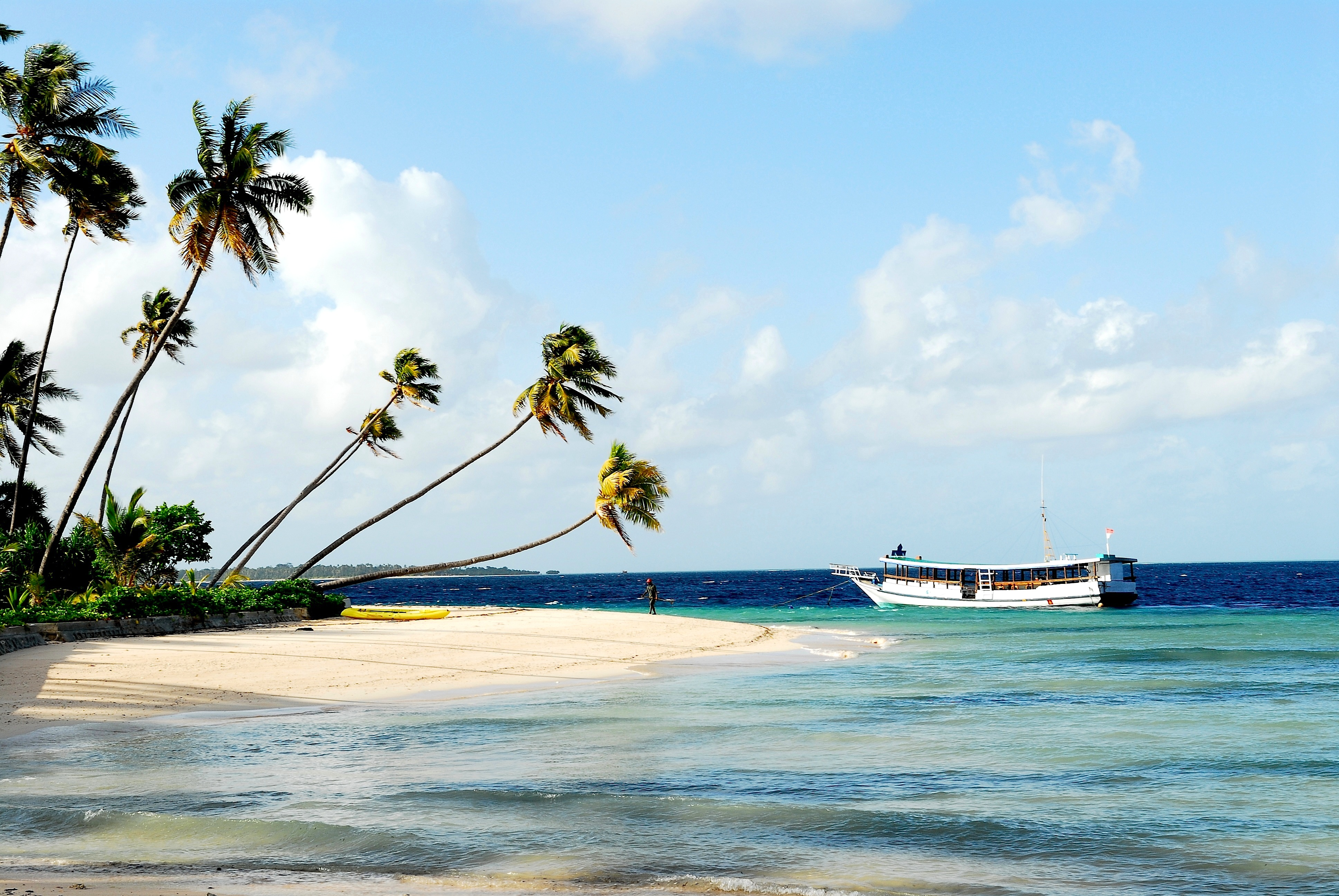
Wakatobi National Park

Name	Year	Total Area		Marine area	International status
Name	Year	km²	mi²	Marine area	International status
Bantimurung-Bulusaraung	2004	480	185		
Bogani Nani Wartabone	1991	2,871	1,108		
Bunaken	1991	890	342	97%	Proposed World Heritage Site
Gandang Dewata	2016	793	306		
Kepulauan Togean	2004	3,620	1,400	700 km²	
Lore Lindu	1982	2,290	884		World Network of Biosphere Reserves
Rawa Aopa Watumohai	1989	1,052	406		Ramsar site
Taka Bone Rate	2001	5,308	2,049	most	World Network of Biosphere Reserves; Proposed World Heritage Site
Wakatobi	2002	13,900	5,370	most	World Network of Biosphere Reserves; Proposed World Heritage Site

National parks on and around Sulawesi

== Sumatra ==
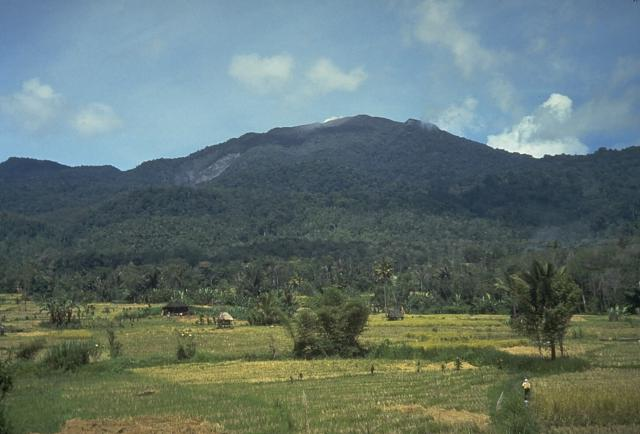
Batang Gadis National Park

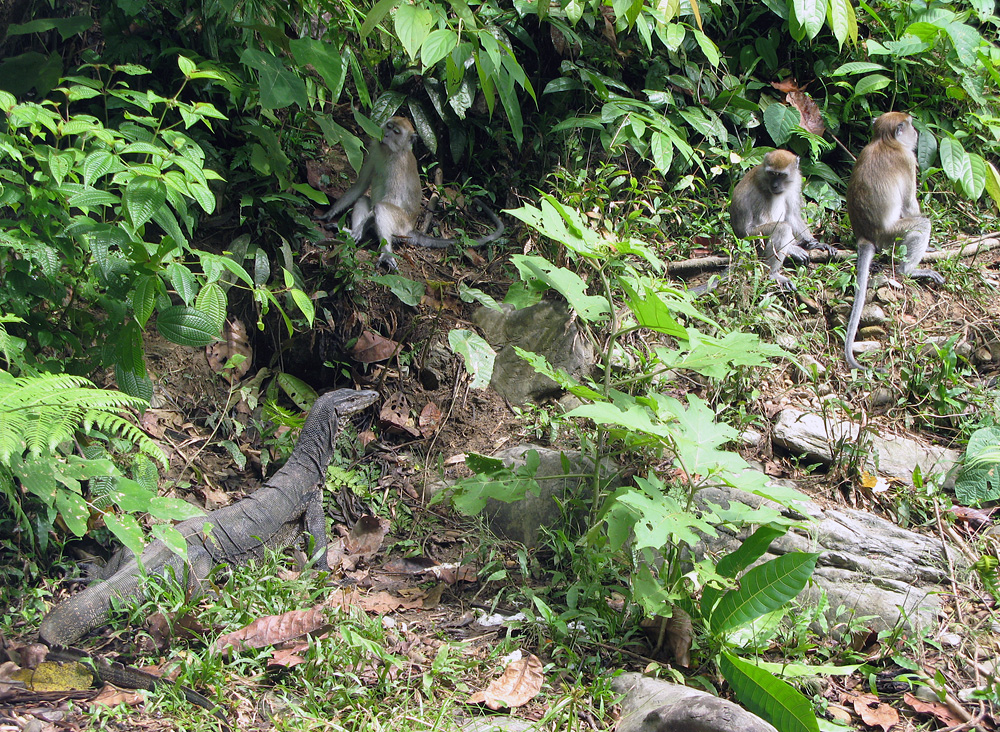
Gunung Leuser National Park

Name	Year	Total Area		Marine area	International status
Name	Year	km²	mi²	Marine area	International status
Batang Gadis	2004	1,080	417		
Berbak	1992	1,628	628		Ramsar site
Bukit Barisan Selatan	1982	3,650	1410		World Heritage Site unit
Bukit Duabelas	2000	605	233		
Bukit Tigapuluh	1995	1,277	493		
Gunung Leuser	1980	7,927	3,061		World Heritage Site unit World Network of Biosphere Reserves
Kerinci Seblat	1999	13,750	5,310		World Heritage Site unit
Sembilang	2001	2,051	792		Ramsar site
Siberut	1992	1,905	735		World Network of Biosphere Reserves
Tesso Nilo	2004	1,000	386		
Way Kambas	1989	1,300	500		
Zamrud	2016	314	121		
Mount Maras	2016	168	65		

National parks on Sumatra and nearby islands

== See also ==
- Protected areas of Indonesia
