= Gandang Dewata National Park =

National park in Mamasa Regency, West Sulawesi, Indonesia

- IUCN category II (national park)
- Location within Sulawesi
- Location: Mamasa Regency, West Sulawesi, Indonesia
- Nearest city: Mamasa
- Coordinates: 2.949487°S 119.450912°E-2.960459,
- Area: 79,342 hectares (793.42 km^{2})
- Established: 2016
- Governing body: Ministry of Environment and Forestry

Gandang Dewata National Park (Taman Nasional Gandang Dewata in Indonesian language) is located in the Mamasa Regency of West Sulawesi province of Indonesia, with Tanete Gandangdewata (3,074 meters) and its mountain range at its core. The mountain range, considered sacred by the local community, covers an area of 214,201 hectares.

Indonesian Institute of Sciences (LIPI) research in 2013 showed that Gandang Dewata is a habitat for a number of endemic bird species, and even found a number of new species that need to be maintained.

== Etymology ==
Gandang Dewata, 'the drum of God', is composed of two words. Gandang, from the local Mamasa language, means 'drum'; dewata, from Sanskrit, means 'God'. Tanete, the peak of Gandang Dewata, looks like a large round stone, from a distance appearing like a giant drum.

== History ==
In 2016, the Indonesian Ministry of Environment and Forestry designated 189,208.17 hectares of the mountain as Indonesia's 53rd national park, to safeguard its high biodiversity.

== Flora and fauna ==
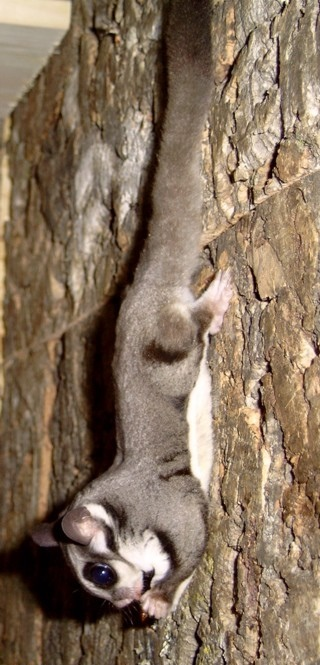
Sugar gliders' hind feet are adapted to firmly grasp surfaces such as this rock wall.

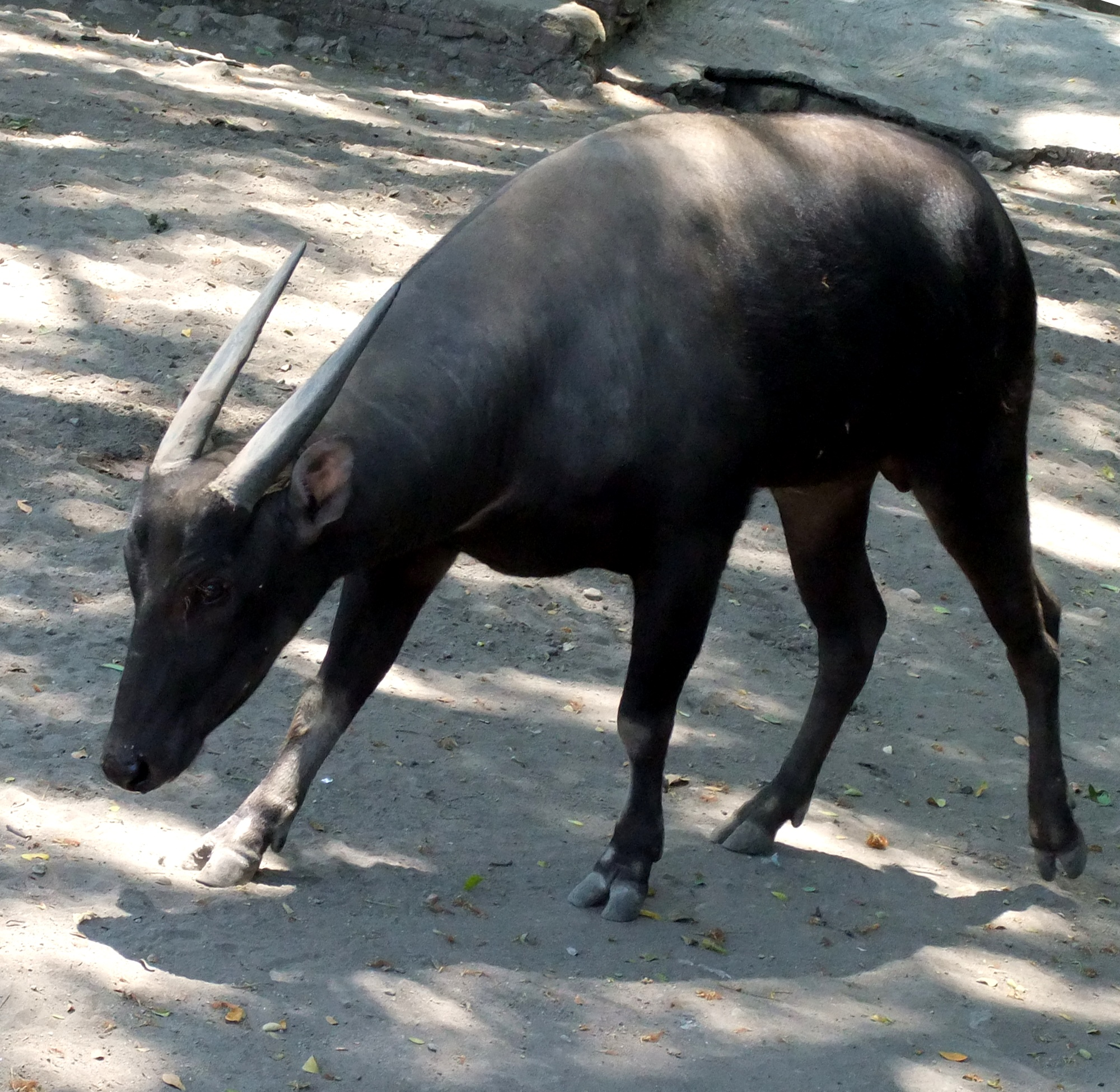
Lowland or Sulawesi Anoa.

Tanete Gendangdewata mountain is notable for its diverse flora and fauna, including the common sugar glider (small nocturnal gliding possum) and the rare Sulawesi anoa (dwarf buffalo).

While some Sulawesian bird species are shared with neighboring islands like Borneo, 31% of Sulawesi’s birds are found nowhere else. Sulawesi is home to eight national parks, showcasing diverse ecosystems. Four are primarily marine parks: Bunaken National Park, renowned for its coral reefs and diverse marine life; Taka Bone Rate National Park, the largest coral atoll in Southeast Asia; Kepulauan Togean National Park, with pristine coral reefs and unique marine ecosystems; and Moyo Satonda National Park, known for its coral reefs and volcanic lakes. The land-based parks include: Bogani Nani Wartabone National Park, a crucial conservation site for Sulawesi's wildlife, home to the endangered anoa and cinnabar hawk owl; Lore Lindu National Park, a UNESCO Biosphere Reserve, sheltering numerous endemic species such as the Tonkean macaque, maleo, and various tarsiers; Rawa Aopa Watumohai National Park, encompassing wetlands and important habitats; and Gandang Dewata National Park, preserving pristine forests. These parks protect a range of endemic species, including the maleo bird, anoa, babirusa, various tarsier species, and unique flora and fauna adapted to Sulawesi's diverse environments.

== Tourism ==
Despite its underdeveloped infrastructure, the province exhibits significant tourism potential, highlighted by the recent establishment of Gandang Dewata National Park, which preserves endemic Wallacean species and Sulawesi's remaining pristine forest. Some of the attractions in and around the Gandang Dewata National Park include the following:

- Bata Waterfall
- Buttuada Waterfall
- Hernon Hill
- Mambuliling Peak
- Samababo Waterfall
- Talepom Bulam Peak

== Mountain climbing ==
Tanete Gandangdewata peak, the Quarles Range's highest peak and a remote summit marked by a triangulation pole, is a mountain-climbing destination. The northern Tanete Gandangdewata peak is 3,037 m high and the southern Tanete Gandangdewata peak is 2,966 m. Puncak Mistis peak (3,037 m) is northeast of Tanete Gandangdewata peak. There are two multi-day routes to summit Tanete Gandangdewata.

== Economy ==
The region's economy relies on agriculture, including cocoa and palm oil, alongside mineral deposits of nickel, thorium, and uranium, with detected radiation levels prompting further investigation. While the province experiences above-average growth, a substantial portion of the population engages in subsistence farming, and a significant number of villages lack electricity.

== See also ==
- List of national parks of Indonesia
- List of mountains in Indonesia
