= Karimunjawa National Park =

National park in Central Java, Indonesia

- Taman Nasional Karimunjawa
- IUCN category II (national park)
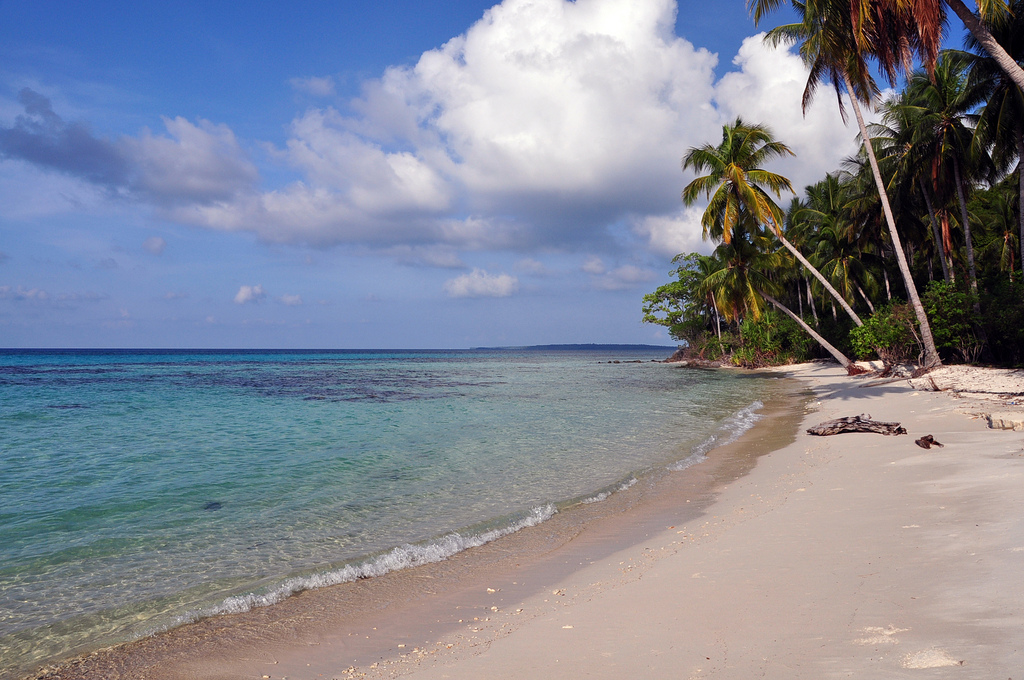
- Tanjung Gelam, one of the beaches in Karimunjawa

- Location within Java
- Location: Karimunjawa Islands, Jepara Regency, Central Java, Indonesia
- Nearest city: Jepara
- Coordinates: 5°49′S 110°24′E
- Area: 110,117 hectares (272,110 acres; 1,101.17 km^{2}) (including land)
- Established: 2001
- Visitors: 1,951 (in 2007)
- Governing body: Ministry of Environment and Forestry

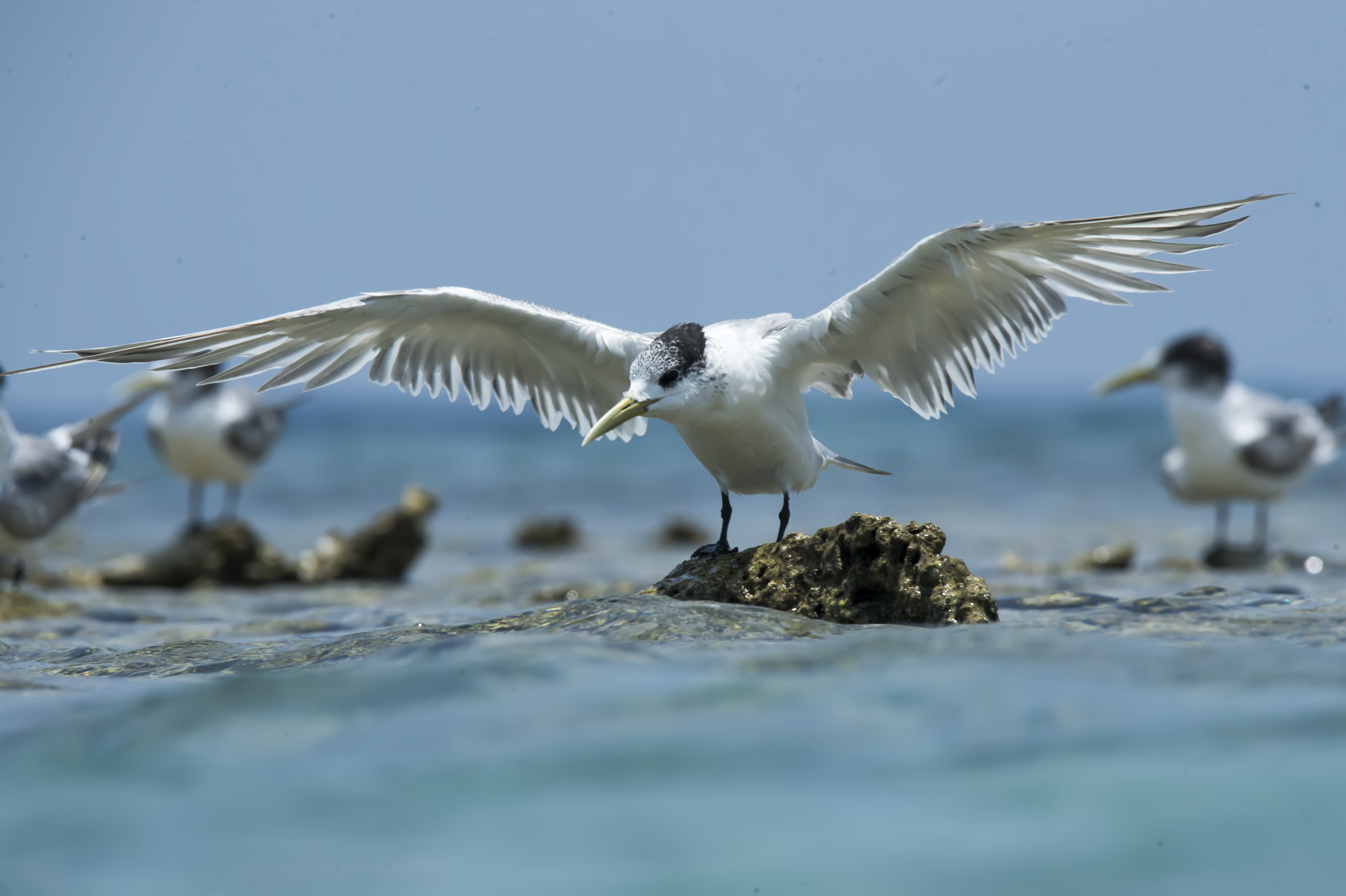
Thalasseus bergii in the park

Karimunjawa National Park, also Crimon Java National Park, is a national marine park designated in the Karimun Java archipelago, Jepara Regency, Central Java, Indonesia. It lies 80 km north west of Jepara, Central Java in the Java Sea. The national park was formally declared as Marine Protection Area in 2001.

== Ecosystem ==
=== The seagrasses and seaweeds ===
Seagrass found in the region include Chlorophyta (Coulerpa and Halimeda), Phaeophyta (Padina, Sargassum and Turbinaria) and Rhodophyta (Eucheuma, Gracilaria, Gelidium, Hypnea and Acanthopora).

=== The forests ===
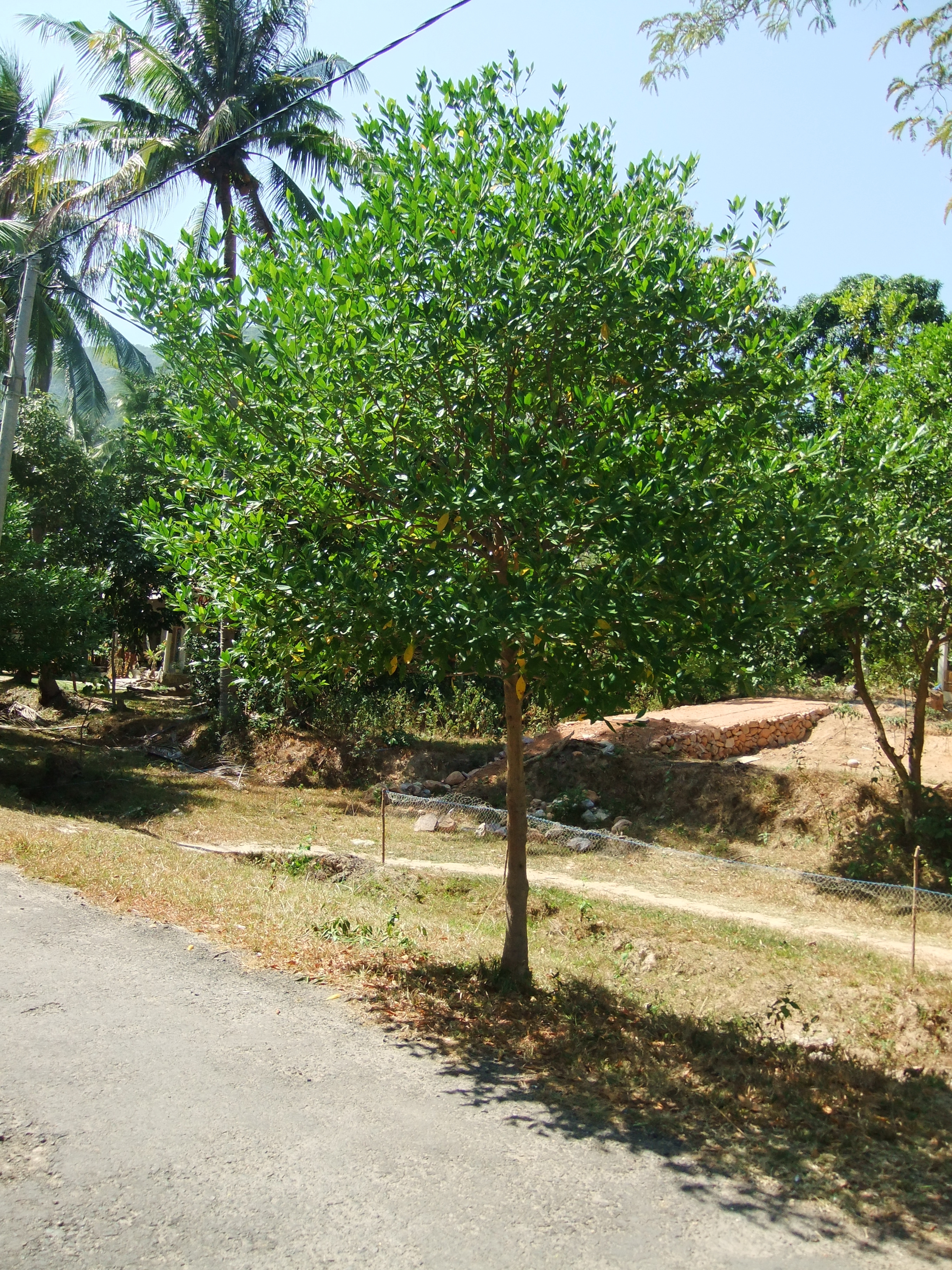
The endemic dewadaru tree whose wood is used by the locals to make various talisman objects.

Several species of turtles lay their eggs on the islands, e.g. hawksbill turtle and green turtle.

== Conservation ==
Karimunjawa Marine National Park is one of the six marine national parks in Indonesia.

== Tourism ==
There is a regular ferry and fast boat between Jepara to Karimunjawa island.

There are many hotels, hostels, homestays, and guestshouses in Karimunjawa. There is one Boutique resort close to the village and a luxury resort on its own island.

== See also ==
- List of national parks of Indonesia
- Geography of Indonesia
