= List of Indonesian provinces by highest point =

This is a list of the Indonesian provinces by highest point, including DKI Jakarta. The highest point in Indonesia is Puncak Jaya, in Central Papua, at 4,884 metres (16,024 feet), which ranks the country as 28th by highest point. Several of the peaks in the list are unnamed, and are better known by the mountain range in which they are located:

== Highest points ==
Rank	Province	Peak	Height (m)	Height (ft)
1	Central Papua	Puncak Jaya	4,884	16,024
2	Highland Papua	Puncak Mandala (Note: Controversy exists whether Puncak Mandala or Puncak Trikora is higher. Whichever is higher is the highest mountain in Highland Papua and the second-highest on the island of New Guinea.)	4,760	15,620
3	West Sumatra, Jambi	Mount Kerinci	3,805	12,480
4	West Nusa Tenggara	Mount Rinjani	3,726	12,224
5	East Java	Mount Semeru	3,676	12,060
6	South Sulawesi	Mount Latimojong	3,478	11,411
7	Aceh	Summit of Mount Leuser	3,466	11,371
8	Central Java	Mount Slamet	3,432	11,260
9	South Sumatra	Mount Dempo	3,173	10,410
10	West Java	Mount Ciremai	3,078	10,098
11	West Sulawesi	Tanete Gandang Dewata	3,074	10,085
12	Bali	Mount Agung	3,031	9,944
13	Central Sulawesi	Mount Sojol	3,030	9,940
14	Maluku	Mount Binaiya	3,027	9,931
15	West Papua	Mount Arfak	2,955	9,695
16	Yogyakarta	Mount Merapi	2,910	9,550
17	Bengkulu	Mount Patah	2,852	9,357
18	Southeast Sulawesi	Mount Mekongga	2,620	8,596
19	Southwest Papua	Bon Irau	2,501	8,205
20	North Sumatra	Mount Sinabung	2,460	8,070
21	East Nusa Tenggara	Mount Mutis	2,427	7,963
22	Central Kalimantan	Bukit Raya	2,278	7,474
23	Lampung	Mount Pesagi	2,262	7,421
24	North Kalimantan	Batu Jumak	2,250	7,382
25	East Kalimantan	Mount Liangpran	2,240	7,349
26	Gorontalo	Mount Tentolomatinan	2,207	7,241
27	Papua	Foja Mountains	2,193	7,195
28	North Maluku	Buku Sibela	2,111	6,926
29	West Kalimantan	Slope of Bukit Raya	2,086	6,844
30	North Sulawesi	Mount Klabat	1,995	6,545
31	Banten	Mount Halimun	1,929	6,329
32	South Kalimantan	Mount Halau-Halau	1,892	6,207
33	Riau	Mount Mandiangin	1,284	4,213
34	Riau Islands	Mount Daik	1,165	3,822
35	Bangka-Belitung	Mount Maras	699	2,293
36	Nusantara	Mount Parung	687	2,254
37	South Papua	Slope of Star Mountains	310	1,017
38	Jakarta	Unnamed location, 6°22'09.2"S 106°54'04.2"E	86	282

== See also ==
- Geography of Indonesia
