= Mount Rinjani National Park =

National park of Indonesia

- Taman Nasional Gunung Rinjani
- IUCN category II (national park)
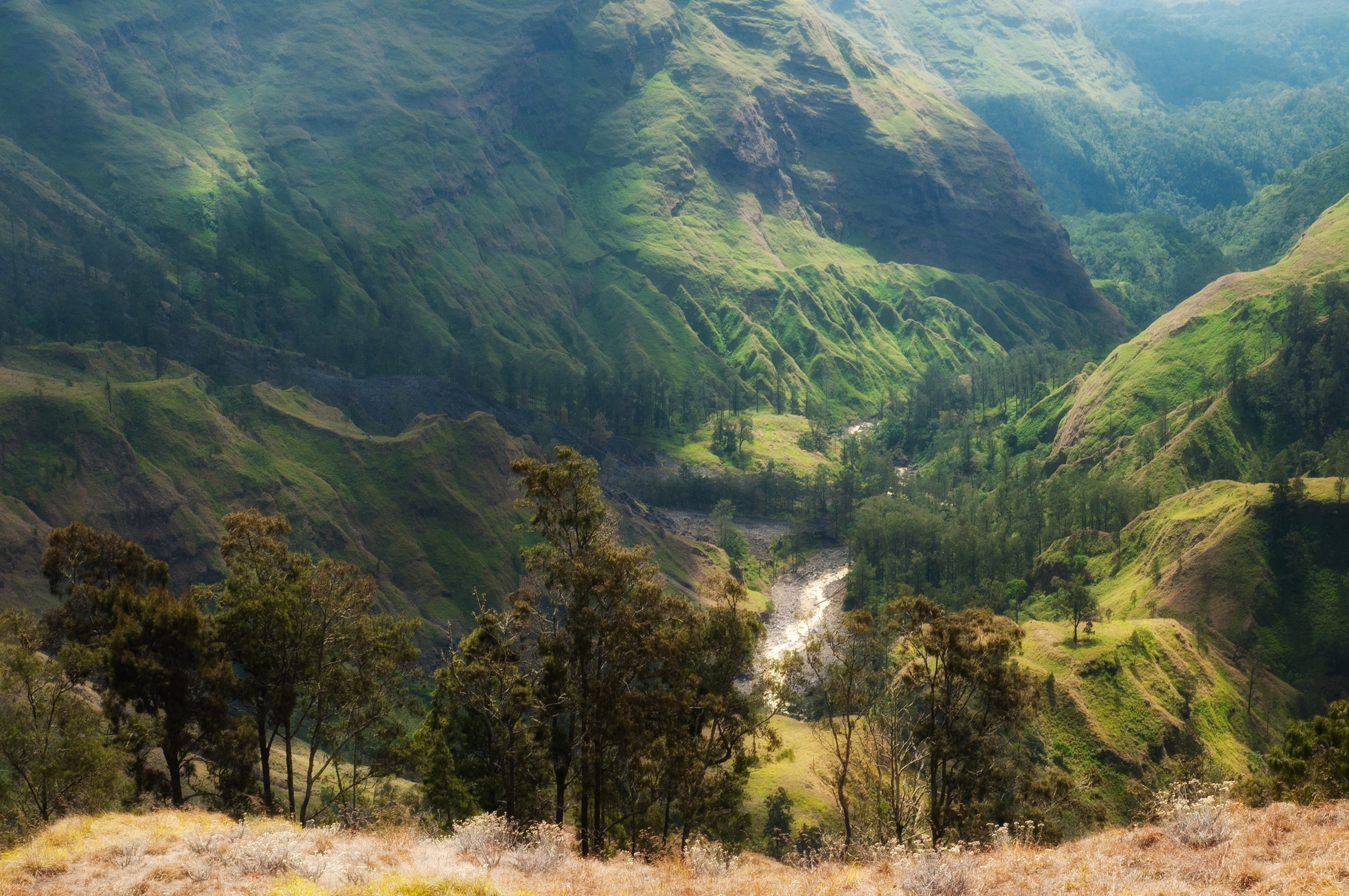
- Torean valley in Mt. Rinjani

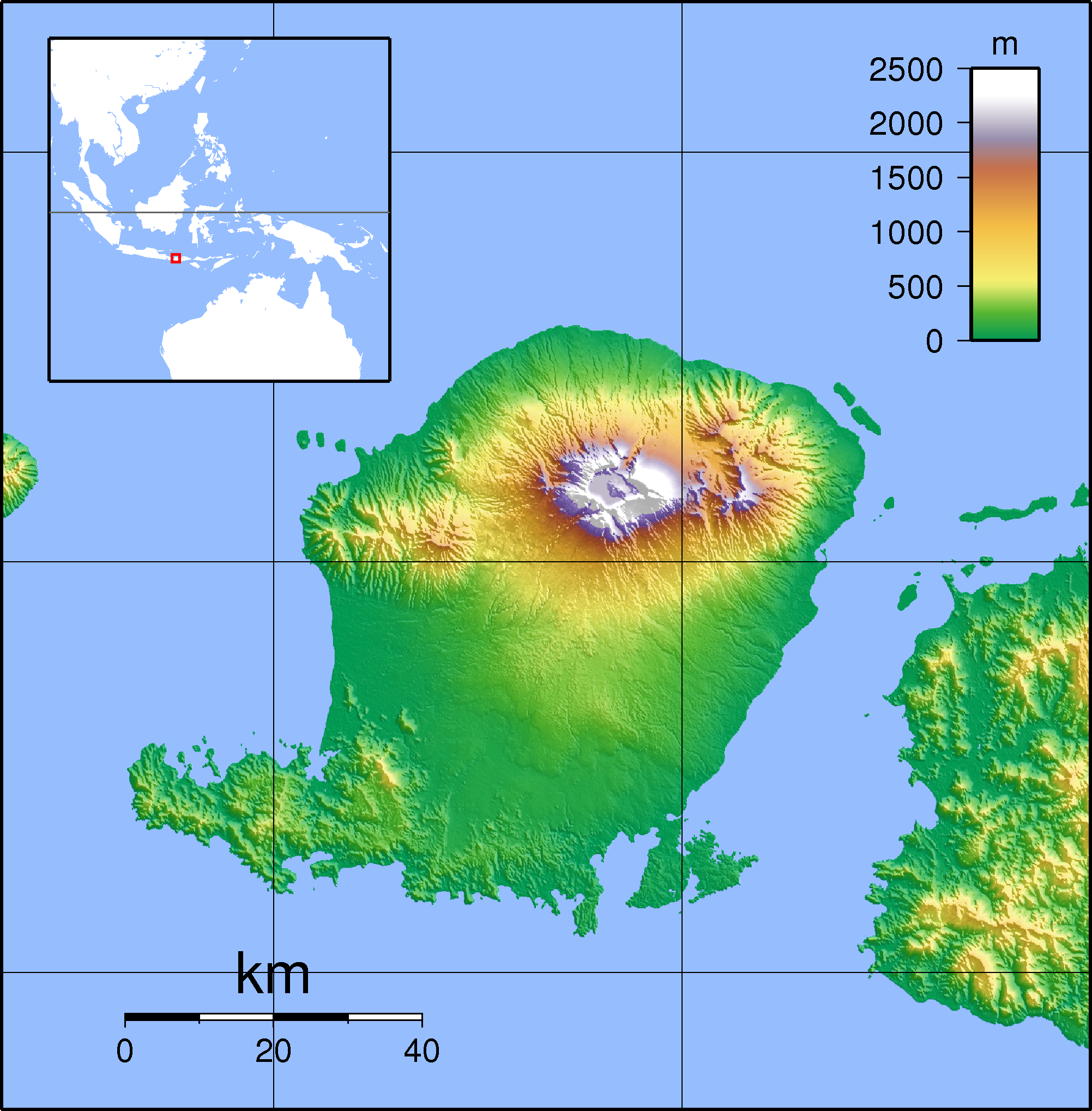
- Location within Lombok
- Location: Lombok, West Nusa Tenggara, Indonesia
- Nearest city: Mataram
- Coordinates: 8°24′29″S 116°24′58″E
- Area: 413.30 square kilometres (41,330 ha)
- Established: 1990
- Visitors: 117,715 (in 2007)
- Governing body: Ministry of Environment and Forestry
- Website: www.rinjaninationalpark.id

Mount Rinjani National Park is located on the island of Lombok, Indonesia in the North Lombok Regency. The park covers about 41,330 hectares (102,100 acres) and consists of mountainous areas. Mount Rinjani (Gunung Rinjani), which is the third highest volcano of Indonesia at 3,726 metres (12,224 ft), is located in this national park, giving this park its name.

== Flora and fauna ==
Some of endangered plants protected in this national park, such as: Pterospermum javanicum, Swietenia macrophylla, Ficus superba, Toona sureni, Vanda sp., Usnea sp and Anaphalis sp.

There are also several endangered fauna protected in this national park, including rusa deer, Indian muntjac, Sunda porcupine, surili monkeys, helmeted friarbird, several cockatoos and scaly-crowned honeyeater.

== See also ==
- List of national parks of Indonesia
- Geography of Indonesia
