= Kelimutu National Park =

National parks of Indonesia

- Taman Nasional Kelimutu
- IUCN category II (national park)
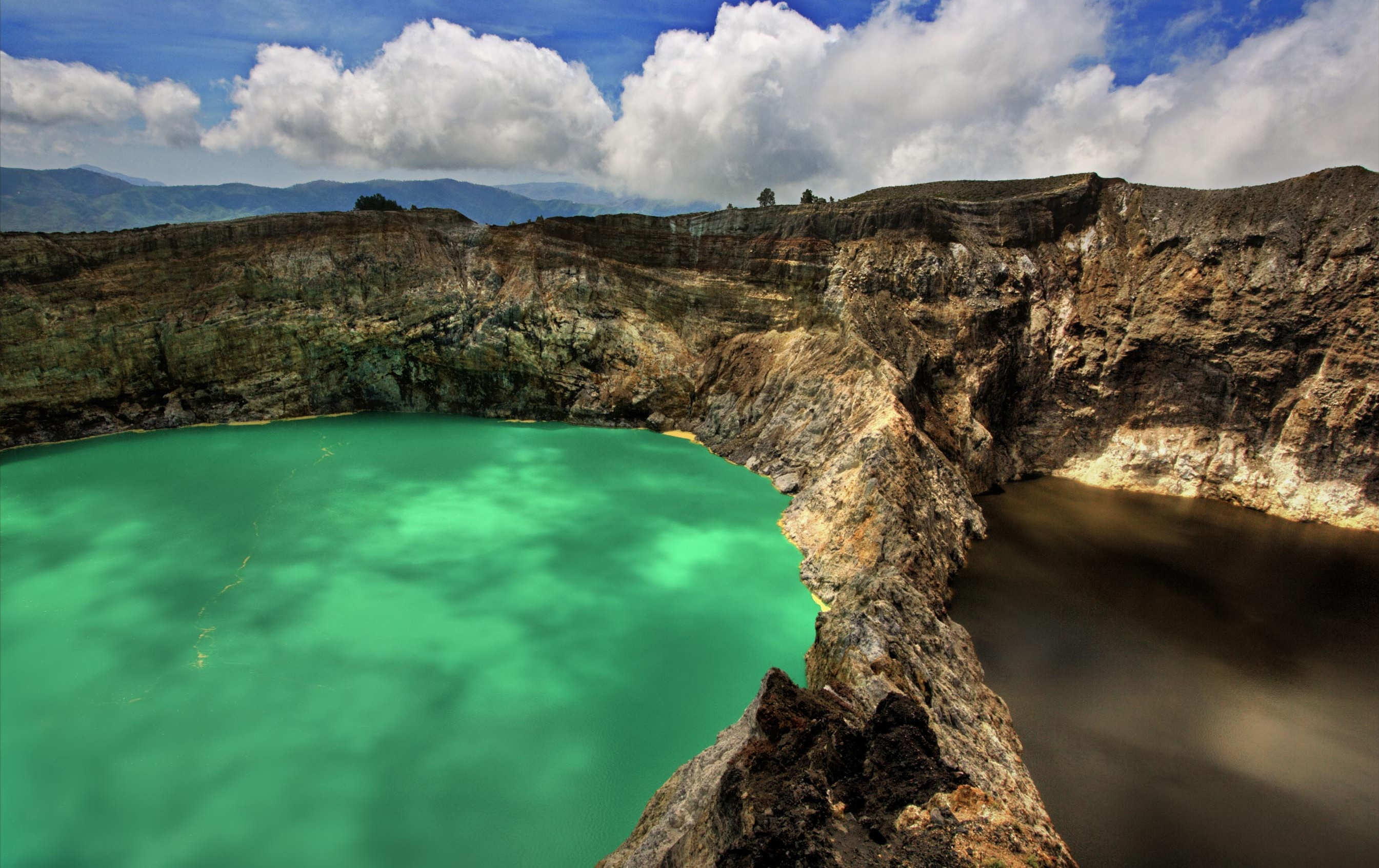
- Kelimutu lakes Tiwu Nuwa Muri Ko'o Fai and Tiwu Ata Polo

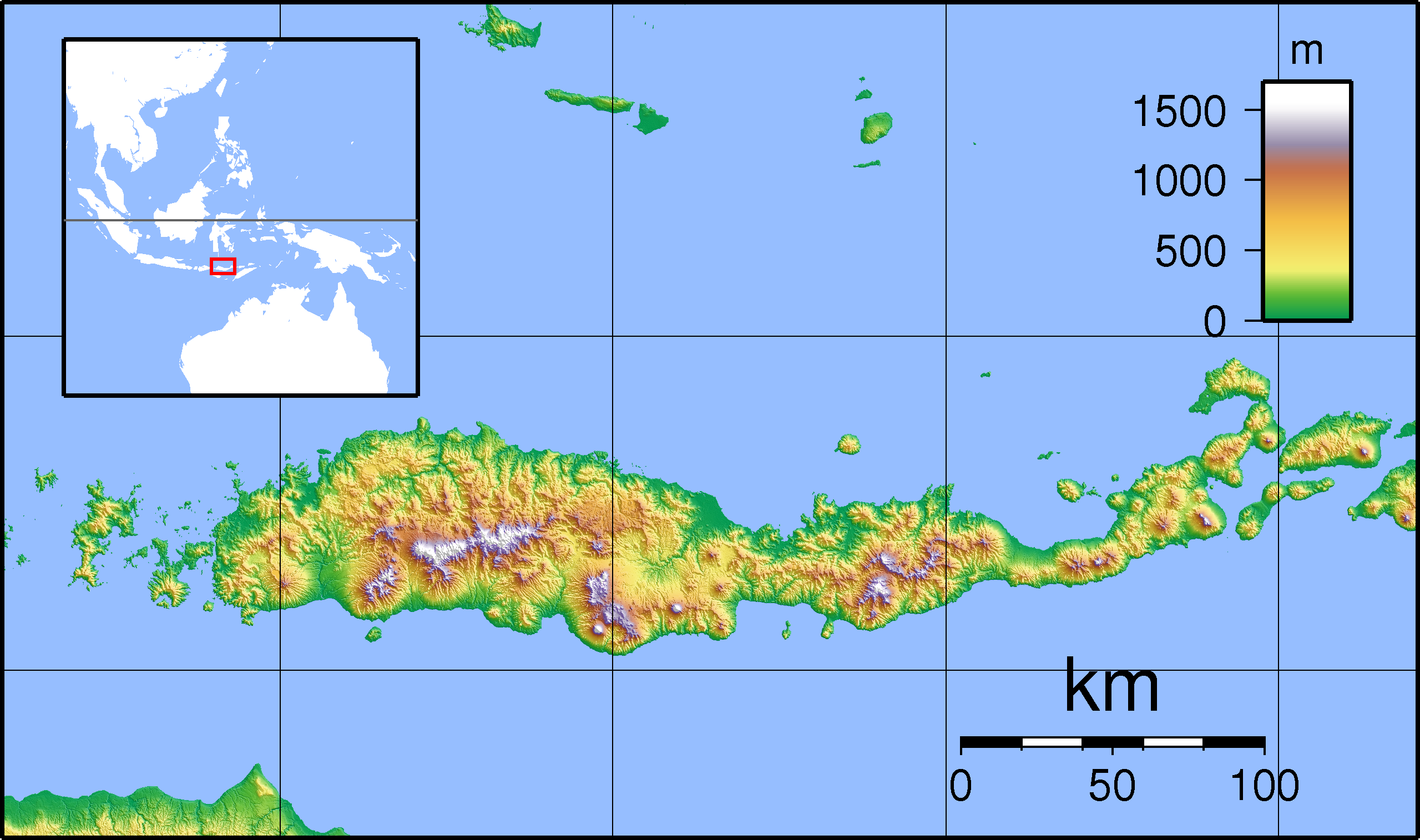
- Location within Flores
- Location: Flores, East Nusa Tenggara, Indonesia
- Coordinates: 8°45′30″S 121°50′41″E
- Area: 50 km^{2} (19 sq mi)
- Established: 1992
- Visitors: 12,507 (in 2007)
- Governing body: Ministry of Environment and Forestry

Kelimutu National Park (Indonesian: Taman Nasional Kelimutu) is located on the island of Flores, East Nusa Tenggara, Indonesia. It consists of a region with hills and mountains, with Mount Kelibara (1,731 m) as its highest peak. Mount Kelimutu, which has the three coloured lakes, is also located in this national park. This natural attraction is a destination for tourists.

Some endangered plant species are protected in this national park, such as: Toona spp., Anthocephalus cadamba, Canarium spp., Diospyros ferra, Alstonis scholaris, Schleichera oleosa, Casuarina equisetifolia and Anaphalis javanica. Some endangered animals can also be found here, such as: Javan rusa, wild boar sp., red junglefowl, Elanus sp. and drongo sp. (Dicrurus sulphurea).

The four endemic mammals in the park include two montane rodents: Bunomys naso and Hainald's rat (Rattus hainaldi).

In this area, there is also an arboretum, a mini jungle (4.5 ha) represent flora biodiversity of Kelimutu National Park. The arboretum consists of 78 types of tree plants which are grouped into 36 families. Some of the Kelimutu's endemic flora collections are uta onga (Begonia kelimutuensis), turuwara (Rhododendron renschianum), and arngoni (Vaccinium varingiaefolium).

== See also ==
- List of national parks of Indonesia
- Geography of Indonesia
- Port of Labuan Bajo
