= Laiwangi Wanggameti National Park =

National park in Indonesia

- Taman Nasional Laiwangi Wanggameti
- IUCN category II (national park)
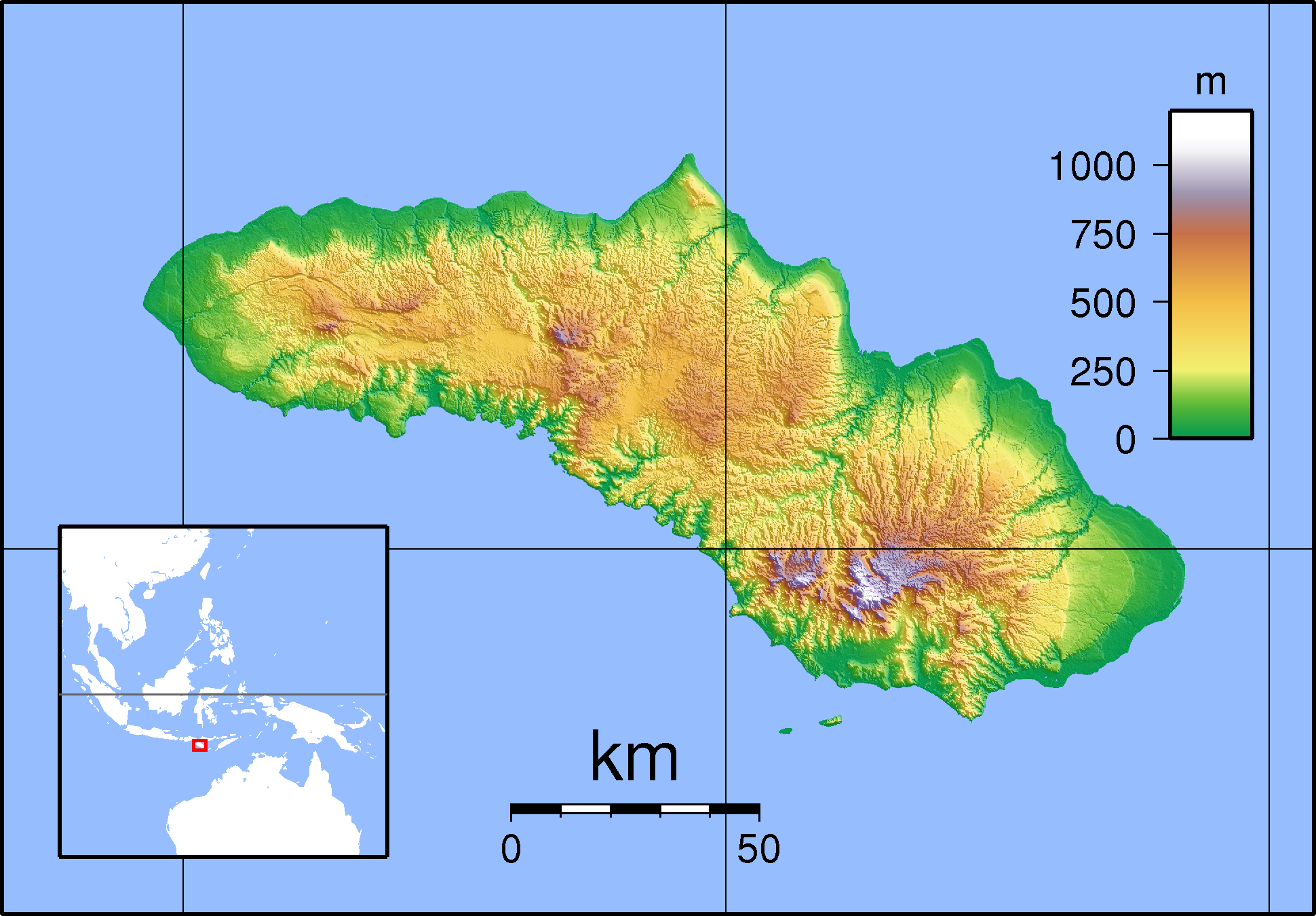
- Location within Sumba
- Location: Sumba, Indonesia
- Coordinates: 10°4′0″S 120°11′0″E
- Area: 470.14 km^{2} (181.52 sq mi)
- Established: 1998
- Governing body: Ministry of Environment and Forestry
- Website: www.tnlaiwangiwanggameti.com

Laiwangi Wanggameti National Park is located on the island of Sumba in Indonesia. All forests types that exist on this island can be found in this national park. Some endemic plant species are protected in this national park, such as Syzygium species, Alstonia scholaris, Ficus species, Canarium oleosum, Cinnamomum zeylanicum, Myristica littoralis, Toona sureni, Sterculia foetida, Schleichera oleosa, and Palaquium obovatum.

Animal species being protected in this national park include the crab-eating macaque, Sus species, water monitor, Python timoriensis, red junglefowl, red-naped fruit-dove, Sumba green pigeon, Sumba buttonquail, citron-crested cockatoo, purple-naped lory, Sumba flycatcher, Sumba cicadabird, and apricot-breasted sunbird.

== History ==
Historical records of bird surveys on Sumba are grouped into two periods based on Indonesian independence events. Namely, before and after.

In the pre-independence phase, bird exploration was first carried out in the mid-18th century. The naming of the Cacatua sulphurea citrinocristata by Fraser in 1844 and Larius roratus cornelia by Bonaparte in 1853, shows that at least two of the journal's authors had studied the Sumbanese bird a century before independence.

Next, several other researchers arrived until 1944. Ernst Mayr was the last researcher in the pre-independence era. He noted there were 121 species of birds on Sumba.

After Indonesian independence, E.R Sutter went on an expedition to Sumba in 1949. However, until three decades later, no ornithologist was involved in bird research on Sumba.

It was only in 1979, Joh MacKinnon resumed bird surveys on Sumba, with the results in a list of species that had been systematically documented.

== See also ==
- Geography of Indonesia
