= Rawa Aopa Watumohai National Park =

National park in Sulawesi, Indonesia

- IUCN category II (national park)
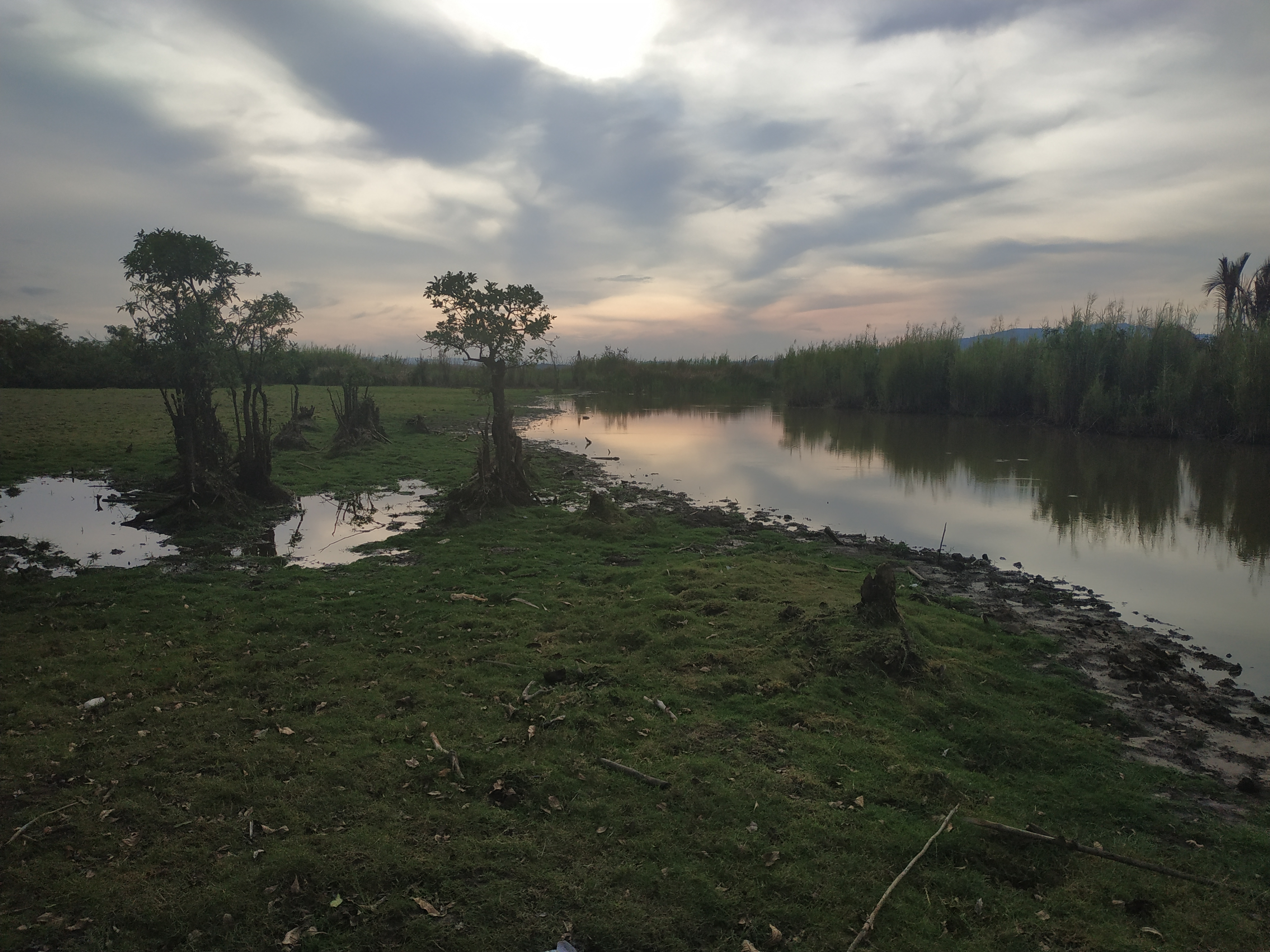

- Location within Sulawesi
- Location: Sulawesi, Indonesia
- Coordinates: 4°26′S 121°53′E
- Area: 1,050 km^{2} (410 sq mi)
- Established: 1989

Ramsar Wetland
- Designated: 6 March 2011
- Reference no.: 1944

Rawa Aopa Watumohai National Park is a national park on the Indonesian island of Sulawesi, in the province of South East Sulawesi. It was declared in 1989 and has an area of 1,050 km². The park ranges from sea level to an altitude of 981 m. It contains the Aopa peat swamp, the largest in Sulawesi, and is recognised as a wetland of international importance.

== Flora and fauna ==
The park has varied vegetation: sub-montane rain forests, mangrove forests, coastal forests, savanna, and freshwater swamp forests. In the park, 323 plant species have been recorded, including Borassus flabellifer, Bruguiera gymnorhiza, Callicarpa celebica, Cratoxylum formosum and Metrosideros petiolata.

It is home to Babirusa, both species of endangered Anoa – miniature water buffaloes – and 155 bird species, of which 37 are endemic to Sulawesi. Birds in the park include the maleo, lesser adjutant, Asian woolly-necked stork, collared kingfisher, Yellow-crested cockatoo, vinous-breasted sparrowhawk, Sulawesi black pigeon and Nicobar pigeon. The park also provides habitat to a population of 170 endangered milky storks. Primates in the park include the spectral tarsier and the vulnerable booted macaque.

The park also protects 11 reptile and 20 fish species and is an important nursery area for crabs, fish, and prawns.

== Human habitation ==
The area of the park has been traditionally inhabited by the Moronene people. During the Dutch colonial era, there were 7 villages within the area of the current national park. In the 1950s many Moronene villagers moved to other parts of the island, but since the 1970s there has been a back-migration. However, local authorities doubted that those returning were of Moronene ancestry and would have rights to the land. Consequently, after the national park has been declared, there have been several attempts by local authorities to evict people living in the park. In 1997 security forces burned down 175 houses, and the following year another 88 houses. In a third intervention in 2001, another 100 houses were destroyed.

== Conservation and threats ==
The national park was declared in 1989, and in 2011 it was designated as a Ramsar wetland of international importance.

Threats to the park include illegal logging, poaching, and collection of eggs.

== See also ==
- List of national parks of Indonesia
- Geography of Indonesia
