= Rattus hainaldi =

Conservation status
- Endangered (IUCN 3.1)

Scientific classification
- Kingdom: Animalia
- Phylum: Chordata
- Class: Mammalia
- Order: Rodentia
- Family: Muridae
- Genus: Rattus
- Species: R. hainaldi

Binomial name
- Rattus hainaldi Kitchener, How & Maharadatunkamsi, 1991

Species of rodent

Rattus hainaldi is a species of rodent in the family Muridae. It is found only on Flores Island in Indonesia, including on Mount Ranaka. Part of its habitat is protected within the Kelimutu National Park. It is a small sized-species, with a body mass of around 40–100 grams (1.4–3.5 oz), and is thought to be terrestrial and a nest builder that prefers closed, forested, montane habitats.
