= Bogani Nani Wartabone National Park =

National park on Sulawesi island, Indonesia

- Taman Nasional Bogani Nani Wartabone
- IUCN category II (national park)
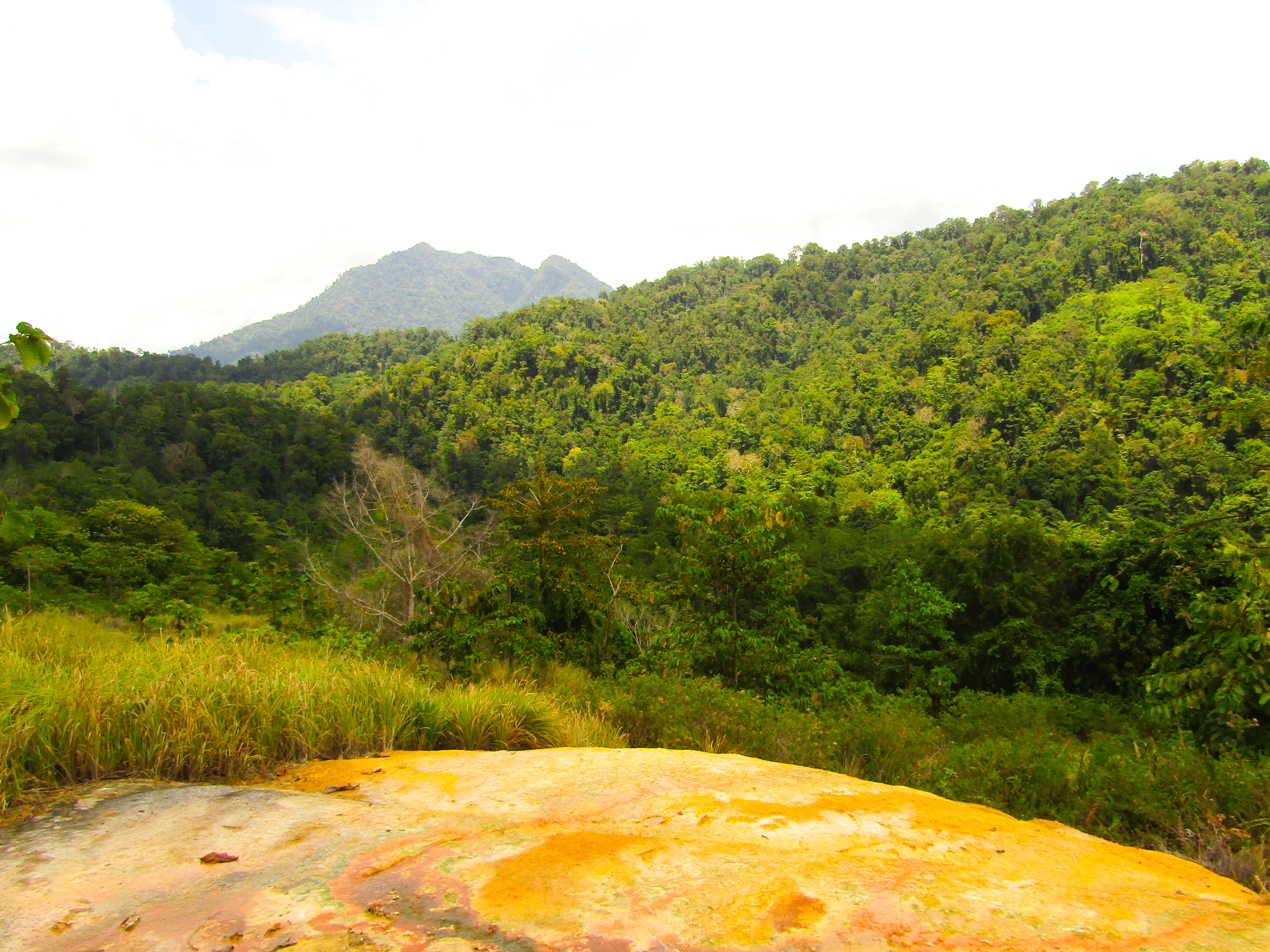
- Hungayono forest is one of the forest areas included in the Bogani Nani Wartabone National Park, Gorontalo.

- Location within Sulawesi
- Location: Sulawesi, Indonesia
- Coordinates: 0°33′38″N 123°40′48″E
- Area: 2,871.15 square kilometres (287,115 ha)
- Established: 1991
- Governing body: Ministry of Environment and Forestry
- Website: boganinaniwartabone.org

Bogani Nani Wartabone National Park is a 2,871 km^{2} (1,108 mi^{2}) national park on Minahassa Peninsula on Sulawesi island, Indonesia. Formerly known as Dumoga Bone National Park, it was established in 1991 and was renamed in honour of Nani Wartabone, a local resistance fighter who drove the Japanese from Gorontalo during World War II. The park has been identified by Wildlife Conservation Society as the single most important site for the conservation of Sulawesi wildlife and is home to many species endemic to Sulawesi.

== Flora and fauna ==
Common plant species in the park are Piper aduncum, Trema orientalis, Macaranga species and various orchids. Endangered plants in the park include the matayangan palm (Pholidocarpus ihur), Makassar Ebony, iron wood (Intsia spp.), yellow wood (Arcangelisia flava), and carrion flower (Amorphophallus companulatus).

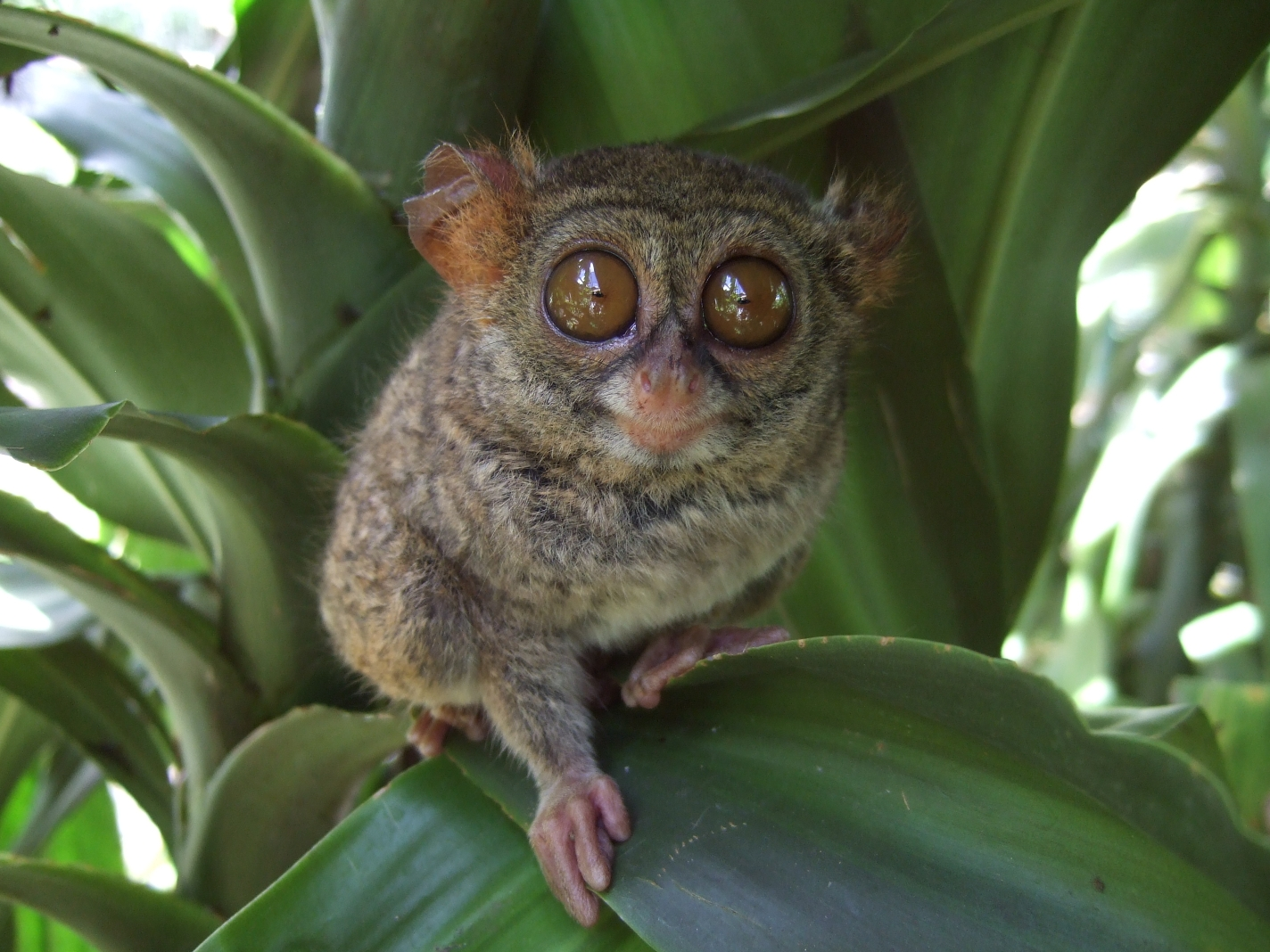
The spectral tarsier is one of the endangered species inhabiting the park

In the park there have been recorded 24 mammal, 11 reptile and 125 bird species. These include the endangered anoa and cinnabar hawk owl, which was only described scientifically in 1999 from a specimen collected from the park.

Among the larger animals of the park are babirusas and the Sulawesi warty pig.

=== Maleo breeding ===
The maleo megapode is endemic to the island and is the park's mascot. Maleo birds have been bred successfully in this park, and as per February 2012, about 3,300 birds have been released to their habitat. Hungoyono camp in Bone Bolango is the largest maleo habitat which the conservationists have 4 breeding sites. Normally the birds need geothermal hot sand for their breeding as in Hungoyono camp.

== Threats ==
The park is threatened by uncontrolled logging, poaching and illegal gold mining.

== See also ==
- Geography of Indonesia
