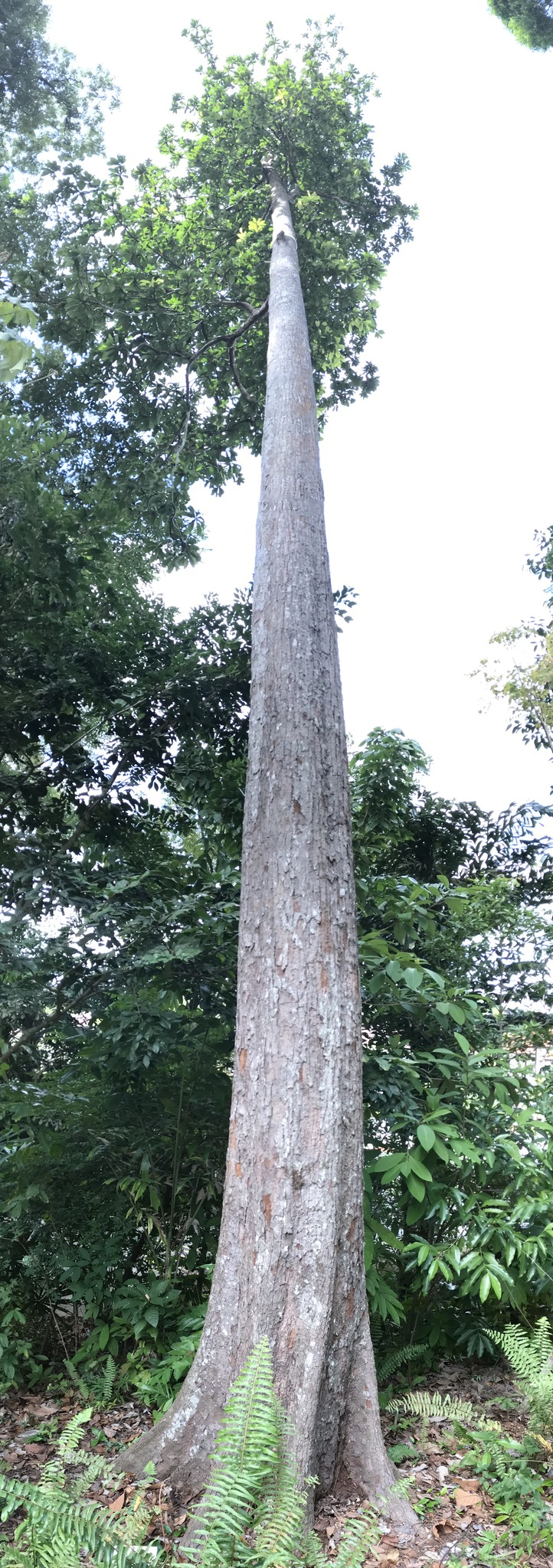
- In Singapore

Conservation status
- Least Concern (IUCN 3.1)

Scientific classification
- Kingdom: Plantae
- Clade: Tracheophytes
- Clade: Angiosperms
- Clade: Eudicots
- Clade: Asterids
- Order: Ericales
- Family: Sapotaceae
- Genus: Palaquium
- Species: P. obovatum

Binomial name
- Palaquium obovatum (Griff.) Engl.

Synonyms
- Dichopsis obovata (Griff.) C.B.Clarke; Isonandra obovata Griff.

= Palaquium obovatum =

Species of tree

Palaquium obovatum is a tree in the family Sapotaceae. The specific epithet obovatum means 'egg-shaped', referring to the leaves.

== Description ==
Palaquium obovatum grows up to 40 metres (130 ft) tall. The bark is red brown. Inflorescences bear up to 10 flowers. The fruits are round, up to 30 mm (1 in) in diameter. The latex has been used as a low-quality gutta-percha.

== Distribution and habitat ==
Palaquium obovatum is native to India, Indo-China and Malesia. Its habitat is in limestone and other types of lowland tropical forest.
