= Geography of Indonesia =

- Continent: Asia
- Region: Southeast Asia
- Coordinates: 5.000°S 120.000°E
- Area: Ranked 14th
  - Total: 1,904,569 km^{2} (735,358 sq mi)
  - Land: 23.62%
  - Water: 76.38%
- Coastline: 54,720 km (34,000 mi)
- Borders: Malaysia: 2,019 km (1,255 mi); Papua New Guinea: 824 km (512 mi); East Timor: 253 km (157 mi)
- Highest point: Puncak Jaya (Carstensz Pyramid); 4,884 m (16,024 ft)
- Lowest point: Sea level 0 m (0 ft)
- Longest river: Kapuas River; 1,143 km (710 mi)
- Largest lake: Lake Toba; 1,130 km^{2} (436 sq mi)
- Climate: Mostly tropical rainforest (Af), Southeastern part is predominantly tropical savanna (Aw), while some parts of Java and Sulawesi are tropical monsoon (Am)
- Terrain: Plain in most part of Kalimantan, southern New Guinea, eastern Sumatra and northern Java; Rugged, volcanic topography in Sulawesi, western Sumatra, southern Java, Lesser Sunda Islands and Maluku Islands; Rugged mountains in central, northwestern New Guinea and northern Kalimantan
- Natural resources: Arable land, coal, petroleum, natural gas, timber, copper, lead, phosphates, uranium, bauxite, gold, iron, mercury, nickel, silver
- Natural hazards: Tsunamis; volcanoes; earthquake activity except in central part; tropical cyclones along the Indian coasts; mud slides in Java; flooding
- Environmental issues: Severe deforestation, air pollution resulting in acid rain, river pollution
- Exclusive economic zone: 6,159,032 km^{2} (2,378,016 mi^{2})

Indonesia is an archipelagic country located in Southeast Asia, lying between the Indian Ocean and the Pacific Ocean. It is located in a strategic location astride or along major sea lanes connecting East Asia, South Asia and Oceania. Indonesia is the largest archipelago in the world. Indonesia's various regional cultures have been shaped—although not specifically determined—by centuries of complex interactions with its physical environment.

== Overview ==
Indonesia is an archipelagic country extending about 5,120 kilometres (3,181 mi) from east to west and 1,760 kilometres (1,094 mi) from north to south. It is considered to be the largest archipelagic country in the world. According to a geospatial survey conducted between 2007 and 2010 by National Coordinating Agency for Survey and Mapping (Bakosurtanal), Indonesia has 17,500 islands, while an earlier survey conducted in 2002 by National Institute of Aeronautics and Space (LAPAN) stated Indonesia has 18,307 islands. According to the CIA World Factbook, there are 17,508 islands. The discrepancy between the surveys is likely caused by the earlier different survey method including tidal islands, sandy cays and rocky reefs that surface during low tide and submerge during high tide. There are 8,844 named islands according to estimates made by the government of Indonesia, with 922 of those being permanent. Indonesia comprises five main islands: Sumatra, Java, Borneo (known as Kalimantan in Indonesia), Sulawesi, and New Guinea; two major island groups (Nusa Tenggara and the Maluku Islands) and sixty smaller island groups. Four of the islands are shared with other countries: Borneo is shared with Malaysia and Brunei; Sebatik, located off the northeastern coast of Kalimantan, is shared with Malaysia; Timor is shared with East Timor; and New Guinea is shared with Papua New Guinea.

Indonesia has total land area of 1,904,569 square kilometres (735,358 sq mi), including 93,000 square kilometres (35,908 sq mi) of inland seas (straits, bays, and other bodies of water). This makes it the largest island country in the world. The additional surrounding sea areas bring Indonesia's generally recognised territory (land and sea) to about 5 million km^{2}. The government claims an exclusive economic zone of 6,159,032 km^{2} (2,378,016 mi^{2}). This brings the total area to about 7.9 million km^{2}.

During the Pleistocene, the Greater Sunda Islands were connected to the Asian mainland while New Guinea was connected to Australia. Karimata Strait, Java Sea and Arafura Sea were formed as the sea level rose at the end of the Pleistocene.

== Geology ==
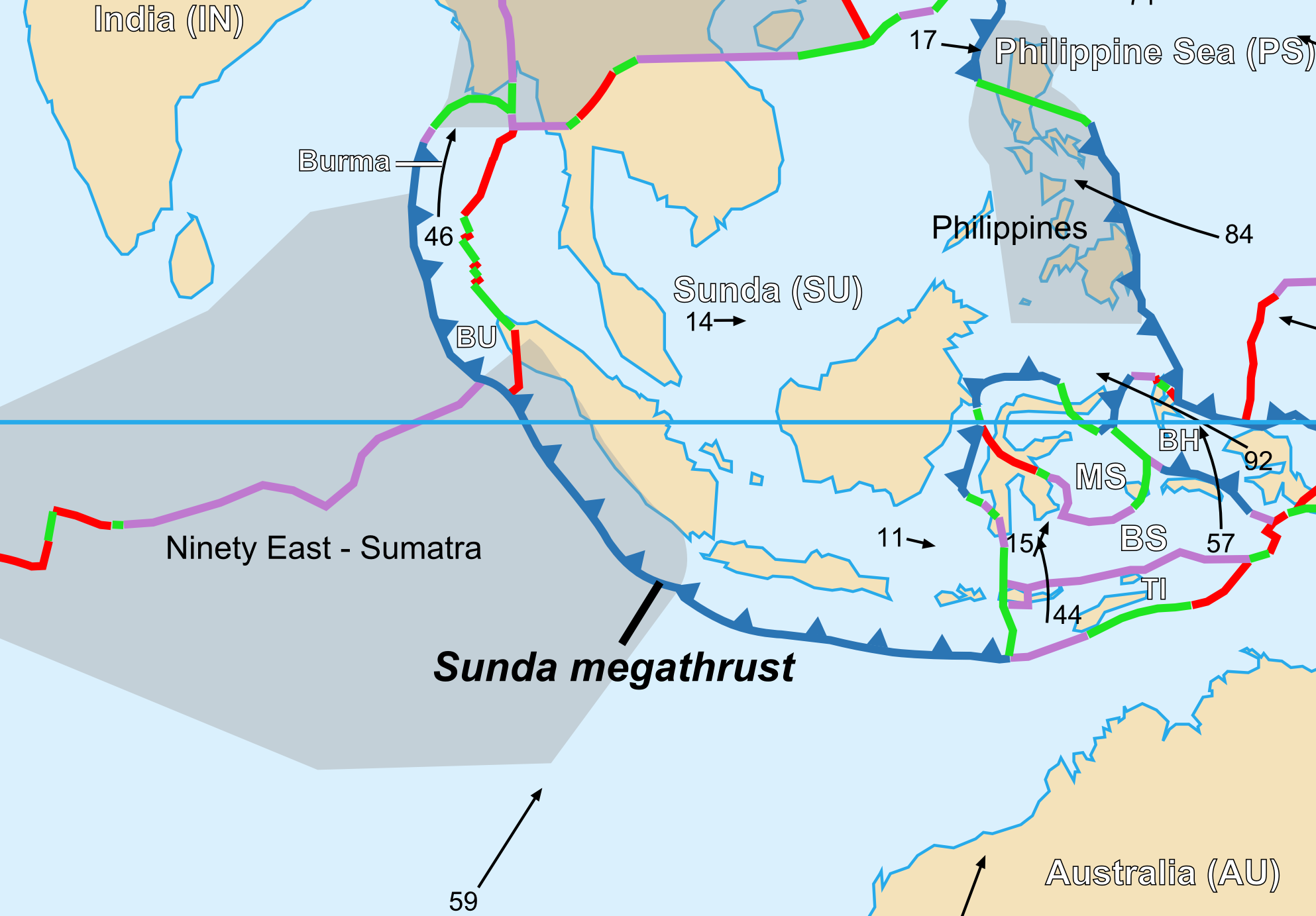
The tectonic plates and movements under Indonesia

The main islands of Sumatra, Java, Madura, and Kalimantan lie on the Sunda plate and geographers have conventionally grouped them, (along with Sulawesi), as the Greater Sunda Islands. At Indonesia's eastern extremity is western New Guinea, which lies on the Australian plate. Sea depths in the Sunda and Sahul shelves average 300 metres (984 ft) or less. Between these two shelves lie Sulawesi, Nusa Tenggara (also known as the Lesser Sunda Islands), and the Maluku Islands (or the Moluccas), which form a second island group with deep, surrounding seas down to 4,500 metres (14,764 ft) in depth. The term "Outer Islands" is used inconsistently by various writers, but it is usually taken to mean those islands other than Java and Madura.

Sulawesi is an island that lies on three separate plates, the Banda Sea plate, Molucca Sea plate, and Sunda plate. Seismic and volcanic activities are high on its northeastern part, evidenced by the formation of volcanoes in North Sulawesi and island arcs such as the Sangihe and Talaud Islands, southwest of the Philippine Trench.

Nusa Tenggara consists of two strings of islands stretching eastward from Bali toward southern Maluku. The inner arc of Nusa Tenggara is a continuation of the Alpide belt chain of mountains and volcanoes extending from Sumatra through Java, Bali, and Flores, and trailing off in the volcanic Banda Islands, which along with the Kai Islands and the Tanimbar Islands and other small islands in the Banda Sea are typical examples of the Wallacea mixture of Asian and Australasian plant and animal life. The outer arc of Nusa Tenggara is a geological extension of the chain of islands west of Sumatra that includes Nias, Mentawai, and Enggano. This chain resurfaces in Nusa Tenggara in the ruggedly mountainous islands of Sumba and Timor.

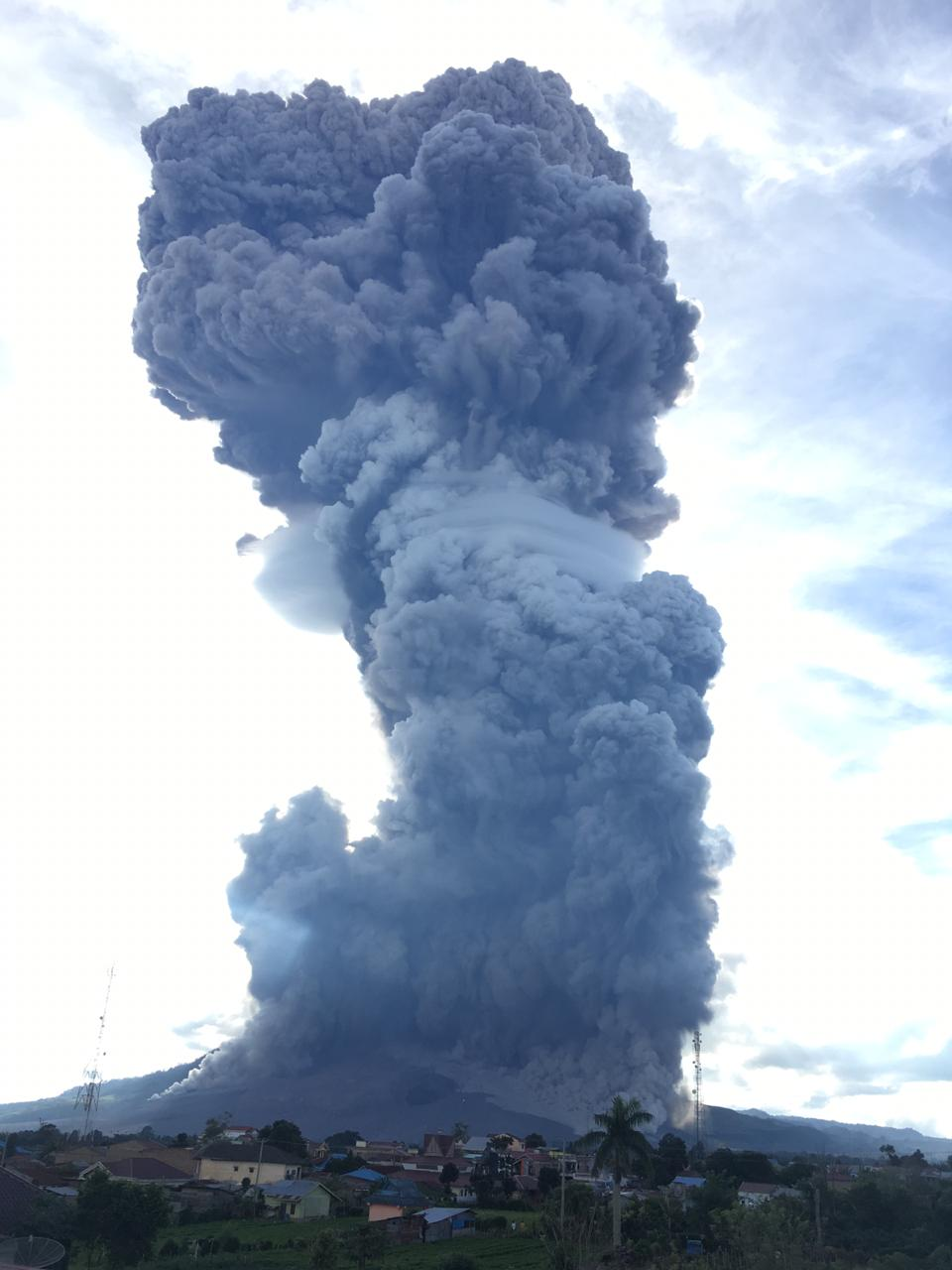
2019 eruption of Sinabung in North Sumatra. Sinabung is one of the most active volcanoes in Indonesia.

The Maluku Islands (or Moluccas) are geologically among the most complex of the Indonesian islands, consisted of four different tectonic plates. They are located in the northeast sector of the archipelago, bounded by the Philippine Sea to the north, Papua to the east, and Nusa Tenggara to the southwest. The largest of these islands include Halmahera, Seram and Buru, all of which rise steeply out of very deep seas and have unique Wallacea vegetation. This abrupt relief pattern from sea to high mountains means that there are very few level coastal plains. To the south lies the Banda Sea. The convergence between the Banda Sea plate and Australian plate created a chain of volcanic islands called the Banda Arc. The sea also contains the Weber Deep, one of the deepest point in Indonesia.

Geomorphologists believe that the island of New Guinea is part of the Australian continent, both lies on Sahul Shelf and once joined via a land bridge during the Last glacial period. The tectonic movement of the Australian plate created towering, snowcapped mountain peaks lining the island's central east–west spine and hot, humid alluvial plains along the coasts. The New Guinea Highlands range some 650 kilometres (404 mi) east to west along the island, forming a mountainous spine between the northern and southern portion of the island. Due to its tectonic movement, New Guinea experienced many earthquakes and tsunamis, especially in its northern and western part.

=== Tectonism and volcanism ===
Most of the larger islands are mountainous, with peaks ranging between 2,000 and 3,800 metres (6,562 and 12,467 ft) meters above sea level in Sumatra, Java, Bali, Lombok, Sulawesi, and Seram. The country's tallest mountains are located in the Jayawijaya Mountains and the Sudirman Range in Papua. The highest peak, Puncak Jaya (4,884 metres (16,024 ft)), is located in the Sudirman Mountains. A string of volcanoes stretches from Sumatra to Nusa Tenggara, then loops around through to the Banda Islands of Maluku to northeastern Sulawesi. Of the 400 volcanoes, approximately 150 are active. Two of the most violent volcanic eruptions in modern times occurred in Indonesia; in 1815, Mount Tambora in Sumbawa erupted, killing 92,000, and in 1883, Krakatau erupted, killing 36,000. While volcanic ashes resulted from eruption has positive effects for the fertility of the surrounding soils, it also makes agricultural conditions unpredictable in some areas.

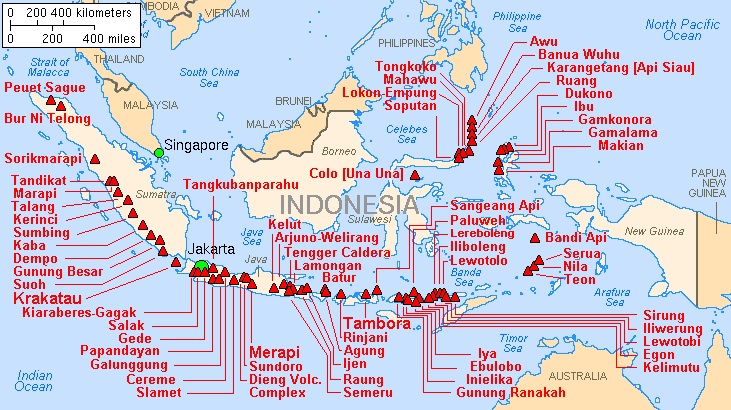
A map of Indonesia's volcanoes

Indonesia has relatively high tectonic and volcanic activities. It lies on the convergence between the Eurasian, Indo-Australian, Pacific, and Philippine Sea plate. The Sunda megathrust is a 5,500 km long fault located off southern coasts of Sumatra, Java and Lesser Sunda Islands, where the Indo-Australian Plate is thrusting northeastward towards the subducting Sunda Plate. Tectonic movement in this fault is responsible for the creation of the Sunda Trench, and mountain ranges across Sumatra, Java, and the Lesser Sunda Islands. Many great earthquakes occurred in the vicinity of the fault, such as the 2004 Indian Ocean earthquake. Mount Merapi, located in the Java portion of the megathrust, is the most active volcano in Indonesia and is designated as one of world's Decade Volcanoes due to the hazard it poses to the surrounding populated areas. The 2004 Indian Ocean earthquake and tsunami devastated the Indonesian provinces of Aceh and North Sumatra, resulting in approximately 225,000 deaths and leaving over 425,000 people homeless. The disaster caused significant damage to infrastructure, homes, and local industries. The Indonesian government, in partnership with international organisations like the IMF, World Bank, and ADB, coordinated relief and reconstruction efforts. Preliminary assessments estimated the reconstruction cost at $4-5 billion over five years. During a donor meeting in January 2005, nearly $4 billion in aid was pledged for reconstruction, with a focus on transparency and efficient fund management. Despite the severe local impact, the overall effect on Indonesia’s national GDP was limited, as the Aceh region contributed only about 2% of national output. The Paris Club also offered a temporary debt moratorium, which helped fund rebuilding without diverting domestic financial resources.

The northern part of Sulawesi and Maluku Islands lie on the convergence of Sunda Plate and Molucca Sea plate, making it an active tectonic region with volcanic chains such as the Sangihe and Talaud Islands. Northern Maluku and western New Guinea is located on the convergence of Bird's Head, Philippine Sea and Caroline plate. It is also a seismically active region, with the 7.6 M_{w} 2009 Papua earthquakes being the most recent great earthquake to date in the region.

== Ecology ==
Borneo is the third largest island in the world, and the native vegetation was mostly Borneo lowland rain forests, although much of this has been cleared with wildlife retreating to the Borneo montane rain forests inland. The islands of North Maluku are the original Spice Islands, a distinct rainforest ecoregion. A number of islands off the coast of New Guinea have their own distinctive biogeographic features, including the limestone islands of Biak, in the entrance to the large Cenderawasih Bay at the northwest end of the island.

A recent global remote sensing analysis suggested that there were 14,416 km^{2} of tidal flats in Indonesia, ranking it 1st in the world in terms of how much tidal flat occurs there. Another global analysis also estimated that Indonesia experienced the greatest total tidal wetland change (36% of global net change including mangroves, tidal flats, and tidal marshes) between 1999 and 2019 with a net loss of 1,426 km^{2} (551 mi^{2}).

== Time zones ==
Indonesia is divided into three time zones:

- Western Indonesian Time/WIT (Indonesian: Waktu Indonesia Barat/WIB) (UTC+7)
  - WIB is observed in islands of Sumatra, Java, provinces of West Kalimantan and Central Kalimantan.
- Central Indonesian Time/CIT (Waktu Indonesia Tengah/WITA) (UTC+8)
  - WITA is observed in islands of Sulawesi, Lesser Sunda Islands, provinces of East Kalimantan, South Kalimantan, and North Kalimantan.
- Eastern Indonesian Time/EIT (Waktu Indonesia Timur/WIT) (UTC+9).
  - WIT is observed in provinces of Maluku, North Maluku, Papua, West Papua, Southwest Papua, Central Papua, South Papua, and Highland Papua.

== Climate ==
Köppen–Geiger climate classification map for Indonesia

Lying along the equator, Indonesia's climate tends to be relatively even year-round. Indonesia has two seasons—a wet season and a dry season—with no extremes of summer or winter. For most of Indonesia, the dry season falls between May and October while the wet season between November and April.

Some regions, such as Kalimantan and Sumatra, experience only slight differences in rainfall and temperature between the seasons, whereas others, such as Nusa Tenggara, experience far more pronounced differences with droughts in the dry season, and floods in the wet. Rainfall in Indonesia is plentiful, particularly in west Sumatra, northwest Kalimantan, west Java, and western New Guinea.

Parts of Sulawesi and some islands closer to Australia, such as Sumba and Timor, are drier; however, these are exceptions. The almost uniformly warm waters that make up 81% of Indonesia's area ensure that temperatures on land remain fairly constant, with the coastal plains averaging 28 °C (82.4 °F), the inland and mountain areas averaging 26 °C (78.8 °F), and the higher mountain regions averaging 23 °C (73.4 °F). The area's relative humidity ranges between 70 and 90%.

Winds are moderate and generally predictable, with monsoons usually blowing in from the south and east in June through October and from the northwest in November through March. Typhoons and large scale storms pose little hazard to mariners in Indonesia waters; the major danger comes from swift currents in channels, such as the Lombok and Sape straits.

Indonesia's climate is almost entirely tropical, dominated by the tropical rainforest climate found in every major island of Indonesia, followed by the tropical monsoon climate that predominantly lies along Java's coastal north, Sulawesi's coastal south and east, and Bali, and finally the tropical savanna climate, found in isolated locations of Central Java, lowland East Java, coastal southern Papua and smaller islands to the east of Lombok.

However, cooler climate types do exist in mountainous regions of Indonesia 1,300–1,500 metres above sea level. The oceanic climate (Köppen Cfb) prevail in highland areas with fairly uniform precipitation year-round, adjacent to rainforest climates, while the subtropical highland climate (Köppen Cwb) exist in highland areas with a more pronounced dry season, adjacent to tropical monsoon and savanna climates.

Above 3000 metres is where cold, subpolar climates dominate and where frost and occasional snow become more commonplace. The subpolar oceanic climate (Köppen Cfc), existing between 3,000 and 3,500 metres, can be found on the mountain slopes of Indonesia's highest peaks, and serves as a transition between oceanic climates and tundra climates. Tundra climates (Köppen ET), are found anywhere above 3500 metres on the highest peaks of Indonesia, including the permanently snow-capped peaks in Papua. In this climate regime, average monthly temperatures are all below 10 °C, and monthly precipitation is uniform.

== Environmental issues ==
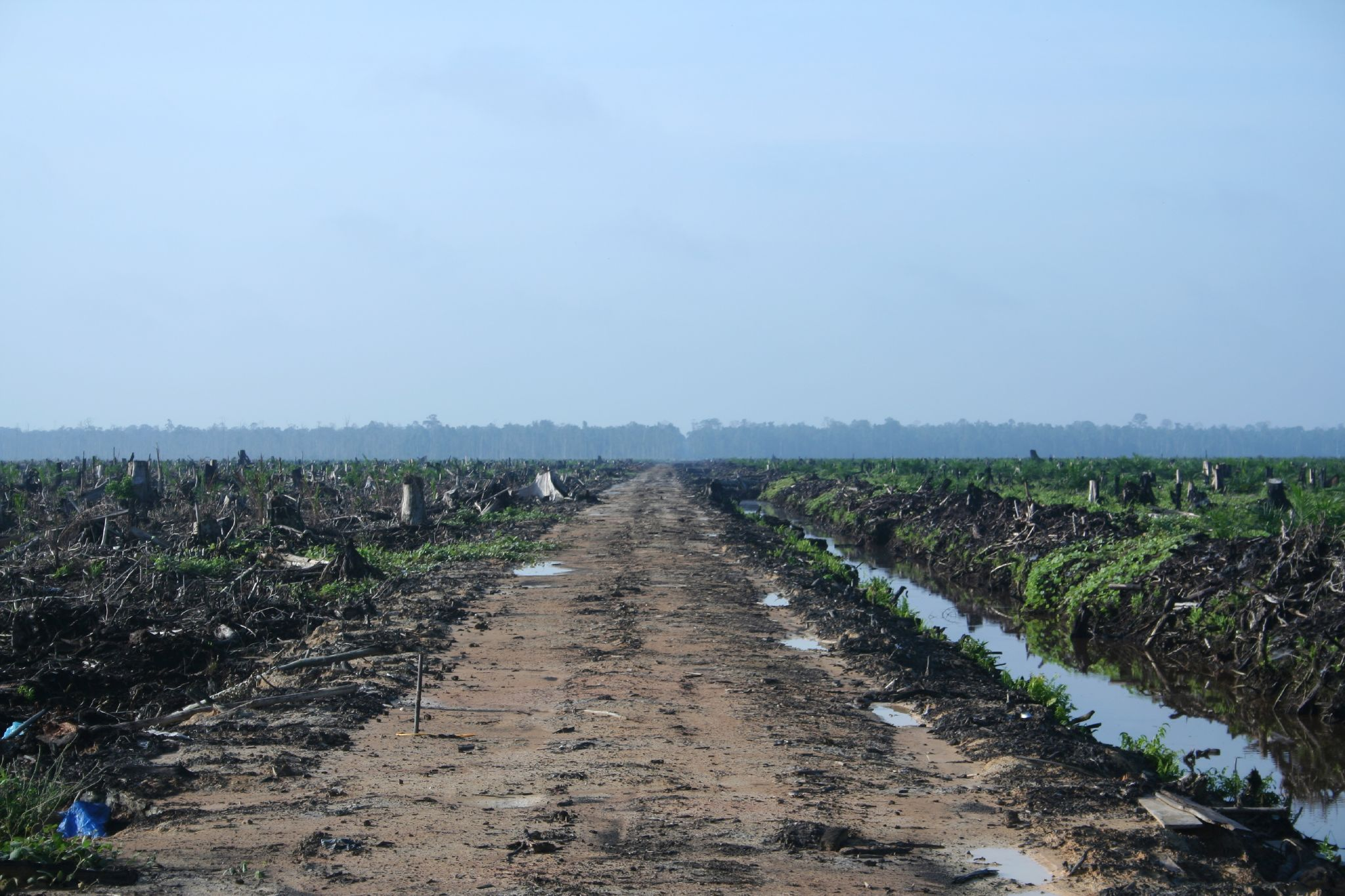
Deforestation in Riau province, Sumatra, to make way for an oil palm plantation, 2007.

Indonesia's high population and rapid industrialisation present serious environmental issues, which are often given a lower priority due to high poverty levels and weak, under-resourced governance. Issues include large-scale deforestation (much of it illegal) and related wildfires causing heavy smog over parts of western Indonesia, Malaysia and Singapore; over-exploitation of marine resources; and environmental problems associated with rapid urbanisation and economic development, including air pollution, traffic congestion, garbage management, and reliable water and waste water services.

Deforestation and the destruction of peatlands make Indonesia the world's third largest emitter of greenhouse gases. Habitat destruction threatens the survival of indigenous and endemic species, including 140 species of mammals identified by the World Conservation Union (IUCN) as threatened, and 15 identified as critically endangered, including the Sumatran Orangutan.

In 1978, 14% of Indonesians lived in cities compared to over 30% today, and this increases pressure on the urban environment. Industrial pollution is increasing, particularly in Java, and the increasing affluence of the growing middle class drives a rapid increase in the number of motor vehicles and associated emissions. Garbage and waste water services are being placed under increasing pressure. Reliance on septic systems or effluent disposal in open canals and river systems remains the norm, and is a major polluter of water resources. Very few Indonesians have access to safe drinking water and must boil water before use.

The geographical resources of the Indonesian archipelago have been exploited in ways that fall into consistent social and historical patterns. One cultural pattern consists of the formerly Indianised, rice-growing peasants in the valleys and plains of Sumatra, Java, and Bali, another cultural complex is composed of the largely Islamic coastal commercial sector, a third, more marginal sector consists of the upland forest farming communities which exist by means of subsistence swidden agriculture. To some degree, these patterns can be linked to the geographical resources themselves, with abundant shoreline, generally calm seas, and steady winds favouring the use of sailing vessels, and fertile valleys and plains—at least in the Greater Sunda Islands—permitting irrigated rice farming. The heavily forested, mountainous interior hinders overland communication by road or river, but fosters slash-and-burn agriculture.

== Statistics ==
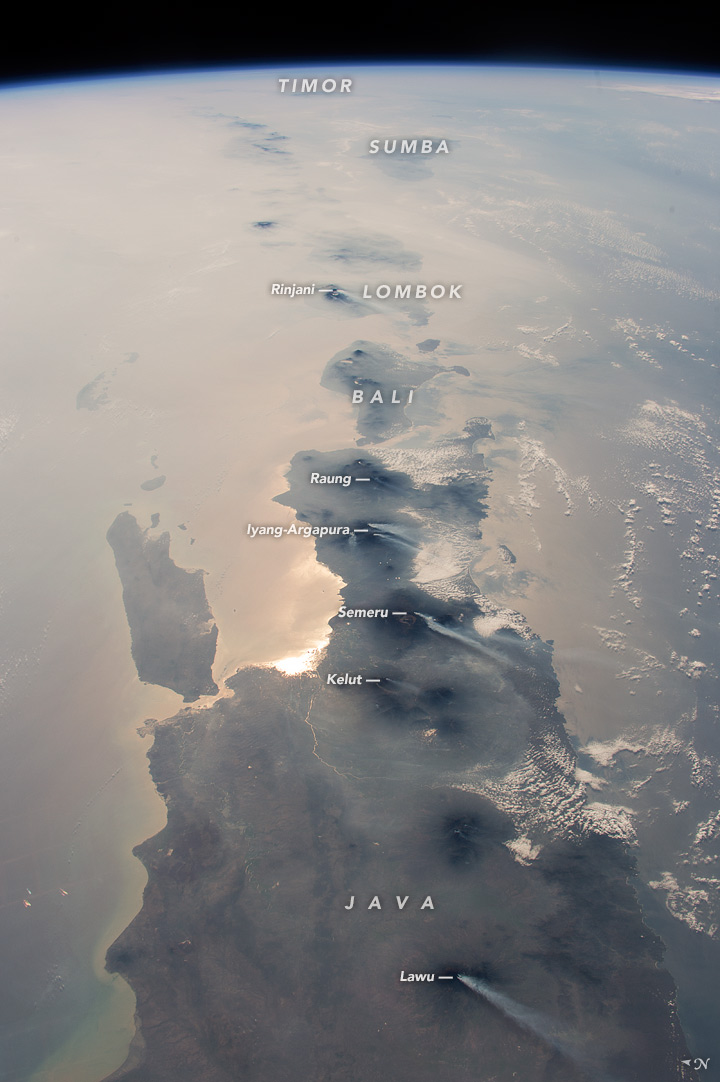
Java and eastern Indonesia photographed in 2015 by an astronaut on the International Space Station. Six active volcanos are visible. Haze is from wildfires.

Area:
total land area: 1,904,569 km^{2} (land: 1,811,569 km^{2 (699450 mi^{2})}, inland water: 93,000 km^{2} (36,000 sq mi)

Area – comparative:

- Slightly smaller than Nunavut, Canada
- Slightly larger than combined area of Alaska and New England
- More than 27 times larger than Republic of Ireland
- Territorial area: 5,193,250 km^{2}
- Total area (including exclusive economic zone): 8,063,601 km^{2}

Land boundaries:

- Total: 3,096 kilometres (1,924 mi)
- Border countries: Malaysia 2,019 kilometres (1,255 mi), Papua New Guinea 824 kilometres (512 mi), East Timor 253 kilometres (157 mi)
- Other nearby countries: Australia, Brunei, Cambodia, India, Laos, Myanmar, Palau, Philippines, Singapore, Sri Lanka, Thailand, Vietnam

Coastline: 54,720 km (34,000 mi)

Maritime claims: measured from claimed archipelagic baselines
territorial sea: 12 nmi (13.8 mi; 22.2 km)
exclusive economic zone: 6,159,032 km^{2} (2,378,016 mi^{2}) with 200 nmi (230.2 mi; 370.4 km)

Elevation extremes:
lowest point: Sea level at 0 m (sea surface level); southern portion of the Philippine Trench, east of Miangas at −9,125 metres (−29,938 ft)
highest point: Puncak Jaya (also known as Carstensz Pyramid) 4,884 m

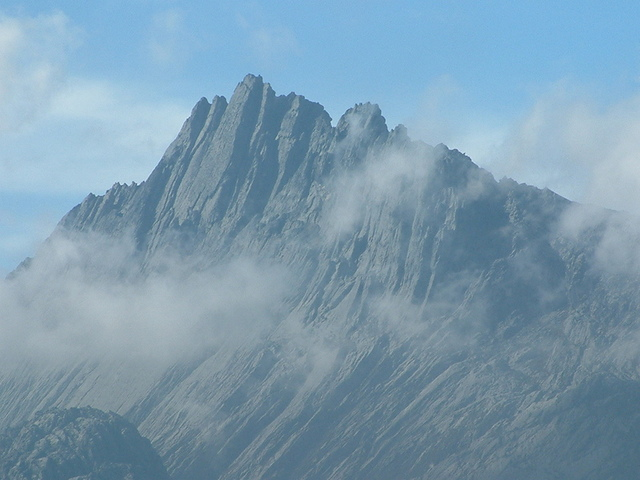
Puncak Jaya, the highest mountain in Indonesia

Land use:
arable land: 12.97%
permanent crops: 12.14%
other: 74.88% (2013)

Irrigated land: 67,220 km^{2} (2005) (25,953 mi^{2})

Total renewable water resources: 2,019 km^{3} (2011) (484 mi^{3})

Freshwater withdrawal (domestic/industrial/agricultural):
total: 113.3 km^{3}/yr (11%/19%/71%)
per capita: 517.3 m^{3}/yr (2005)

Natural resources: coal, petroleum, natural gas, tin, nickel, timber, bauxite, copper, fertile soils, gold, silver

== See also ==
- List of Indonesian provinces by highest point
