= Tropical Rainforest Heritage of Sumatra =

UNESCO World Heritage Site
- Sumatran orangutan in Gunung Leuser National Park

- Location within Indonesia
- Location: Sumatra, Indonesia
- Includes: 1. Gunung Leuser National Park; 2. Kerinci Seblat National Park; 3. Bukit Barisan Selatan National Park
- Criteria: Natural: (vii), (ix), (x)
- Reference: 1167
- Inscription: 2004 (28th Session)
- Endangered: 2011–...
- Area: 2,595,124 ha (6,412,690 acres)
- Coordinates: 02°30′S 101°30′E

Tropical Rainforest Heritage of Sumatra sites

The Tropical Rainforest Heritage of Sumatra site was inscribed as a UNESCO World Heritage Site in 2004. It comprises three Indonesian national parks on the island of Sumatra: Gunung Leuser National Park, Kerinci Seblat National Park and the Bukit Barisan Selatan National Park. The site is listed under Criteria vii - outstanding scenic beauty; ix- an outstanding example representing significant on-going ecological and biological processes; and x- contains the most important and significant natural habitats for in-situ conservation. The Tropical Rainforest Heritage of Sumatra has been placed on the Danger List since 2011 to help overcome threats posed by poaching, illegal logging, agricultural encroachment, and plans to build roads through the site.

== Location and size ==
The Tropical Rainforest Heritage of Sumatra consists of three national parks: Gunung Leuser National Park (GLNP) (8629.75 km^{2}), Kerinci Seblat National Park (KSNP) (13,753.5 km^{2}) and Bukit Barisan Selatan National Park (BBSNP) (3568 km^{2}). The total area of the rainforest is 25,000 km^{2}. The Tropical Rainforest Heritage of Sumatra was chosen because, first, it represents significant area of forests on the island of Sumatra, because of the biodiversity of lowland and mountain forest. This once vast island of tropical rainforest has been condensed to secluded areas in the space of 50 years.

Second, the national parks that make up the heritage are all located on the key spine of the Bukit Barisan Mountains, known as the 'Andes of Sumatra'. The mountains of each site represent important mountainous backdrops to the established and developed lowlands of Sumatra. The mixture of Lake Gunung Tujuh (the highest lake in Southeast Asia), the Mount Kerinci volcano, many small volcanic, coastal and glacial lakes in natural forested settings shows the scale of the Tropical Rainforest Heritage of Sumatra.

Lastly, all three national parks have a very varied habitat and have outstanding biodiversity. Altogether the three sites make up 50% of the total plant variety, in Sumatra. At least 92 local common species have been recognized in GLNP. The nomination contains populations of both the world's largest flower (Rafflesia arnoldi) and the tallest flower (Amorphophallus titanum). The Tropical Rainforest of Sumatra became part of the World Heritage List in 2004. 2.5 million hectares of Sumatra's rainforests were included on the World Heritage List of the UN Educational, Scientific and Cultural Organization (UNESCO) because of their rich and different biodiversity.

== Geography and climate ==
Gunung Leuser National Park in the north of the island is 150 km long, over 100 km wide and is mostly mountainous. 40% of the park is steep, and over 1,500 m. 12% of the park only, in the lower southern half, is below 600 meters but for 25 km runs down the coast. Eleven peaks are over 2,700 m and the highest point is Gunung Leuser reaching 3,466 metres. The area surrounding Gunung Leuser is known as the Leuser Ecosystem.

Kerinci Seblat National Park in the centre extends 350 km down the back of the Bukit Barisan, averaging 45 km width and 2000 m above sea level. The northern half has a lower eastern mountain range, between 800 and 1500 m. Three quarters of the park is steep. The highest point, and highest volcano in Indonesia, is the Mount Kerinci, standing at 3,805 m.

Bukit Barisan Selatan National Park is also 350 km long but only 45 km wide on average. The northern two-thirds are rocky, averaging 1,500 m with the highest point, Mount Pulung standing at 1,964 m. The southern half is lower; 90 km of it is a cape and the park borders the sea for half its length. Many of rivers derive in the parks and there are several lakes and hot springs.

The mountains have year-round little changing high temperatures, high humidity and high rainfall for 9 months in wetter areas, 7 months in drier areas. This climate has encouraged the high speciation (formation of new species) and variety of species. Gunung Leuser, receives 3000 mm of rainfall, in the north, and collects 4657 mm in the lowland south. Temperatures average between 21 °C to 28 °C and the humidity is always above 60%, especially when over 1700 m. In Kerinci Seblat, the rainfall averages 2990 mm, temperatures range from 16° to 28 °C and humidity is always high (77-90%). In Bukit Barisan Selatan, the rocky west is wet especially during the November to May monsoon: rainfall is 3000–4000 mm. The east is drier, with 2500–3000 mm of rainfall and the temperature ranging between 20°and 28 °C.

== Flora and fauna ==
GLNP is a part of the 18 Indonesian regions classified by the World Wide Fund for Nature (WWF) among the 200 global ecoregions of importance for preservation of the world's biodiversity. 174 mammals, 3 being endemic and 21 listed as threatened in 2000. Little is known about the smaller mammals. 380 species of birds are listed, 13 being endemic and 52 threatened. Some of the important species: the orangutan, Sumatran rhinoceros, and the pigtailed monkey. Important plants are: Rafflesia arnoldi, and Amorphophallus titanum. Several important bird species: Rueck's blue-flycatcher, and white-winged wood duck.

In KSNP, 85 mammal species are recorded, 5 endemic and 23 listed threatened 370 species of birds are listed, 13 being endemic and 58 threatened. Some important mammal species: Bornean clouded leopard, Asian tapir, and Sumatran rhino. The population of Sumatran tigers in the Kerinci Seblat National Park is the highest recorded, making it one of the 12 Globally Important Tiger Conservation Landscapes. Several important bird species: white-winged wood duck and Sumatran ground-cuckoo. A few of important plant species: Hopea beccariana and Shorea ovalis ssp. seicea.

BBSNP, has 98 mammals are recorded, with 1 endemic and 25 threatened 379 species of birds are listed, 7 being endemic and 58. 59 reptile and amphibian species are recorded. BBSNP has the same bird species as KSNP. Some important mammal species: Sumatran elephant.
