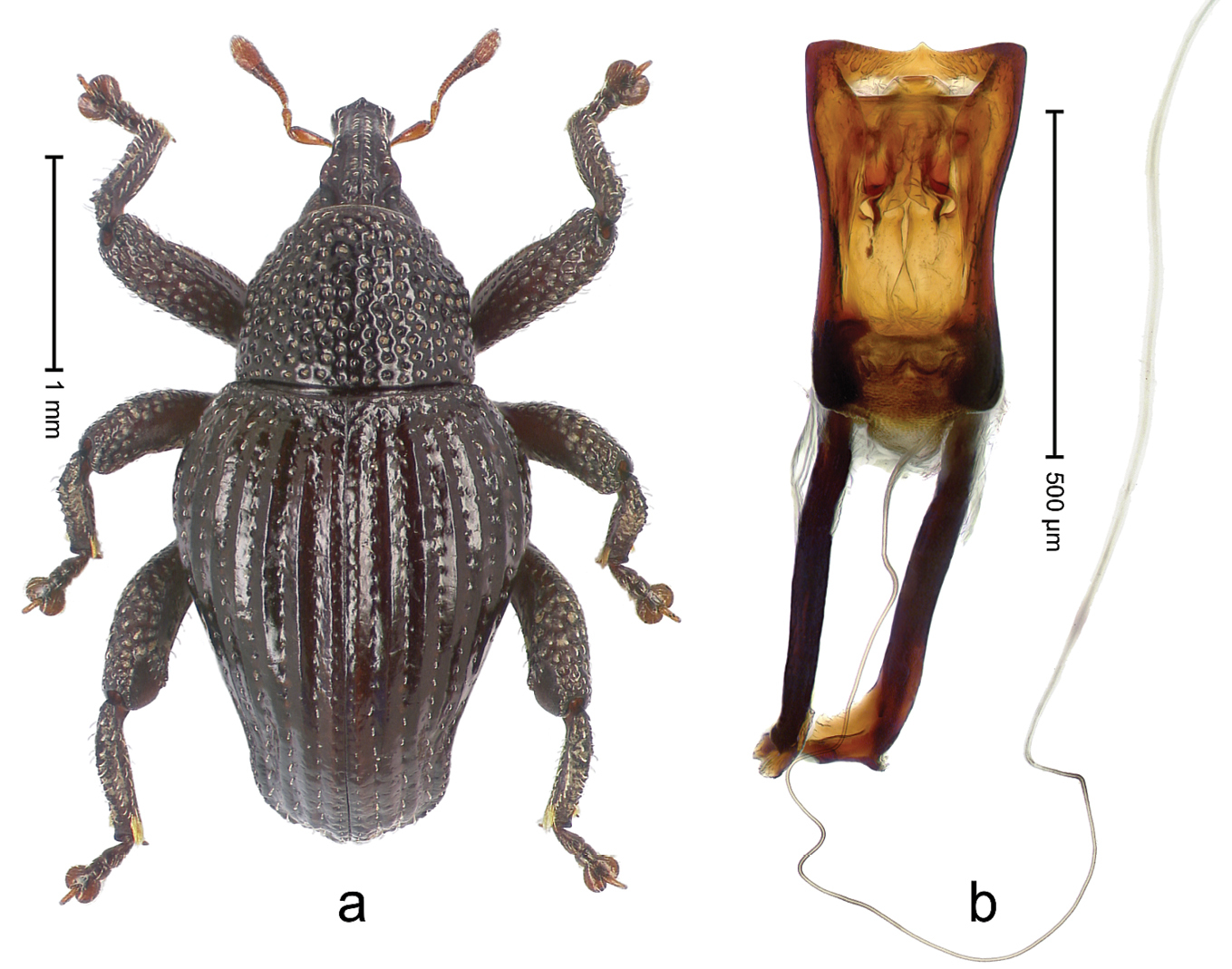

Scientific classification
- Kingdom: Animalia
- Phylum: Arthropoda
- Clade: Pancrustacea
- Class: Insecta
- Order: Coleoptera
- Suborder: Polyphaga
- Infraorder: Cucujiformia
- Family: Curculionidae
- Genus: Trigonopterus
- Species: T. amphoralis

Binomial name
- Trigonopterus amphoralis Marshall (1925)

= Trigonopterus amphoralis =

Species of beetle

Trigonopterus amphoralis is a species of flightless weevil in the genus Trigonopterus from Indonesia. It is endemic to Lampung, Sumatra, where it is found in Bukit Barisan Selatan National Park and around Pedada Bay. It is 2.53–3.02 mm, with a black body and reddish-brown legs and antennae.

== Description ==
The beetle is 2.53–3.02 mm long. It has reddish-brown legs and antennae, with the rest of the body being black. The body is elongated, with a pronounced narrowing between the pronotum and elytron when viewed from above, but no constriction in profile. The rostrum has a median carina that ends abruptly at the forehead, along with a pair of submedian ridges. The grooves between these ridges are punctured, each puncture bearing an erect piliform scale. The epistome has a transverse, angled ridge that forms a central denticle.

The pronotum lacks a distinct narrowing near the tip. Its surface is densely punctured, with smooth spaces between punctures; each puncture contains a small scale. The elytra have deeply impressed striae, each with a row of partly worn scales—suberect in the basal half and small, recumbent near the tip. The intervals are weakly ridged and bare, with interval 7 swollen near the tip and slightly projecting outward. The apex of the elytra is extended downward, forming a beak-like shape. The meso- and metafemurs have a crenulate ridge on the underside. The metafemur also has a stridulatory patch near the tip and a transverse row of small teeth. The upper edge of the metatibia is toothed. Abdominal ventrite 5 is flat at the base and has a shallow depression in the apical half.

The penis is strongly curved downward in profile, with sides that are nearly parallel at the base and diverge toward the tip. The apex has a small central denticle. The apodemes are 1.8 times the length of the penis body. The ductus ejaculatorius lacks a bulbus.

The elytra may be reddish-brown in some individuals. In females, the rostrum has pairs of lateral and submedian grooves, which continue toward the tip as coarse punctures. The epistome is simple. The elytral apex is rounded in males and narrower and angled in females. Abdominal ventrite 5 is flat.

== Distribution ==
Trigonopterus amphoralis is endemic to Lampung, Sumatra, where it is found in Bukit Barisan Selatan National Park and around Pedada Bay. It has been recorded from elevations of 371–813 m (1,217–2,667 ft).
