= Kappi =

Kappi may refer to:

- Kappi Plateau, or Twin Mountains, in Aceh, Indonesia
- Pekko Käppi (born 1976), Finnish musician
- Kepi (Alemannic German: Käppi), a cap with a flat circular top and a peak

== See also ==
- Keppi, a species of fish in Cameroon
- Kaapi, Indian filter coffee
