= David Chivers =

British primate biologist (1944–2026)

David J. Chivers
- Born: David John Chivers; 2 April 1944; Bicester, Oxfordshire, England
- Died: 5 March 2026 (aged 81)
- Education: Sidney Sussex College, University of Cambridge
- Known for: Research on gibbons and primate socio-ecology
- Awards: President, Primate Society of Great Britain (1982–1986)
- Scientific career
- Fields: Primatology
- Workplaces: University of Cambridge

David John Chivers (2 April 1944 – 5 March 2026) was a British primate biologist who was professor emeritus in Primate Biology and Conservation, and Director of Studies in Veterinary Medicine and also Biological Anthropology, Selwyn College, University of Cambridge. He was also a President of the Primate Society of Great Britain. Chivers was noted for his research in the socio-ecology and conservation of primates and other wildlife in South East Asia, Southern Asia and Brazil.

== Early life and education ==
Chivers was born in Bicester, Oxfordshire, England in 1944. He attended Merchant Taylors' School, Northwood, before studying at Sidney Sussex College, University of Cambridge. He graduated in 1966 with degrees in Medical Sciences (Veterinary) and Physical Anthropology. Rather than pursuing clinical veterinary training, he began doctoral research in Physical Anthropology, focusing on primate behaviour. His PhD, awarded in 1972, was based on a two-year field study of the siamang in Peninsular Malaysia, following earlier research on Howler monkeys in Panama.

== Career ==
Chivers joined the University of Cambridge in 1970 as a Demonstrator in Veterinary Anatomy and became a lecturer in 1975. He taught anatomy to veterinary students and primate biology in Physical Anthropology, supervising numerous research projects in Southeast Asia. His work emphasized primate ecology, nutrition, and conservation, including long-term studies in Malaysia and collaborative programs with local universities.

His research formed part of the expansion of field primatology in the late twentieth century, when scientists increasingly studied primates in their natural habitats rather than primarily in laboratory settings.

Chivers edited books including Malayan Forest Primates (1980) and co-authored volumes on primate feeding and behaviour, which were favourably reviewed.

He served as President of the Primate Society of Great Britain and organized international primatology congresses. His research combined anatomical studies with field ecology, contributing to understanding primate diets and rainforest conservation.

=== Siamangs ===
Chivers frequented Malaysia from 1968 to 1972 while undertaking his PhD studying siamangs, from which he published The Siamang in Malaya. A Field Study of a Primate in Tropical Rain Forest.

=== Gibbons ===
Chivers developed a special interest in Gibbons following his first encounters in Malaysia in 1968. In 1985 he moved to Borneo to develop Project Barito Ulu in Central Kalimantan with the Indonesian Ministry of Forestry, to investigate the role of fruit-eating animals in seed dispersal in the natural regeneration of forests, living there until 2012. Out of 50 doctoral studies he supervised, 12 were on gibbons.

He was a noted expert of gibbon behaviour, including their raucous dawn singing, which he described as a “beautiful symphony”.

=== Orangutans ===
From 1999 to 2014 he focused on orangutans, supervising at least seven doctoral theses examining orangutan rehabilitation and reintroduction.

=== Conservation and advocacy ===
Throughout his career and after his retirement from Cambridge in 2013, Chivers remained a vocal advocate for primate habitat conservation. In 2009 he was a panellist at the Great Ape Debate held at the Linnean Society where conservationists discussed a growing controversy surrounding measures to save the orangutan.

Chivers emphasised “the critical issue of needing to understand ourselves” is central to mitigating negative human impacts, and believed biologist Jeremy Griffith’s explanation of the human condition offers “the necessary breakthrough.”

== Death ==
Chivers died on 5 March 2026, at the age of 81.

== Leadership positions ==
- President, Primate Society of Great Britain 1982-6
- President and trustee of the Borneo Nature Trust
- Patron of Twycross Zoo
- Head, Wildlife Research Group, University of Cambridge
- Tutor and Praelector and Gardens Steward, University of Cambridge
- Council Member, Fauna and Flora Preservation Society (FFPS) (now Fauna and Flora International (FFI))

== Selected publications ==
=== Selected books ===
- Recent Advances in Primatology: Vol.2. David J. Chivers and William Lane-Petter (eds). 1978. Academic Press Inc. ISBN 978-0-121-73302-5.
- Malayan Forest Primates: Ten Years’ Study in Tropical Rain Forest. 1980. ISBN 978-1-4757-0878-3
- Food Acquisition and Processing in Primates. 1982. David J. Chivers, Bernard A. Wood & Alan Bilsborough. Springer. ISBN 978-1-475-75246-5.
- Gorillas and chimpanzees (First sight). David Chivers. 1987. ISBN 978-1-573-35536-0.
- Hands of Primates. 1993. Holger Preuschoft & David J. Chivers (Eds). Springer. ISBN 978-3-709-17434-0.

=== Selected articles and chapters ===
- The siamang in Malaya: A field study of a primate in tropical rainforest. Basel: Karger; 1974.
- Chivers, David J. "Communication Within and Between Family Groups of Siamang (Symphalangus Syndactylus)", Behaviour 57, 1-2 (1976): 116–135.
- Chivers DJ. "Sexual behaviour of wild siamang". Chivers DJ, Herbert J, editors. Recent advances in primatology. London: Academic Press; 1978. pp. 609–610.
- The primates of peninsular Malaysia. 1979
- Chivers DJ, Hladik CM. "Morphology of the gastrointestinal tract in primates: comparisons with other mammals in relation to diet." Journal of Morphology. 1980;166:337–386. doi: 10.1002/jmor.1051660306.
- Chivers, D. J. (2001). "The swinging singing apes: Fighting for food and family in Far-East forests." The apes: Challenges for the 21st century (pp. 1–28). Brookfield, IL: Chicago Zoological Society.
- Chivers, David J. "Gibbons: the small apes." World atlas of great apes and their conservation. Berkeley: University of California Press. p (2005): 205–214. ISBN 0-520-24633-0.
- Harrison ME, Morrogh-Bernard HC, Chivers DJ. "Orangutan energetics and the influence of fruit availability in the nonmasting peat-swamp forest of Sabangau, Indonesian Borneo". International Journaly of Primatology. 2010;31:585–607
- Chivers, David J. and McConkey, Kim R. "Introduction: From Diets to Disturbance: The Evolution of Primate Feeding Studies". How Primates Eat: A Synthesis of Nutritional Ecology across a Mammal Order, edited by Joanna E. Lambert, Margaret A. H. Bryer and Jessica M. Rothman, Chicago: University of Chicago Press, 2024, pp. 1–18.
- Nobi, Mohammad Nur & Sarker, A.H.M. & Nath, Biswajit & Kvinta, Paul & Suza, Ma & Chivers, David & Misbahuzzaman, Khaled & Røskaft, Eivin & Hossain, Mohammad. (2025). "Evaluating the economic value of Sundarban, Bangladesh’s provisioning services with a special focus on the forest dependency of the local peoples." Journal of Forest Research. 1–11. 10.1080/13416979.2025.2564572.

=== Documentary films ===
- Gibbons: The Forgotten Apes In Peril. 2009. 48min. Presenter. Directed by Elliot Haimoff.
