= Gunung Leuser National Park =

National park in Sumatra, Indonesia

- Taman Nasional Gunung Leuser
- IUCN category II (national park)
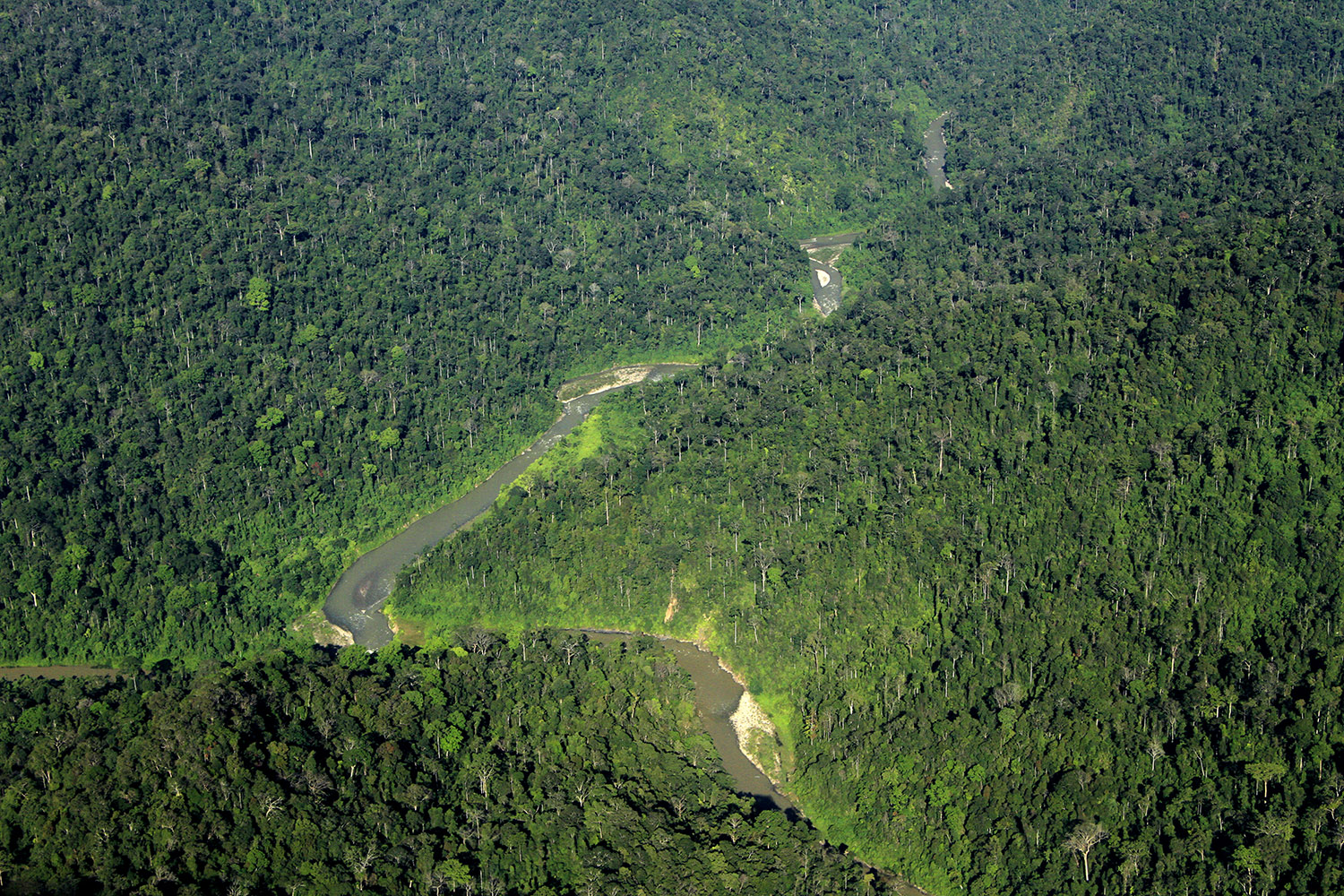

- Location within Sumatra Location within Indonesia
- Location: Sumatra, Indonesia
- Coordinates: 3°30′N 97°30′E
- Area: 792,700 acres (3,208 km^{2})
- Established: 1980
- Governing body: Ministry of Environment and Forestry
- World Heritage site: 2004
- Website: gunungleuser.or.id

UNESCO World Heritage Site
- Type: Natural
- Criteria: vii, ix, x
- Designated: 2004 (28th session)
- Part of: Tropical Rainforest Heritage of Sumatra
- Reference no.: 1167
- Region: Asia-Pacific
- Endangered: 2011–present

Gunung Leuser National Park is a national park covering 7,927 km^{2} in northern Sumatra, Indonesia, straddling the border of Aceh and North Sumatra provinces, a fourth portion and three-fourths portion, respectively. The national park, settled in the Barisan mountain range, is named after Mount Leuser (3,119 m), and protects a wide range of ecosystems. An orangutan sanctuary at Bukit Lawang is located within the park. Together with Bukit Barisan Selatan and Kerinci Seblat National Parks, it forms a World Heritage Site, the Tropical Rainforest Heritage of Sumatra.

== Geography ==
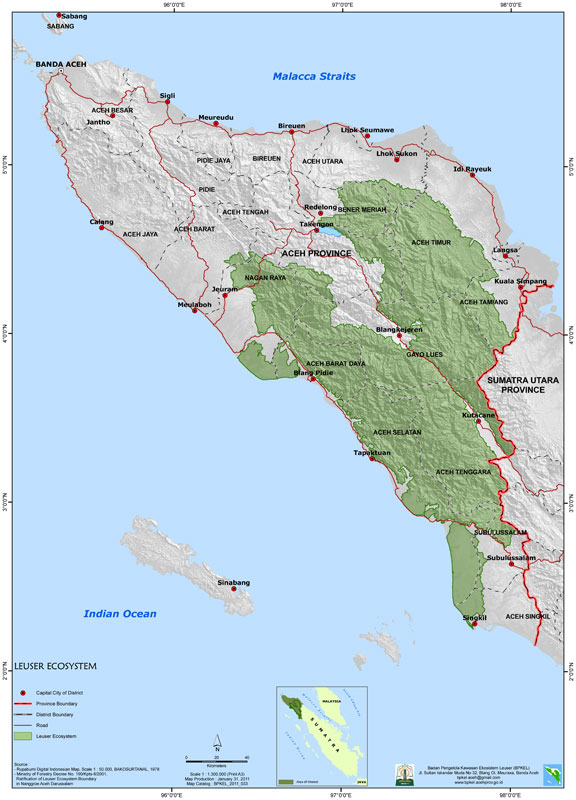
Gunung Leuser Ecosystem -bigger than the NP, located in 2 provinces, Aceh (represented here) and North Sumatra (not represented).

Gunung Leuser National Park is 150 km long, over 100 km wide, and mostly mountainous. About 40% of the park, mainly in the north-west, is steep, and over 1,500 m in elevation. This region is billed as the largest wilderness area in Southeast Asia, and offers wonderful trekking. Around 12% of the park, in the lower southern half, is less than 600 m above sea level. Eleven peaks are over 2,700 m. Mount Leuser (3,119 m) is the third-highest peak of the Leuser Range. The highest peak is Mount Tanpa Nama (3,466 m), the second-highest peak in Sumatra after Mount Kerinci (3,805 m).

== Ecology ==
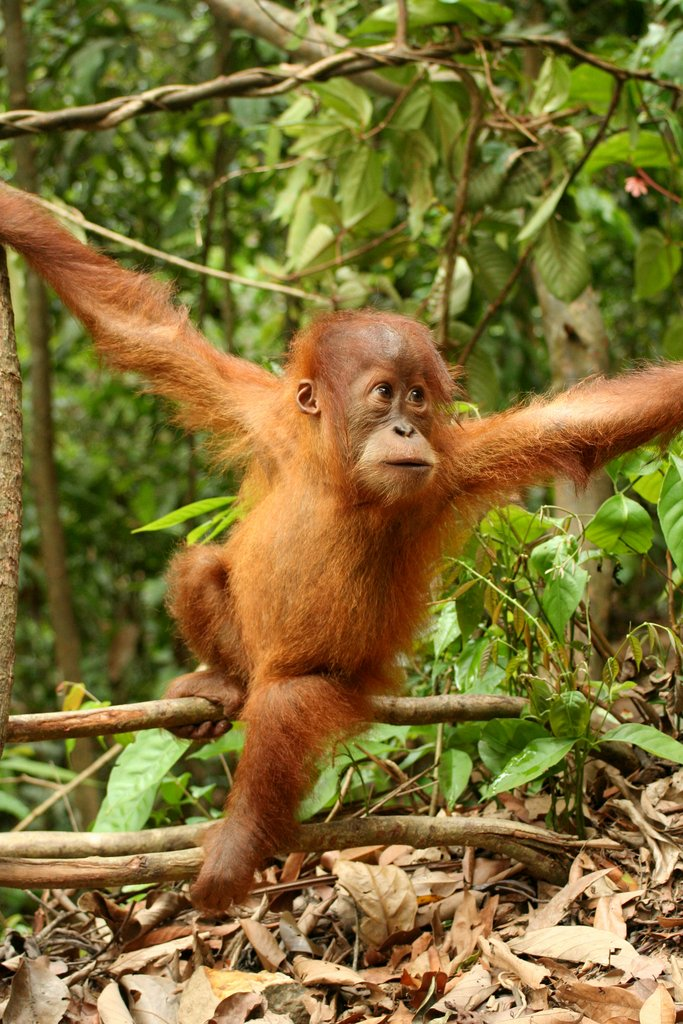
Young orangutan in the national park

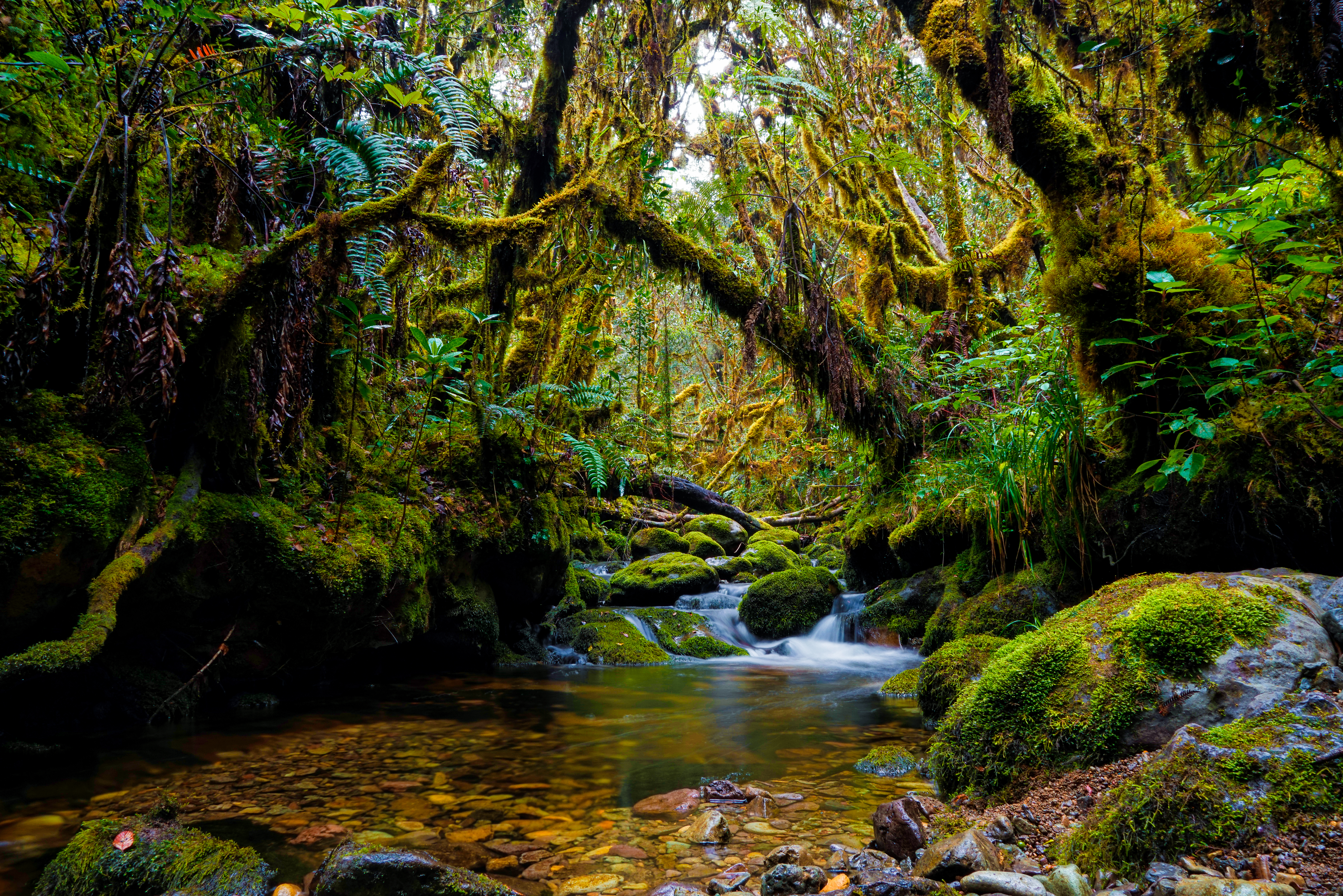
Mount Leuser Forest

Gunung Leuser National Park is one of the two remaining habitats for Sumatran orangutans (Pongo abelii). In 1971, Herman Rijksen established the Ketambe Research Station, a specially designated research area for the orangutan. Other mammals found in the park are the Sumatran elephant, Sumatran tiger, Sumatran rhinoceros, siamang, Sumatran serow, sambar deer and leopard cat.

After researchers put 28 camera traps in July 2011, 6 months later the researchers found one male and six females, and predicted the population is not more than 27 Sumatran rhinos, of which the total population is predicted to be around 200 in Sumatra and Malaysia, half the population of 15 years ago.

=== Water supply ===
The first signs of reduced water replenishment have already been seen in and around the Leuser Ecosystem. Groundwater reservoirs are rapidly being exhausted, and several rivers fall completely dry during part of the year. This has severe consequences for the local community. Both households and industries need to anticipate water shortages and higher costs for water.

=== Fishery ===
Coastal fisheries and aquaculture in and around Leuser are very important. They provide a large portion of the animal protein in local people's diets and generate ample foreign exchange. Their annual value currently exceeds US $171 million. If the Leuser Ecosystem is degraded, the decline in fresh water may have a detrimental impact on the functioning of the fishery sector.

=== Flood and drought prevention ===
Flooding generally becomes more frequent and more destructive as a result of converting forests to other uses. Annual storm flows from a secondary forest are about threefold higher than from a similarly sized primary forest catchment area.

In Aceh, local farmers have reported an increasing frequency of drought and damaging floods due to degradation of the watercatchment area. In May 1998, over 5,000 hectares of intensive rice growing areas were taken out of active production. This was the result of the failure of 29 irrigation schemes due to a water shortage. Floods in December 2000 cost the lives of at least 190 people and left 660,000 people homeless. This cost the Aceh province almost US $90 million in losses. Logging companies are reportedly slowly recognising their role in increased flooding.

=== Agriculture and plantations ===
Agriculture is a major source of income for the local communities around Leuser. Large rubber and oil palm plantations in northern Sumatra play a major role in the national economy.

Almost all remaining lowland forest area has been given out officially for oil palm plantations. Yield decline has been recorded, however, in several Leuser regencies. This decline can be ascribed mainly to a deterioration of nutrients in the soil, along with soil erosion, drought and floods, and an increase in weeds.

=== Hydroelectricity ===
Several regencies, such as Aceh Tenggara, have hydroelectric plants that use water from Leuser. The plants operated in Aceh Tenggara are designed as small-scale economic activities. It appears that the operational conditions for the hydroelectric plants have worsened in recent years. Increased erosion of the waterways has forced the operators to remove excessive sediments from their turbines. This has led to frequent interruption of the power supply, higher operational costs, and damage to the blades of the turbines. One plant closed down due to lack of water supply. Most of these disturbances are considered abnormal and may, therefore, be attributed to deforestation.

=== Tourism ===
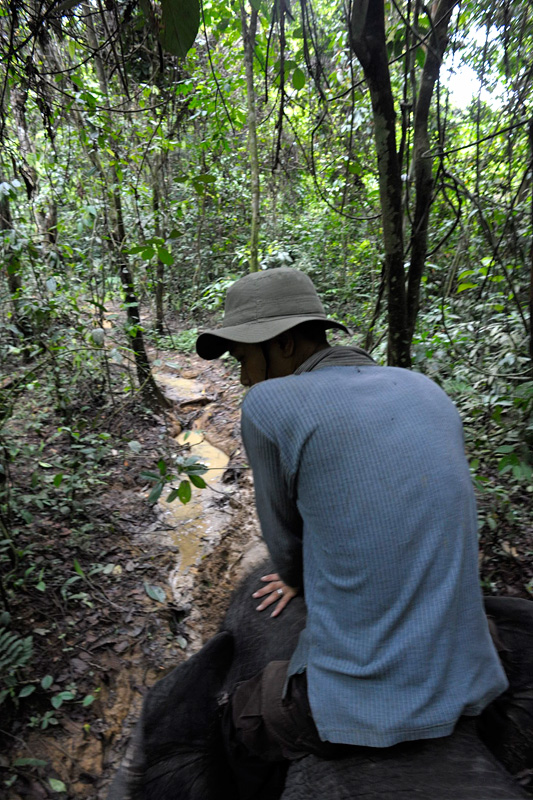
Elephant jungle patrol near Tangkahan

Low-impact ecotourism can be one of the most important sustainable, nonconsumptive uses of Leuser, thereby giving local communities powerful incentives for conservation. Given the opportunities to view wildlife such as orangutans, some experts view ecotourism as a major potential source of revenue for communities living around Leuser.

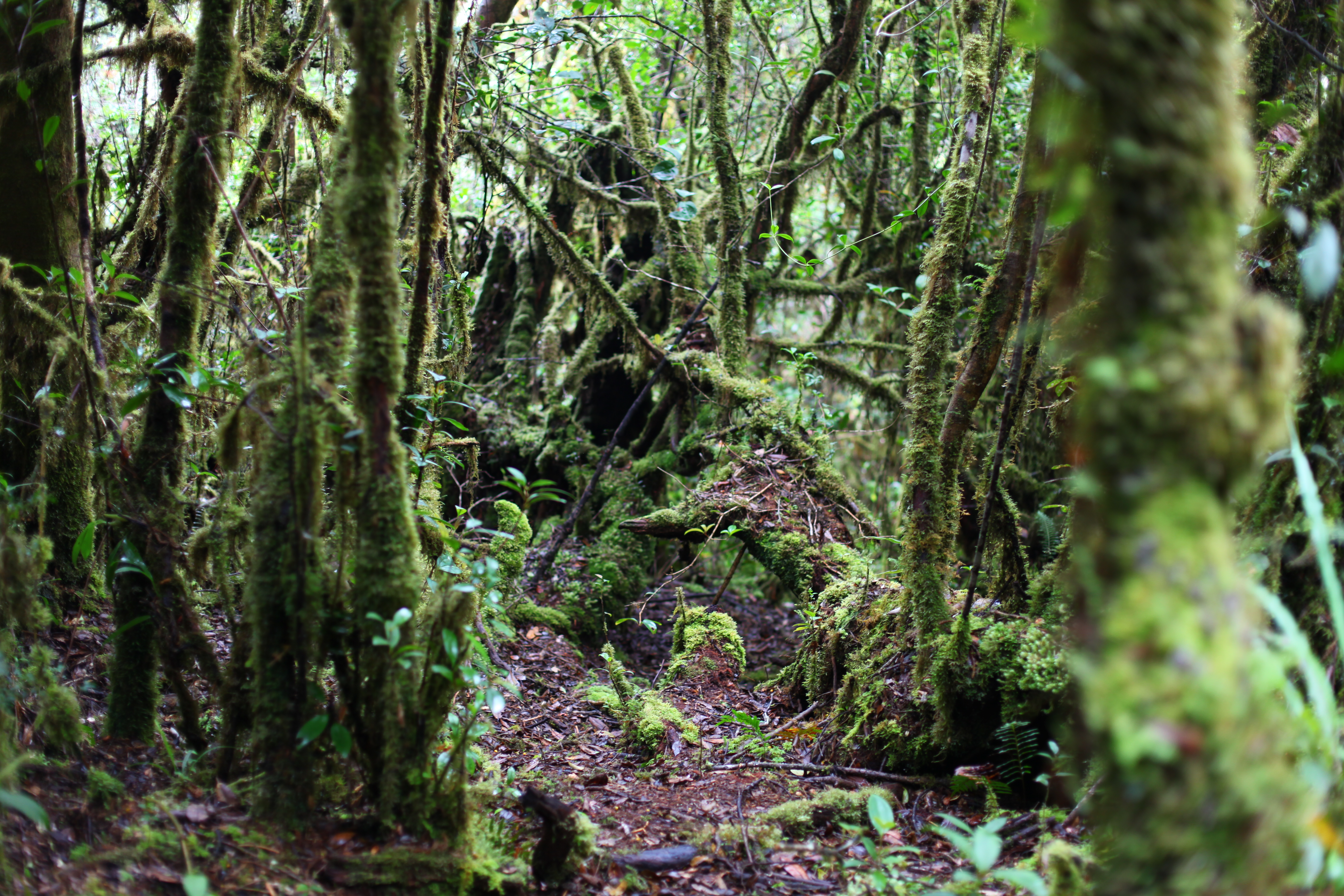
Path to the summit of Mount Kemiri

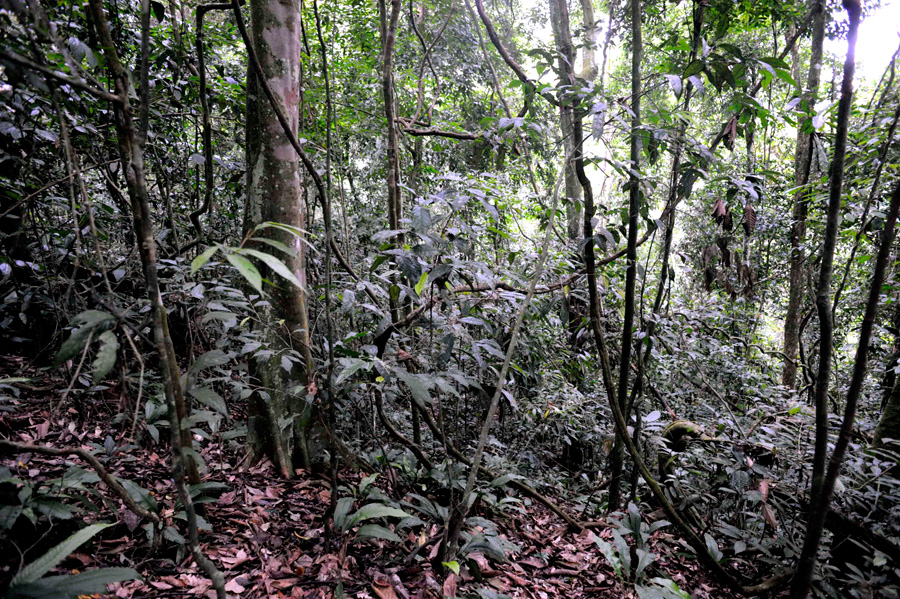
Jungle view

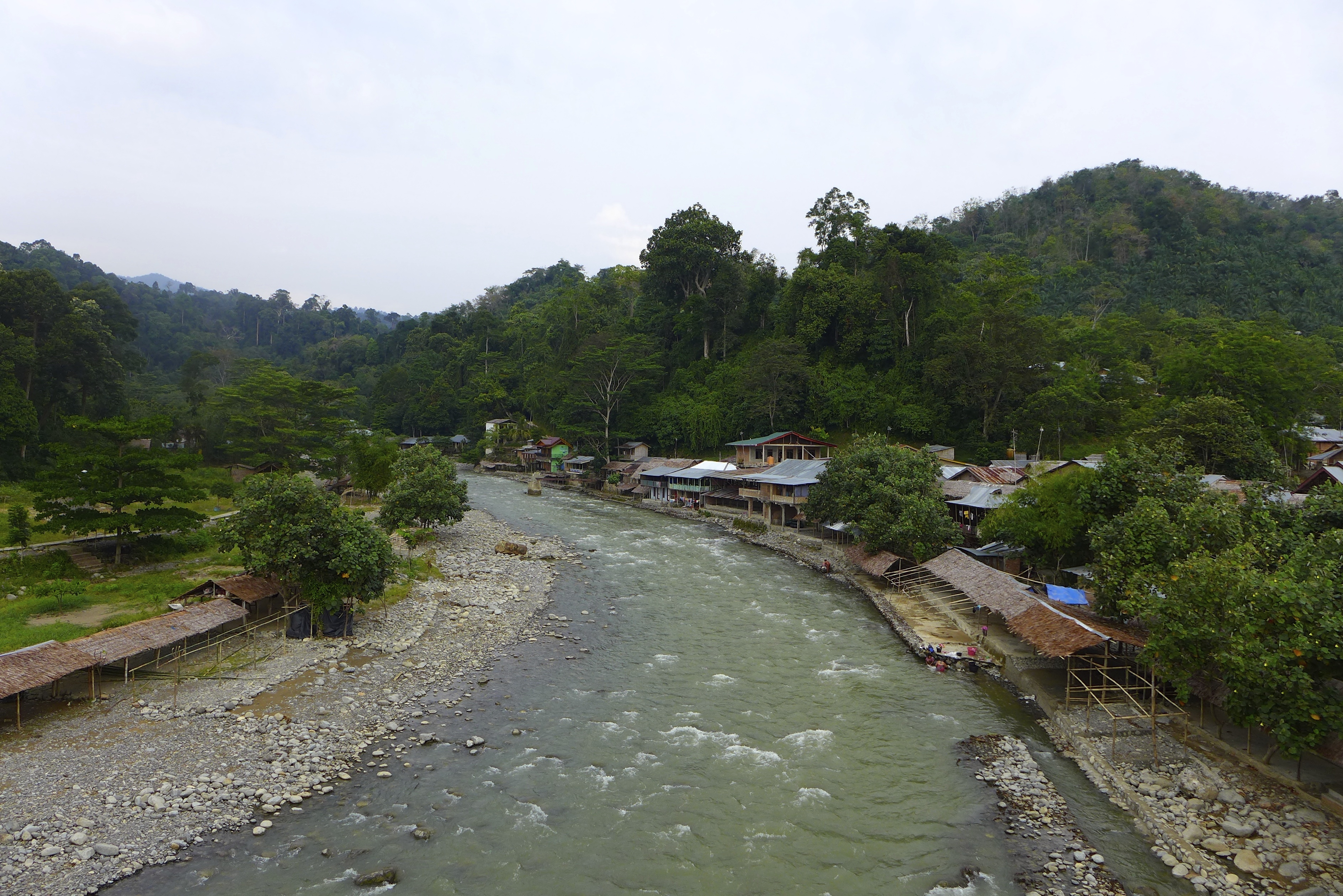
Tourist village

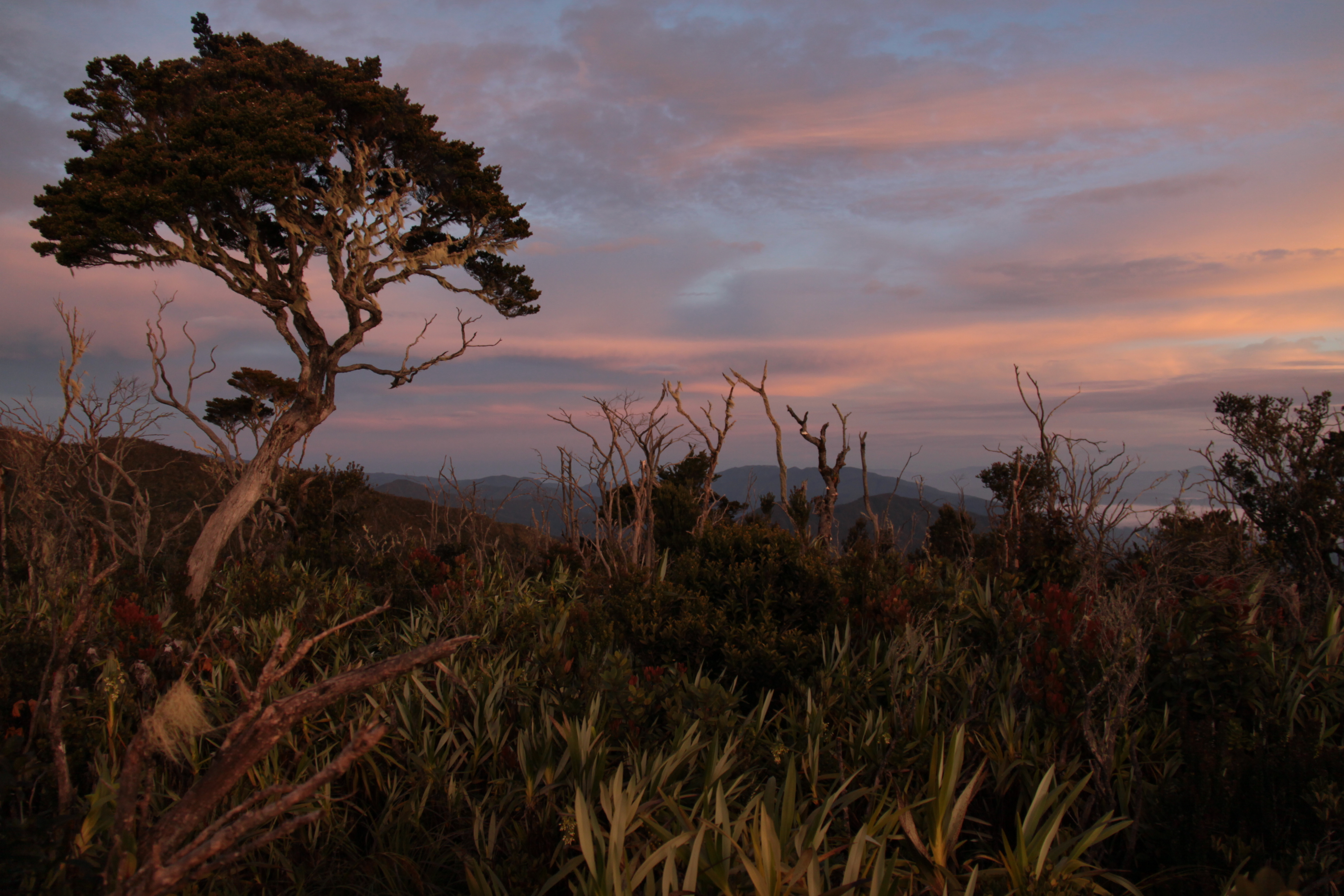
Mount Leuser sunrise

Tangkahan trekking

A 7- to 8-hour drive from Medan, Tangkahan is visited by 4,000 foreign tourists and 40,000 domestic/local tourists a year. Modest inns are available, but generation set electricity is limited. Many Tangkahan people nowadays work for tourism and avoid illegal logging, with education sometimes past the elementary school, but with training, they can serve the tourists well. All tourists should enter Tangkahan Visitor Center first, and choose the various packages, with up to 4 day and 3 night packages, the prices are fixed even for the porters. Trekking can be done by foot or using elephants.

=== Biodiversity ===
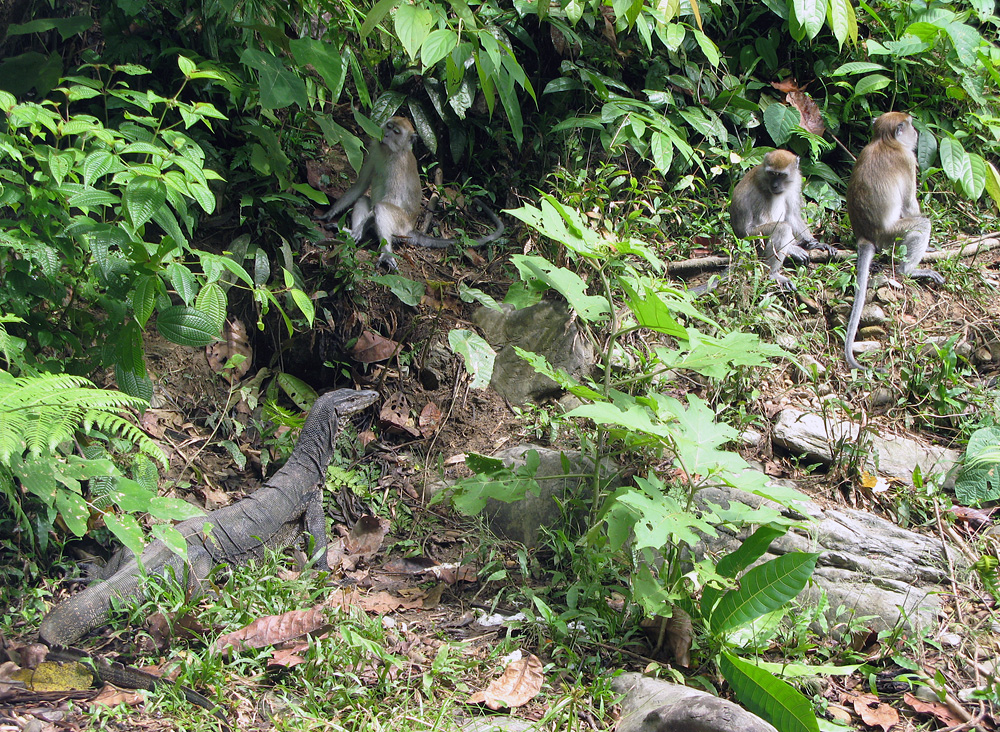
Multiple macaques and an Asian water monitor in the park

Gunung Leuser National Park is known to be an area of high biodiversity. There are an estimated 10,000 different plant species, almost 600 bird species, 200 mammal species and close to 100 species of amphibians and reptiles.

=== Carbon sequestration ===
Anthropogenic increases in the concentrations of greenhouse gases (such as CO_{2}) in the atmosphere lead to climate change. Carbon sequestration by rainforest ecosystems, therefore, has an economic value, since the carbon fixed in the ecosystem reduces or slows increases in atmospheric concentrations. Furthermore, the park's peat swamp forests sequester carbon at much higher densities than most typical rainforest ecosystems, as the thick organic soil layers store vastly more carbon than the forest biomass itself.

=== Nontimber forest products ===
Nontimber forest products can provide local communities with cash as long as exploitation does not surpass a threshold level.

== Threats ==
In November 1995, the Langkat Regency government proposed a road to connect an old enclave, known as Sapo Padang, inside the park. In pursuit of business opportunities, 34 families who had been living in the enclave formed a cooperative in March 1996 and subsequently submitted a proposal to develop an oil palm plantation in August 1997. The oil palm proposal was accepted by the regency and the head of the park agreed to the road construction.

In accordance to the government's Poverty Alleviation Program, the oil palm project proceeded with 42.5 km^{2} of clearance area, but the project caused major forest destruction in the park during its implementation. The local cooperation unit formed a partnership with PT Amal Tani, which has strong relationship with the military command in the area.^{[note 1]} In January 1998, the Indonesian Forest Ministry granted permission for 11 km road to be built. In June 1998, the local office of the Forestry Service issued a decree stating that the Sapo Padang enclave was no longer legally a part of the national park, a controversial decision, which consequently led to further forest destruction during the road construction and invited newcomers to slash and burn forest area to create local plantations a way deeper to the park. The park during this time was subject to illegal logging.

In 1999, two university-based NGOs filed a legal suit to the Medan State Court, while a group of 61 lawyers brought a parallel case in the National Administrative Court. In July 1999, the National Administrative Court rejected the case, while the local NGOs won with 30 million rupiahs damage, but the legal process continues with appeals. The legal process did not stop the project that extensive logging and clearing, road-building, and oil palm plantation continue operating inside the national park.

Pressures on locals, in a 2011 report, from palm oil profits has led to illegal slashing and burning of 21,000 hectares per year.

"Despite being protected by federal law from any form of destructive encroachment, illegal logging is still rampant in the forest, with the foliage of the Leuser ecosystem disappearing at a rate of 21,000 hectares per year."

== Relocations ==
In December 2010, 26 families comprising 84 people were moved from Gunung Leuser National Park area to Musi Banyuasin, South Sumatra. Thousands of people inhabit the park illegally, and the Indonesian government plans to move them. Many of the inhabitants are refugees from the violence and disasters in Aceh.

== See also ==
- List of national parks of Indonesia
- List of World Heritage Sites in Asia
- List of Biosphere Reserves in Indonesia
- Kappi (protected area), or "Twin Mountains", the Core Zone of the Gunung Leuser National Park

== Notes ==
^{1} PT Amal Tani was owned by the immediate family of the commander of the Indonesian army's territorial military command of the area, KODAM I Bukit Barisan. The principal function of the military partnership is to organize "administrative details" when obtaining permissions to build the roads and other related projects. The director of PT Amal Tani became the executive of the local cooperation unit. The military's unit charitable foundation, Yayasan Kodam I Bukit Barisan, also is involved in the project.
