= Leuser Range =

Mountain in Aceh, Indonesia

Mount Leuser
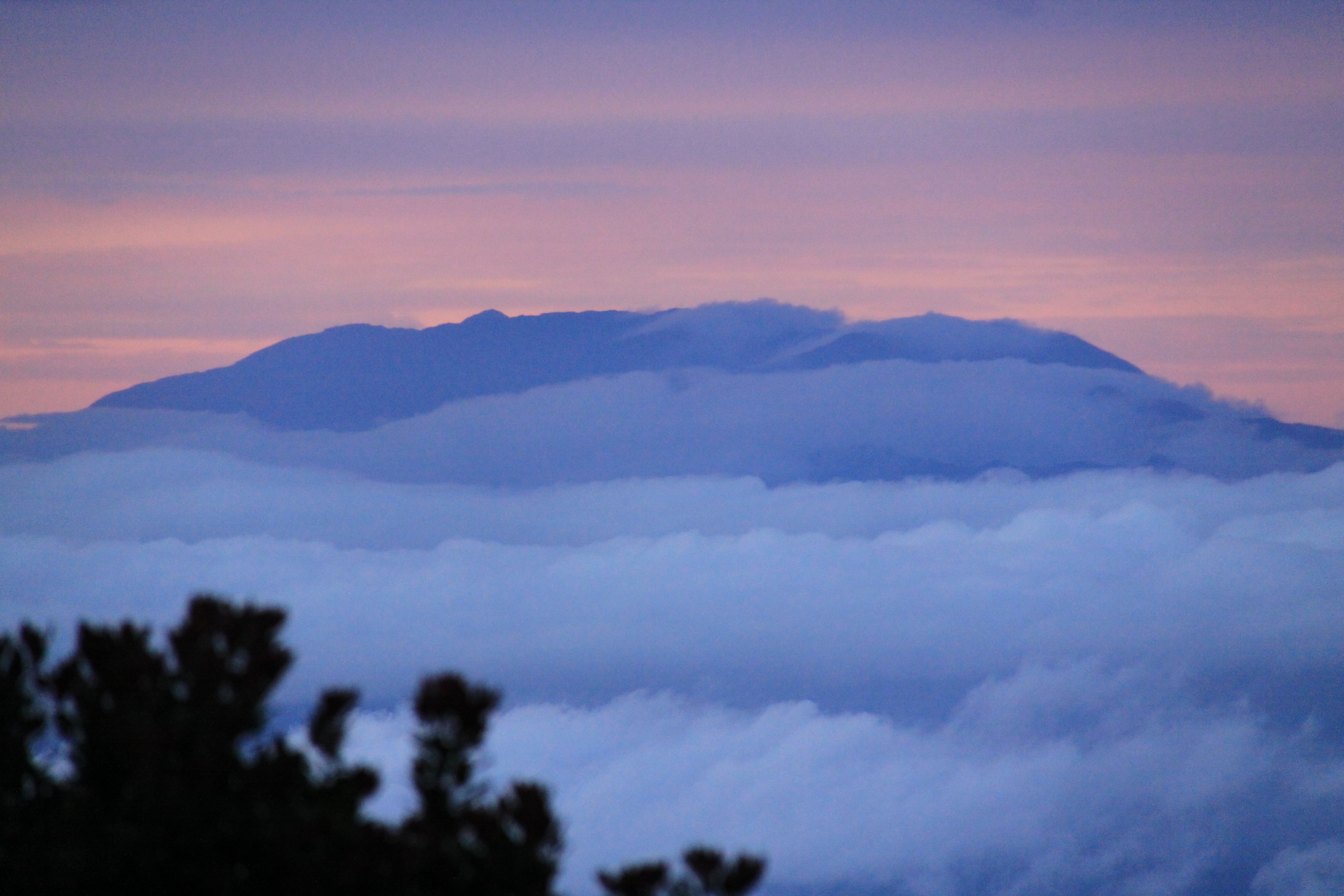
- Mount Leuser NP

Highest point
- Elevation: 3,466 m (11,371 ft)
- Prominence: 2,941 m (9,649 ft); Ranked 101st
- Coordinates: 3°44′29″N 97°9′18″E

Geography
- Location within Sumatra Location within Indonesia
- Location: Sumatra, Indonesia
- Parent range: Leuser Range, Aceh

Leuser Range or Mount Leuser (Acehnese: Gunong Leuser, Indonesian: Gunung Leuser) is a stratovolcano located in the Aceh province on the island of Sumatra, Indonesia. It is part of the Leuser Ecosystem, which is one of the most biodiverse regions in the world and a key conservation area for endangered species.

== Etymology ==
The origin of the names, Loser and Leuser, are obscure. One source informs that Leuser is a Gayo word meaning “place where animals go to die”. Local folk lore provides a not-unrelated story: a Dutch officer was hunting deer on the Leuser Range in colonial times and accidentally shot his hunting partner on the Loser peak. The porters, accompanying the party, used the Gayo word, los, meaning “dead”, to describe the fate of the partner.

Mounts Loser and Leuser, by comparison with Mount Tanpa Nama, rise from the east with precipitous drop-offs on their western faces over the rugged escarpment towards the west coast of Aceh. Most trekkers set Mount Loser as their objective, being the higher and more accessible of the two peaks.

== Geography ==
Mount Leuser is situated within the Gunung Leuser National Park, a UNESCO World Heritage Site. It rises to an elevation of approximately 3,404 meters (11,168 feet) above sea level. The volcano is part of the Bukit Barisan mountain range, which extends along the western side of Sumatra. The area surrounding Mount Leuser features rugged terrain, dense tropical rainforest, and numerous rivers and streams.

== Geology ==
The volcanic activity of Mount Leuser is characterized by its stratovolcano structure, consisting of layers of hardened lava, volcanic ash, and rocks. While the volcano has been relatively dormant in recent history, it is part of a seismically active region prone to occasional volcanic and tectonic activity.

== Flora and fauna ==
Mount Leuser and its surrounding ecosystem are renowned for their rich biodiversity. The Leuser Ecosystem is home to a wide array of plant and animal species, including endangered species such as the Sumatran orangutan, Sumatran tiger, and Sumatran rhinoceros. The forests around Mount Leuser also support diverse plant life, including rare and endemic species.

== Conservation ==
The conservation of Mount Leuser and the surrounding Leuser Ecosystem is critical due to the area's ecological significance and the threats posed by deforestation and habitat destruction. Efforts are ongoing to protect and preserve this unique environment through various conservation programs and initiatives aimed at sustainable development and wildlife protection.

== Tourism ==
Mount Leuser is a popular destination for eco-tourists and adventurers seeking to explore its rich biodiversity and dramatic landscapes. Trekking and wildlife observation are common activities, with guided tours available to ensure a minimal impact on the environment.

== Peaks on the Leuser Range ==
The Leuser Range is a group of three peaks in the Indonesian province of Aceh. The range lies to the south and west of the Alas River that flows east from the highlands of central Aceh before turning south through Karo Highland in North Sumatra province. The Leuser region is of ancient uplifted formations - it is non-volcanic. The region is billed as the largest wilderness area in South-East Asia. It is often assumed, incorrectly, that the highest peak is Mount Leuser when in fact it is Mount Tanpa Nama. Mount Leuser is the lowest of the three peaks.

BAKOSURTANAL, the Indonesian Survey and Mapping Agency, provides the names and locations of Loser and Leuser on their topographical maps. The Gunung Leuser National Park (GLNP) authorities have adopted these names and their locations.

The altitude, coordinates and prominence of the three summits are:

- Tanpa Nama (true summit): 3,466 m (11,317 ft); 3.7976 N (3°47'51"N), 97.2192 E (97°13’9”E); prominence 2,941 m (9,649 ft)
- Loser: 3,404 m (11,178 ft); 3.7567 N (3°45'24"N), 97.173 E (97°10’24”E); prominence 319 m (1,047 ft)
- Leuser: 3,119 m (10,348 ft); 3.7413 N (3°44'29"N), 97.1551 E (97°9’18”E); prominence 107 m (351 ft)

=== Mount Tanpa Nama ===
Mount Tanpa Nama, 3,466 m (11,317 ft), which in Indonesian translates to "nameless mountain", is the second highest peak in Sumatra after Mount Kerinci (3,805 m, 12,484 ft). The peak lies inland from the escarpment, is easy to climb, and has views in all directions. The mountain has two knolls: a painted sign on the lower knoll (3,455 m, 11,335 ft) reads “Puncak Tanpa Nama” (summit of Mount Tanpa Nama). On the higher, more prominent knoll to the north-east, the true summit, a plaque embedded in a cement block reads, “Prof Dr Syamsuddin Mahmud, Governor Aceh, 1997 ...”.

== See also ==
- List of ultras of the Malay Archipelago
