= Kappi Plateau =

Forest plateau in Aceh, Indonesia

The Kappi Plateau, or Twin Mountains, is the Core Zone of the Gunung Leuser National Park (TNGL) in Aceh, which has 150,000 hectares of dense forest and is the main source of water for the people of Aceh Tamiang, East Aceh, and part of Gayo Lues.

== Description ==
This area is also a habitat for rare animals such as elephants, rhinos, tigers, and Sumatran orangutans. Damage to the Kappi Plateau will worsen the Tamiang River Basin (DAS), most of which originates in this area, and threaten the survival of wildlife. However, plans to change the status of the Kappi Plateau from the Core Zone to the Utilization Zone for the construction of a geothermal power plant have been rejected by various parties because it will damage this natural ecosystem. Experts emphasize the importance of maintaining the Kappi Plateau as one of the last intact flat forests in Sumatra. Destroying the Kappi Plateau not only threatens environmental sustainability but also the lives of the people who depend on this ecosystem.
