= Bukit Barisan Selatan National Park =

National park in Sumatra, Indonesia

- Taman Nasional Bukit Barisan Selatan
- IUCN category II (national park)
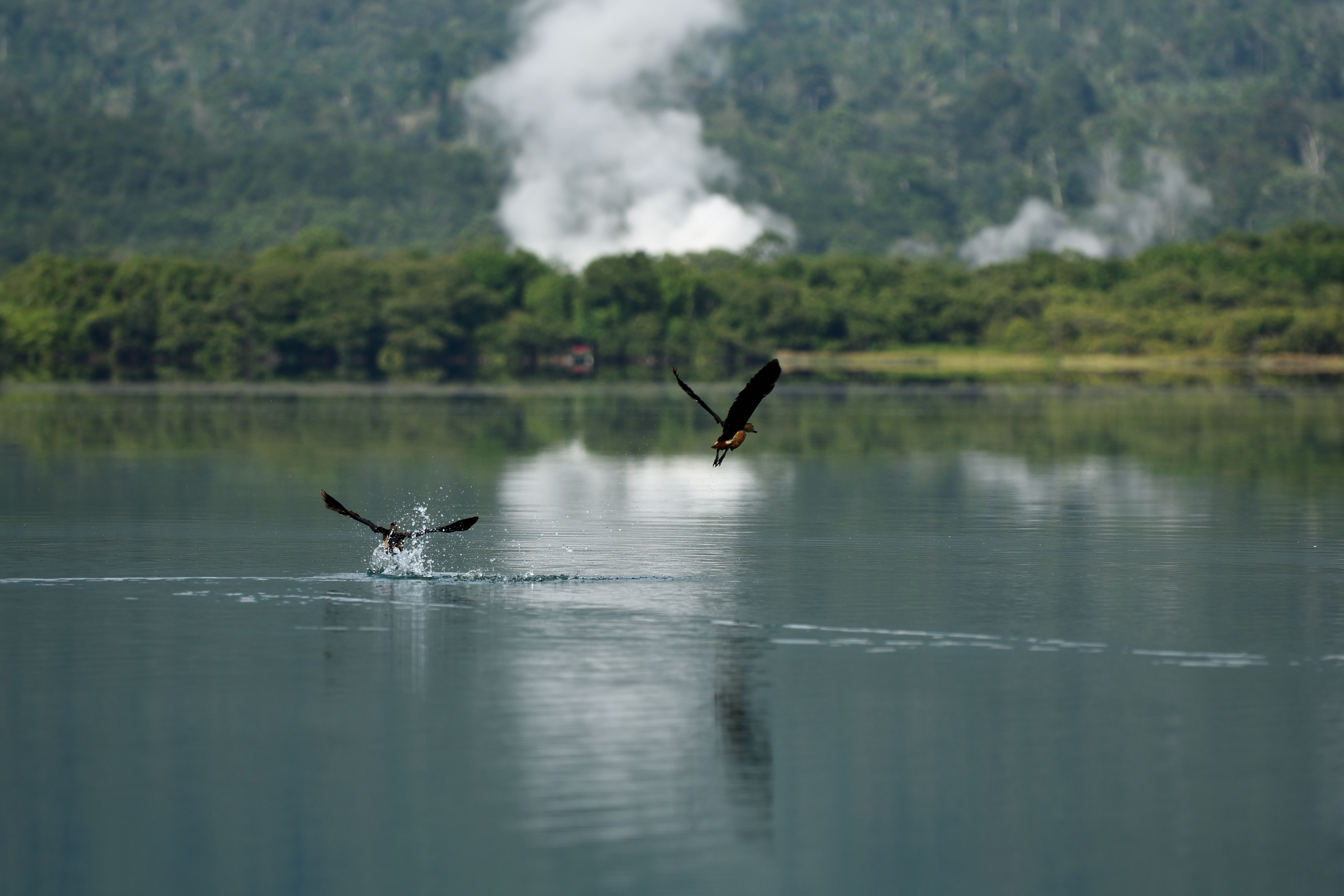
- Two belibis at Asam Lake on Lampung Province area

- Location within Sumatra Location within Indonesia
- Location: Sumatra, Indonesia
- Coordinates: 5°26′S 104°20′E
- Area: 356,800 hectares (882,000 acres; 3,568 km^{2})
- Established: 1982
- Governing body: Ministry of Environment and Forestry
- World Heritage site: 2004

UNESCO World Heritage Site
- Type: Natural
- Criteria: vii, ix, x
- Designated: 2004 (28th session)
- Part of: Tropical Rainforest Heritage of Sumatra
- Reference no.: 1167
- Region: Asia-Pacific
- Endangered: 2011–present

Bukit Barisan Selatan National Park (South Barisan Mountains National Park) is a national park in Sumatra, Indonesia. The park located along the Bukit Barisan mountain range, has a total area of 3,568 km^{2}, and spans parts of three provinces: Lampung, Bengkulu, and South Sumatra. Together with Gunung Leuser National Park and Kerinci Seblat National Park, it forms a World Heritage Site - the Tropical Rainforest Heritage of Sumatra.

A signboard containing a welcome message to Bukit Barisan Selatan National Park a few kilometers away from the town of Liwa, the administrative capital of West Lampung Regency in Lampung Province. The secondary forest of Bukit Barisan National Park is designated by UNESCO as a world heritage site.

== Flora and fauna ==
The national park stretching along the Bukit Barisan mountain range is in average only 45 km wide but 350 km long. The northern part is mountainous with its highest point at Gunung Pulung (1,964 m), while its southern section is a peninsula. It is covered by montane forest, lowland tropical forest, coastal forest and mangrove forest.

Plants in the park include Nipa palm, Casuarina equisetifolia, Anisoptera curtisii and Gonystylus bancanus, as well as species of Sonneratia, Pandanus, Anthoshorea, Shorea, and Dipterocarpus. Large flowers in the park include the Rafflesia arnoldii, Amorphophallus decus-silvae, Amorphophallus titanum and the world's largest orchid the Grammatophyllum speciosum.

The park is home to many endangered and threatened species, including:

- Sumatran elephant (about 500 animals, or 25% of the total remaining population of this subspecies live in the park)
- Sumatran striped rabbit (most recent records of this poorly known species have been from the park)
- Sumatran rhinoceros (an estimated 17-24 Sumatran rhinos live in the park; approximately the same number live in Gunung Leuser National Park, along with approximately 30–35 in Way Kambas National Park, comprising a total population of fewer than 100 animals
- Sumatran tiger (approximately 40 adult tigers or 10% of the remaining Sumatran tigers live in the park).

Other animals in the park are the Malayan tapir, siamang, Sumatran surili, sun bear and lesser mouse-deer. There are over 300 species of bird in the park, like the critically endangered Sumatran ground-cuckoo.

== Conservation and threats ==
The area was first protected by the Dutch East Indies government in 1935, that declared the South Sumatra I Nature Reserve. The area became a national park in 1982.

Since the 1970s there have been numerous squatters established within the park, and despite forced evictions in the early 1980s, their numbers increased since 1998. In 2006, it was estimated that the squatter encroachment by about 127,000 people covered an area of 55,000 ha. For the period between 1972 and 2006, it is estimated that 63,000 ha of primary forest cover has been lost. This represents 20% of the forests lost to illegal agriculture. The World Wide Fund for Nature found that more than 450 km^{2} of park land is being used for growing coffee, and the organisation is now working with multinational coffee companies to help them avoid buying illegally grown coffee.

In 2021 this situation is still pending.

== See also ==
- List of national parks of Indonesia
