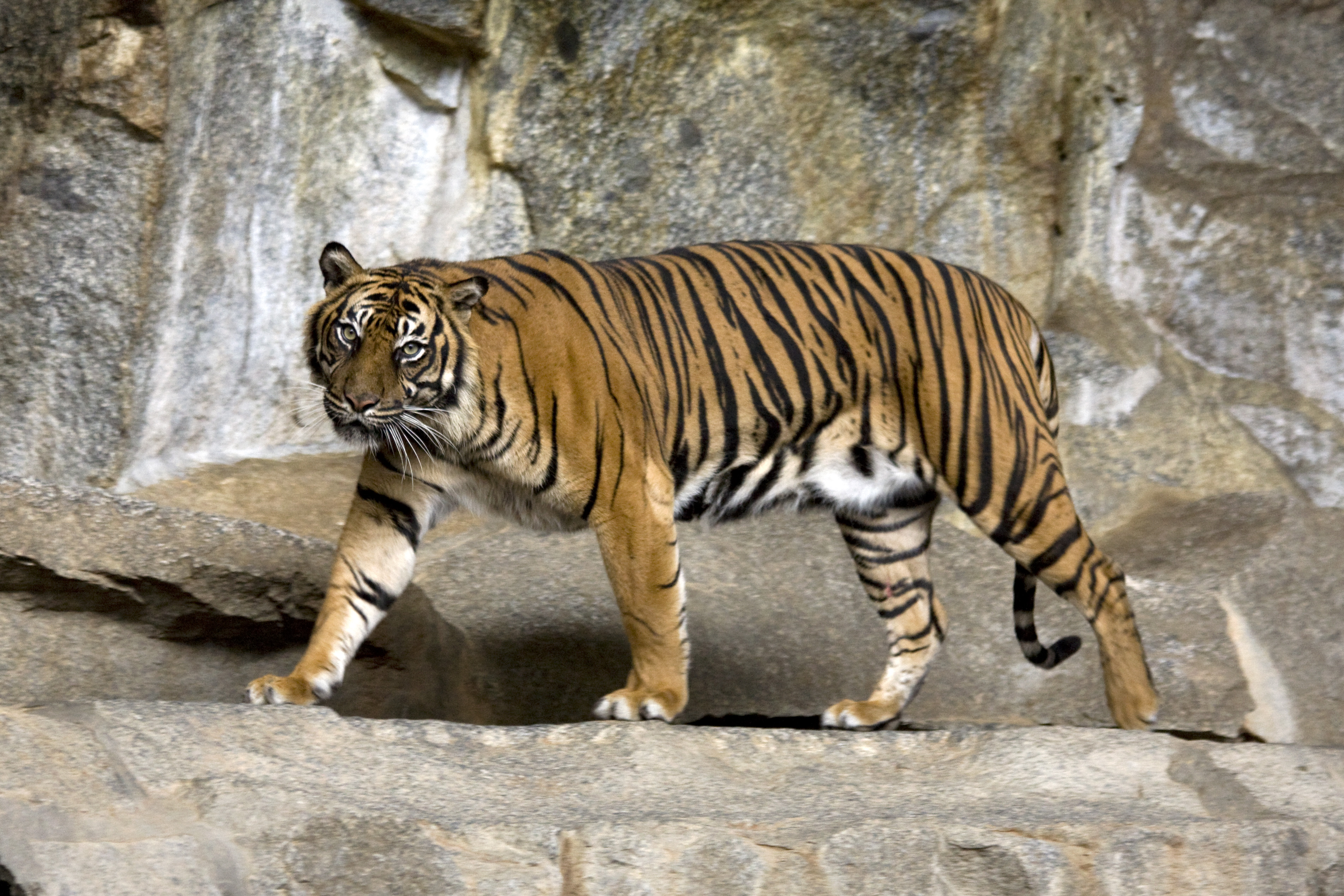
- Sumatran tiger in the Tierpark Berlin

Scientific classification
- Kingdom: Animalia
- Phylum: Chordata
- Class: Mammalia
- Order: Carnivora
- Family: Felidae
- Genus: Panthera
- Species: P. tigris
- Subspecies: P. t. sondaica
- Population: Sumatran tiger
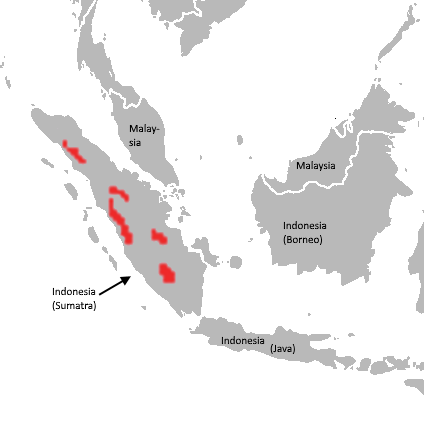
- Distribution of the Sumatran tiger

= Sumatran tiger =

Tiger subspecies endemic to Sumatra

The Sumatran tiger is a population of Panthera tigris sondaica on the Indonesian island of Sumatra. It is the only surviving tiger population in the Sunda Islands, as the Bali and Javan tigers went extinct during the 20th century.

Sequences from complete mitochondrial genes of 34 tigers support the hypothesis that Sumatran tigers are diagnostically distinct from existing mainland subspecies. In 2017, the Cat Classification Task Force of the Cat Specialist Group revised felid taxonomy and recognizes the living and extinct tiger populations in Indonesia as P. t. sondaica.

== Taxonomy ==
Felis tigris sondaicus was the scientific name proposed by Coenraad Jacob Temminck in 1844 for a tiger specimen from Java.

Panthera tigris sumatrae was proposed by Reginald Innes Pocock in 1929, who described a skin and a skull of a tiger zoological specimen from Sumatra. The skull and pelage pattern of tiger specimens from Java and Sumatra do not differ significantly. P. t. sondaica is therefore considered the valid name for the living and extinct tiger populations in Indonesia.

== Evolution ==
Analysis of DNA is consistent with the hypothesis that Sumatran tigers became isolated from other tiger populations after a rise in sea level that occurred at the Pleistocene to Holocene transition about 12,000–6,000 years ago. In agreement with this evolutionary history, the Sumatran tiger is genetically isolated from all living mainland tigers, which form a distinct group closely related to each other. The isolation of the Sumatran tiger from mainland tiger populations is supported by multiple unique characters, including two diagnostic mitochondrial DNA nucleotide sites, ten mitochondrial DNA haplotypes and 11 out of 108 unique microsatellite alleles. The relatively high genetic variability and the phylogenetic distinctiveness of the Sumatran tiger indicates that the gene flow between island and mainland populations was highly restricted.

== Characteristics ==
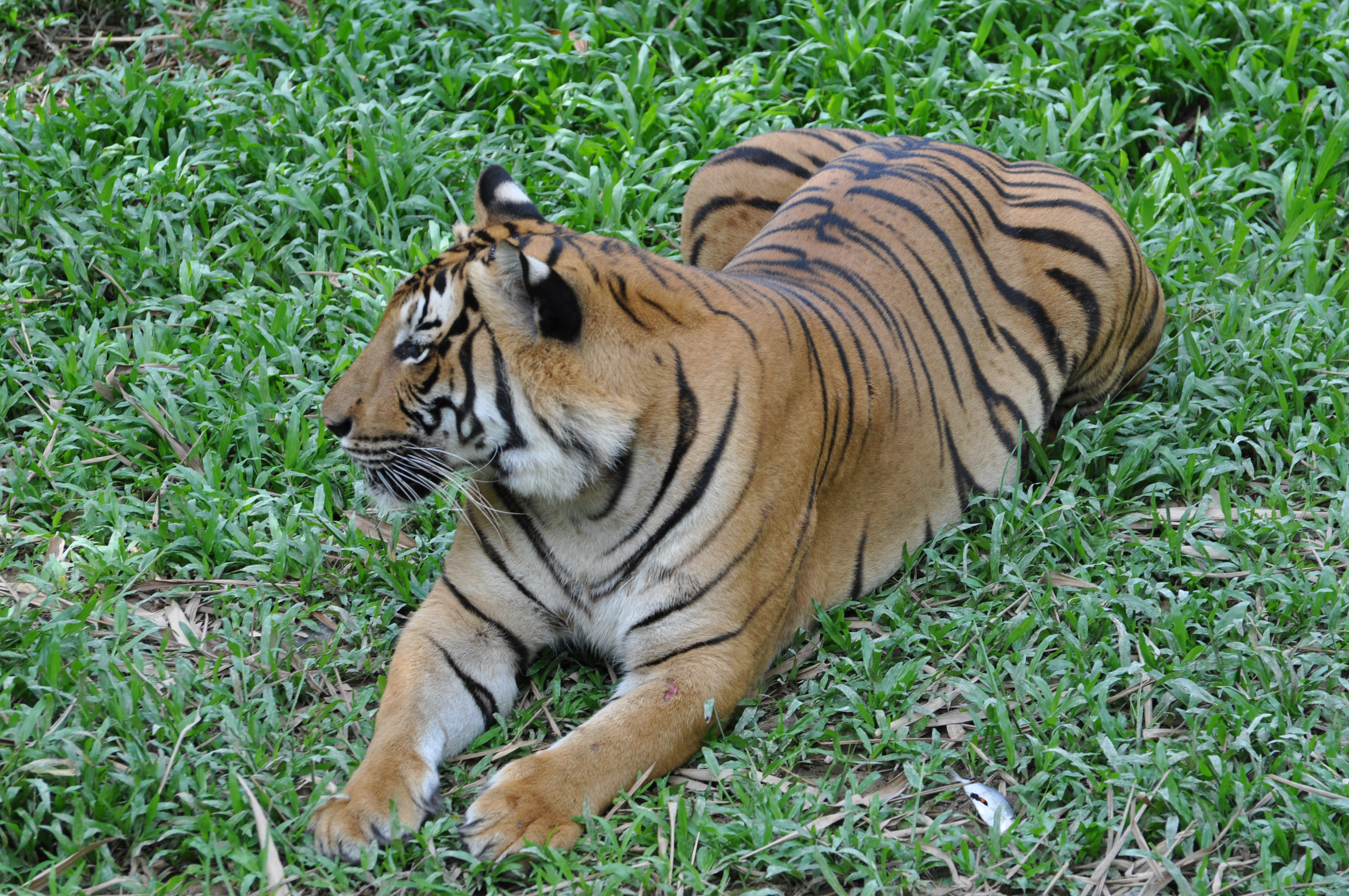
Resting Sumatran tiger in Lok Kawi Wildlife Park

The Sumatran tiger was described based on two zoological specimens that differed in skull size and striping pattern from Bengal and Javan tiger specimens. It is darker in fur colour and has broader stripes than the Javan tiger. Stripes tend to dissolve into spots near their ends, and on the back, flanks and hind legs are lines of small, dark spots between the regular stripes. The frequency of stripes is higher than in other subspecies. Males have a prominent ruff, which is especially marked in the Sumatran tiger.

The Sumatran tiger is one of the smallest tigers. Males measure between the pegs 2.2 to 2.55 m (7 ft 3 in to 8 ft 4 in) in head-to-body length, with the greatest skull length of 295 to 335 mm (11.6 to 13.2 in) and weigh 100 to 140 kg (220 to 310 lb). Females weigh 75 to 110 kg (165 to 243 lb) and measure 2.15 to 2.30 m (7 ft 1 in to 7 ft 7 in) in length between the pegs with a greatest length of skull of 263 to 294 mm (10.4 to 11.6 in).

=== Genomics ===
A near telomere-to-telomere chromosome-level genome assembly of the Sumatran tiger was published in 2026; the genome is approximately 2.46 Gb in size, spans 19 chromosomes, has a BUSCO completeness of 95.3%, and 23,737 protein-coding genes were predicted.

== Distribution and habitat ==
The Sumatran tiger persists in small and fragmented populations across Sumatra, from sea level in the coastal lowland forest of Bukit Barisan Selatan National Park on the southeastern tip of Lampung Province to 3,200 m (10,500 ft) in mountain forests of Gunung Leuser National Park in Aceh Province. It is present in 27 habitat patches larger than 250 km^{2} (97 sq mi), which cover 140,226 km^{2} (54,142 sq mi). About a third of these patches are inside protected areas.

Sumatran tigers prefer lowland and hill forests, where up to three tigers live in an area of 100 km^{2} (39 sq mi); they use non-forest habitats and human-dominated landscapes at the fringes of protected areas to a lesser degree.

In 1978, the Sumatran tiger population was estimated at 1,000 individuals, based on responses to a questionnaire survey. In 1985, a total of 26 protected areas across Sumatra containing about 800 tigers were identified. In 1992, an estimated 400–500 tigers lived in five Sumatran national parks and two protected areas. At that time, the largest population unit comprised 110–180 individuals in Gunung Leuser National Park. As of 2011, the tiger population in Kerinci Seblat National Park in central Sumatra comprised 165–190 individuals, which is more than anywhere else on the island. The park has the highest tiger occupancy rate of Sumatra's protected areas, with 83% of the park showing signs of tigers.

Sumatra's total tiger population was estimated at 618 ± 290 individuals in 2017.

== Ecology and behaviour ==
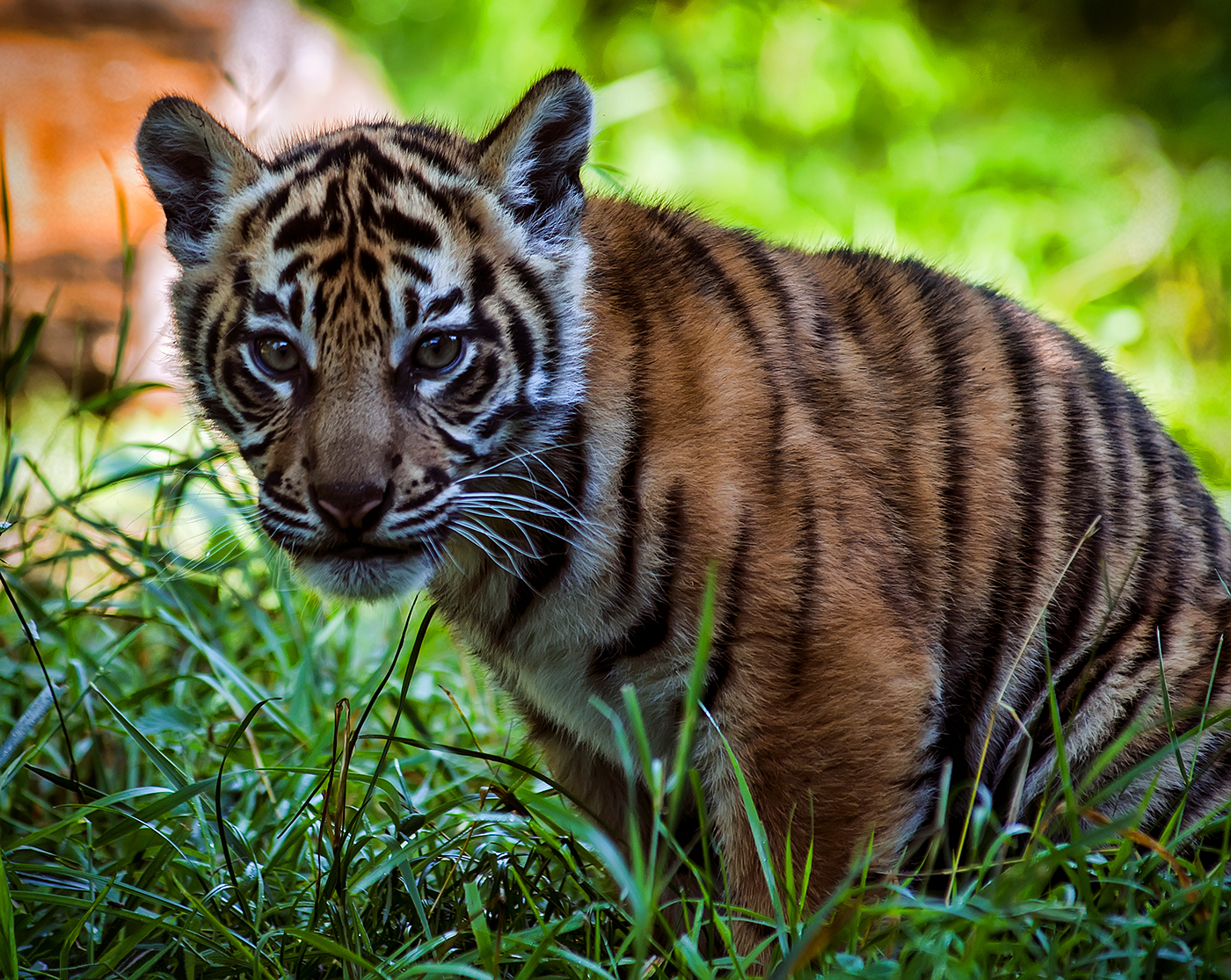
Sumatran tiger cub at Chester Zoo

Sumatran tigers strongly prefer uncultivated forests and make little use of plantations of acacia and oil palm even if these are available. Within natural forest areas, they tend to use areas with higher elevation, lower annual rainfall, farther from the forest edge, and closer to forest centres. They prefer forest with dense understory cover and steep slope, and they strongly avoid forest areas with high human influence in the forms of encroachment and settlement. In acacia plantations, they tend to use areas closer to water and prefer areas with older plants, more leaf litter, and thicker subcanopy cover. Tiger records in oil palm plantations and rubber plantations are scarce. The availability of adequate vegetation cover at the ground level serves as an environmental condition fundamentally needed by tigers regardless of the location. Without adequate understory cover, tigers are even more vulnerable to persecution by humans. Human disturbance-related variables negatively affect tiger occupancy and habitat use. Variables with strong impacts include settlement and encroachment within forest areas, logging, and the intensity of maintenance in acacia plantations. Camera trapping surveys conducted in southern Riau revealed an extremely low abundance of potential prey and a low tiger density in peat swamp forest areas. Repeated sampling in the newly established Tesso Nilo National Park documented a trend of increasing tiger density from 0.90 individuals per 100 km^{2} (39 sq mi) in 2005 to 1.70 individuals per 100 km^{2} (39 sq mi) in 2008.

In the Bukit Barisan Selatan National Park, nine prey species larger than 1 kg (2.2 lb) of body weight were identified including great argus, southern pig-tailed macaque, Malayan porcupine, Malayan tapir, banded pig, greater and lesser mouse-deer, southern red muntjac, and Sambar deer.

== Threats ==
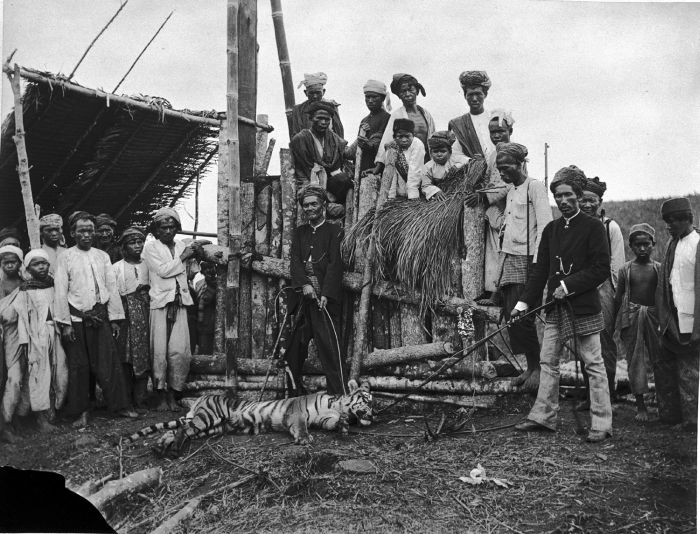
People with a trapped tiger in Soepajang, Bovenlanden Padang on Sumatra's west coast, 1895.

Major threats include habitat loss due to expansion of palm oil plantations and planting of acacia plantations, prey-base depletion, and illegal trade primarily for the domestic market. Conflicts with humans are another major threat to the Sumatran tiger. Poachers target tigers with wire snares, and they are also inadvertently caught in traps set by deer hunters and farmers attempting to control crop raids from wild boar.

Tigers need large contiguous forest blocks to thrive. Between 1985 and 1999, forest loss within Bukit Barisan Selatan National Park averaged 2% per year. A total of 661 km^{2} (255 sq mi) of forest disappeared inside the park, and 318 km^{2} (123 sq mi) were lost in a 10-km buffer, eliminating forest outside the park. Lowland forest disappeared faster than montane forest, and forests on gentle slopes disappeared faster than forests on steep slopes. Most forest conversions resulted from agricultural development, leading to predictions that by 2010, 70% of the park will be in agriculture. Camera-trap data indicated avoidance of forest boundaries by tigers. Classification of forest into core and peripheral forest based on mammal distribution suggests that by 2010, core forest area for tigers will be fragmented and reduced to 20% of the remaining forest.

Sumatra's largest tiger population in Kerinci Seblat National Park is threatened by a high rate of deforestation in its outer regions. Drivers are an unsustainable demand for natural resources created by a human population with the highest rate of growth in Indonesia, and a government initiative to increase tree-crop plantations and high-intensity commercial logging, which ultimately leads to forest fires. The majority of the tigers found in the park were relocated to its center where conservation efforts are focused, but issues in the lowland hill forests of the outskirts remain. While being a highly suitable tiger habitat, these areas are also heavily targeted by logging efforts, which substantially contributes to declines in local tiger numbers.

The expansion of plantations is increasing greenhouse gas emissions, playing a part in anthropogenic climate change, thus further adding to environmental pressures on endangered species. Climate-based movement of tigers northwards may lead to increased conflict with people. From 1987 to 1997, Sumatran tigers reportedly killed 146 people and at least 870 livestock. In West Sumatra, Riau, and Aceh, a total of 128 incidents were reported; 265 tigers were killed and 97 captured in response, and 35 more tigers were killed from 1998 to 2002. From 2007 to 2010, the tigers caused the death of 9 humans and 25 further tigers were killed.

In 1997, an estimated 53 tigers were killed by poachers and their parts sold throughout most of northern Sumatra. Numbers for all of Sumatra are likely to be higher. Farmers killed many of the tigers to prevent livestock losses. They sold them to gold and souvenir shops, and pharmacies. In 2006, wildlife markets were surveyed in 28 cities and nine seaports in seven Sumatran provinces; 33 of 326 retail outlets offered tiger parts like skins, canines, bones, and whiskers. Tiger bones fetched the highest average price of US$116 per kg, followed by canines. There is evidence that tiger parts are smuggled out of Indonesia. In July 2005, over 140 kg (310 lb) of tiger bones and 24 skulls were confiscated in Taiwan in a shipment from Jakarta.

In 2013–2014, Kerinci Seblat National Park experienced an upsurge in poaching, with the highest annual number of snare traps being removed for a patrol effort similar to previous years. Evidence is scarce and misunderstood on whether the strategies implemented to diminish poaching are succeeding despite the investment of millions of dollars annually into conservation strategies. In provincially-managed forests in Aceh province, Sumatran tigers are threatened by poaching due to insufficient or nonexistent ranger patrols. Between January 2020 and June 2025, 127 tigers were confiscated in 77 seizures in Indonesia.

== Conservation ==
Panthera tigris is listed on CITES Appendix I. Hunting is prohibited in Indonesia.

In 1994, the Indonesian Sumatran Tiger Conservation Strategy addressed the potential crisis that tigers faced in Sumatra. The Sumatran Tiger Project (STP) was initiated in June 1995 in and around the Way Kambas National Park to ensure the long-term viability of wild Sumatran tigers and to accumulate data on tiger life-history characteristics vital for the management of wild populations. By August 1999, the teams of the STP had evaluated 52 sites of potential tiger habitat in Lampung Province, of which only 15 were intact enough to contain tigers. In the framework of the STP, a community-based conservation programme was initiated to document the tiger-human dimension in the park to enable conservation authorities to resolve tiger-human conflicts based on a comprehensive database rather than anecdotes and opinions.

In 2007, the Indonesian Forestry Ministry and Safari Park established cooperation with the Australia Zoo for the conservation of Sumatran tigers and other endangered species. The program includes conserving Sumatran tigers and other endangered species in the wild, efforts to reduce conflicts between tigers and humans, and rehabilitating Sumatran tigers and reintroducing them to their natural habitat. Indonesia's struggle with conservation has caused an upsurge in political momentum to protect and conserve wildlife and biodiversity. In 2009, Indonesia's president committed to substantially reduce deforestation, and policies across the nation requiring spatial plans that would be environmentally sustainable at national, provincial, and district levels.

Between 2005 and 2015, about US$210 million have been invested into tiger law-enforcement activities that support forest ranger patrols, as well as the implementations of front-line law-enforcement activities by the Global Tiger Recovery Plan, which aims to double the number of wild tigers by 2020. In November 2016, Batu Nanggar Sanctuary was opened in North Padang Lawas Regency, North Sumatra for conservation of Sumatran wildlife.

An interview survey among 600 consumers revealed that most were willing to pay consistently more for a "tiger-friendly" produced good if this product would be conducive to Sumatran tiger conservation.

=== In captivity ===
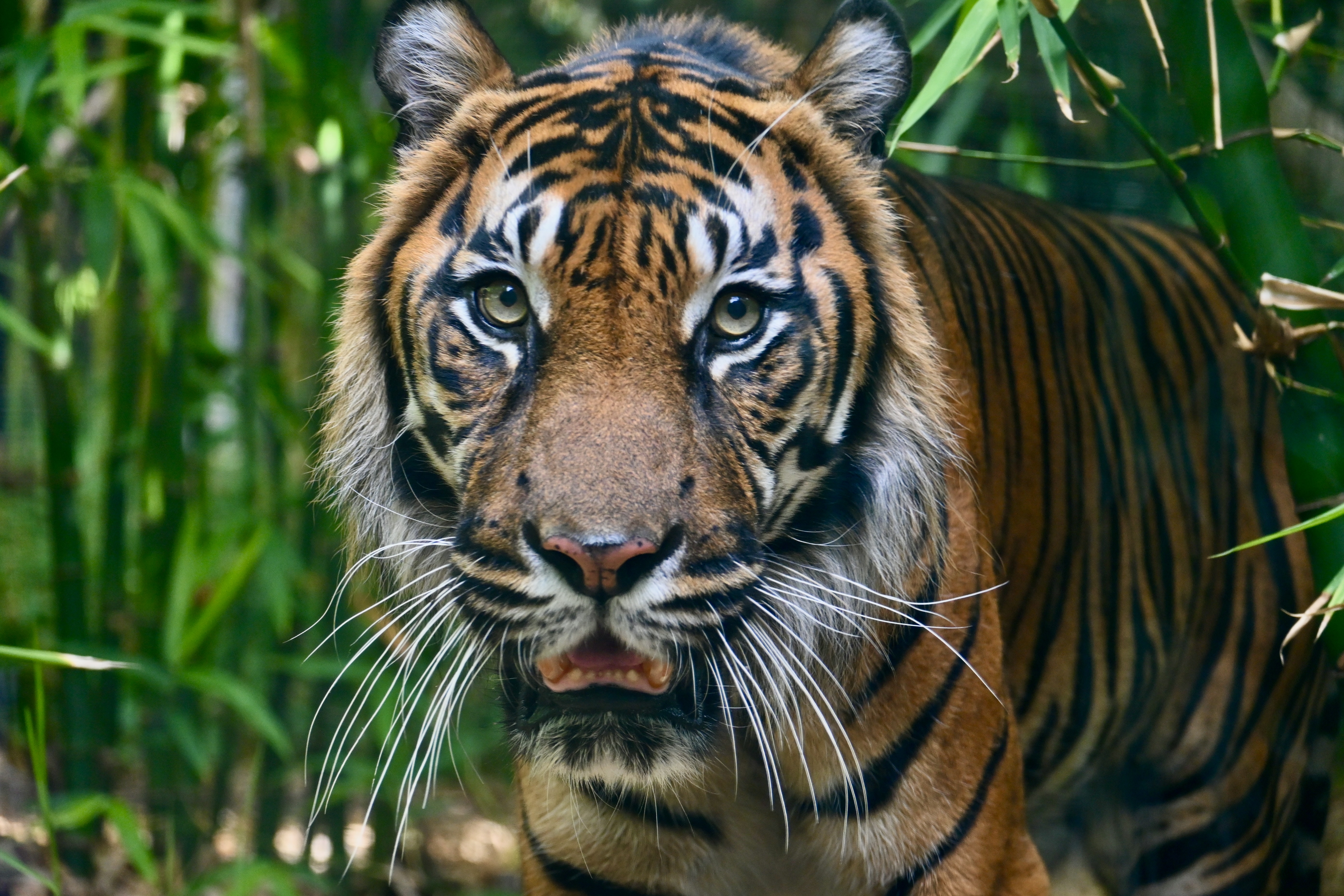
Sumatran tiger in Perth Zoo

As of 2013, about 375 captive Sumatran tigers were listed in the global studbook and management plan, with 50 of them housed in 14 zoos in Australia and New Zealand. All of them were offspring of 15 founders. Fourteen cubs showed congenital vestibular system dysfunctions such as ataxia, strabismus, nystagmus, head tilting and falling that resolved when they were two years old. The cause for this disorder is most likely their close genetic relation and inbreeding.

== See also ==
- Panthera tigris tigris
- Panthera tigris soloensis
- Panthera tigris trinilensis
- Panthera tigris acutidens
