= FAM120AOS =

Protein-coding gene in the species Homo sapiens

Identifiers
- Aliases: FAM120AOS, C9orf10OS, family with sequence similarity 120A opposite strand
- External IDs: HomoloGene: 131283; GeneCards: FAM120AOS; OMA:FAM120AOS - orthologs

Gene location (Human)
Chr.	Chromosome 9 (human)
Band	9q22.31	Start	93,431,441 bp
Band	9q22.31	End	93,453,581 bp
RNA expression pattern
Bgee	Human / Mouse (ortholog); Top expressed in: cardiac muscle tissue of right atrium; anterior pituitary; mucosa of ileum; gonad; myocardium of left ventricle; rectum; right coronary artery; skin of arm; popliteal artery; tibial arteries / n/a; More reference expression data
BioGPS	n/a
Orthologs
Species	Human	Mouse
Entrez	158293	n/a
Ensembl	ENSG00000188938	n/a
UniProt	Q5T036	n/a
RefSeq (mRNA)	NM_198841; NM_001322224	n/a
RefSeq (protein)	NP_001309153; NP_942138	n/a
Location (UCSC)	Chr 9: 93.43 – 93.45 Mb	n/a
PubMed search		n/a
- Wikidata
View/Edit Human

FAM120AOS, or family with sequence similarity 120A opposite strand, codes for uncharacterized protein FAM120AOS, which currently has no known function. The gene ontology describes the gene to be protein binding. Overall, it appears that the thyroid and the placenta are the two tissues with the highest expression levels of FAM120AOS across a majority of datasets.

The microarray-assessed tissue expression pattern of multiple normal tissues for FAM120AOS in humans was found using GDS3834 data. The three tissues in the 90th percentile and higher for FAM120AOS gene expression are as follows: the bladder, epididymis, and thyroid. The thyroid is in the 91st percentile, while the other two are in the 90th percentile. Since high thyroid expression was also seen across the RNA-seq data, it appears that FAM120AOS expression may be important in the thyroid.

== Gene ==
=== Common aliases ===
The common aliases for FAM120AOS are C9orf10OS, FLJ31534, LOC158293, and putative FAM120A opposite strand protein.

=== Locus ===
There are two genomic locations for the gene, the first of which is chr9:93,431,441-93,453,601(GRCh38/hg38) with a length of 22,161 base pairs (bp), oriented on the minus strand of the chromosome. The second genomic location for the gene is at chr9:96,208,776-96,215,874(GRCh37/hg19) with a length of 7,099 bp, also oriented on the minus strand of the chromosome. The genes found upstream of FAM120AOS on chromosome 9 are FGD3, SUSD, C9orf89, WNK2, C9orf129, and NINJ1. The genes found downstream from FAM120AOS on chromosome 9 are FAM120A and PHF2.

=== Number of exons ===
The longest isoform of FAM120AOS in humans contains 3 exons.

=== Span of gene ===
The mRNA transcript variant that encodes for human FAM120AOS isoform 1 is 5922 bp long and contains an upstream in-frame stop codon (taa) at 807-809 bp.

== Transcripts ==
There are 12 known isoforms of the human FAM120AOS gene. The longest and most common transcript variant is isoform 1, which is 5922 bp in length. Transcript variants 3-12 are all non-coding RNAs, meaning that they do not code for a protein. The only isoforms that are protein-encoding are isoform 1 and 2 of the human FAM120AOS gene.

Isoform 2 is 5008 bp in length and contains an alternate exon in the 5' UTR, is missing a portion of the 5' coding region, and initiates translation at an alternate start codon, in comparison to isoform 1. The variant also has a shorter and more distinct N-terminus in comparison to isoform 1.

=== Non-coding RNAS ===
All of the following variations mentioned are in comparison to isoform 1 of the human FAM120AOS gene. Isoform 3 is 2199 bp and uses an alternate splice site in the first exon. The transcript variants (e.g. isoforms) 6-12 are all candidates for nonsense-mediated mRNA decay (NMD).

Isoform 4 of the gene is 2320 bp and uses an alternate splice site in the first exon and contains an alternate internal exon. Isoform 5 is 6043 bp and contains an alternate internal exon. Isoform 6 is 5272 bp and contains an alternate first exon and an alternate internal exon. Isoform 7 is 5095 bp and contains an alternate first exon. Isoform 8 is 5129 bp and contains an alternate first exon and alternate internal exon. Isoform 9 is 5151 bp and contains an alternate first exon. Isoform 10 is 5354 bp and contains an alternate first exon. Isoform 11 is 5475 bp and contains an alternate first exon and an alternate internal exon. Lastly, isoform 12 5216 is bp and contains an alternate first exon and an alternate internal exon.

== Proteins ==
=== Isoforms ===
There are two different isoforms of the human FAM120AOS gene that encode a protein, isoforms 1 and 2. The uncharacterized protein FAM120AOS isoform 1 is 256 amino acids long and the uncharacterized protein FAM120AOS isoform 2 is 74 amino acids long. Uncharacterized protein FAM120AOS isoform 1 is the longer and more abundant isoform found in humans, and contains protein domain Q5T035. The isoform also has a protein interactant, Q5T035-F120S_HUMAN, and CRISPR reagents and clone products of the protein available.

=== Molecular weight ===
Uncharacterized protein FAM120AOS isoform 1 (protein isoform 1) in humans has a calculated molecular weight of 27.8 kDa. A theoretical value of 11.93 for the isoelectric point of the protein was determined through the use of ExPASy. The basic isoelectric point indicates that protein isoform 1 is primarily basic. Table 1 shows the isoelectric points and molecular weights for all the different orthologs of the human FAM120AOS protein 1 across Primates and Artiodactyla. The isoelectric point of the protein remains within a pH of 10.05-11.93 across all orthologs, indicating that the protein is primarily basic. However, the molecular weight of the FAM120AOS protein seems to vary greatly between orthologs, ranging from values of 8.1 kDa to 17.9 kDa, with a maximum value of 29.8 kDa. Many of the sequences with a lower molecular weight were found to be composed of fewer amino acids than the sequences with larger molecular weights. These length differences could also be attributed to possible different isoforms of the FAM120AOS protein being analyzed.

Table 1: Isoelectric Point and Molecular Weight of FAM120AOS Protein Across Orthologs
**Organism**	**Taxonomic Group**	**Isoelectric Point**	**Molecular Weight (in kDa)**
Homo sapiens	Primates	11.93	27.9
Pan troglodytes	Primates	11.92	27.7
Pongo abelii	Primates	11.69	27.8
Nomascus leucogenys	Primates	10.32	7.9
Hylobates moloch	Primates	10.06	8.1
Trachypithecus francoisi	Primates	11.35	8.1
Rhinopithecus roxellana	Primates	11.57	8.3
Macaca nemestrina	Primates	11.35	8.1
Papio anubis	Primates	10.98	8.2
Carlito syrichta	Primates	11.36	25.8
Microcebus murinus	Primates	11.52	29.8
Muntiacus muntjak	Artiodactyla	11.21	17.9

==== Amino acid composition ====
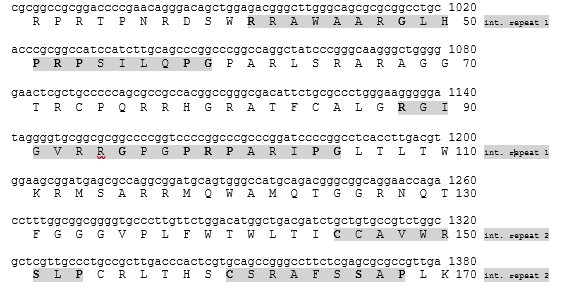
The image above shows the two areas of internal repeats identified in uncharacterized protein FAM120AOS isoform 1. The first internal repeat occurs at amino acid positions 41-59 and 88–105. The second internal repeat occurs at amino acid positions 145-153 and 160–168. The bolded amino acids indicate the repeated areas of the sequences.

Protein isoform 1 contains two different internal repeats in its amino acid composition, determined through analysis of the protein sequence using Dotlet JS. The first internal repeat occurs at amino acid positions 41-59 and 88–105. The second internal repeat occurs at amino acid positions 145-153 and 160–168. There is an upstream in-frame stop codon (taa) present at amino acid positions 806–808. There is an alternate polyadenylation site present at amino acid positions 2726–2731. The polyadenylation signal used is present from amino acid positions 5889–5893. The amino acid positions from L206-S211, H213, H215, K219-P225, and K227-C233 were found to be conserved across all of the strict orthologs of the human uncharacterized protein FAM120AOS isoform 1. The amino acid G95 was found to be conserved across all Primates and Artiodactyla for which sequences were identified. The human FAM120AOS protein 1 was found to arginine-rich, and glutamic acid and tyrosine-poor.

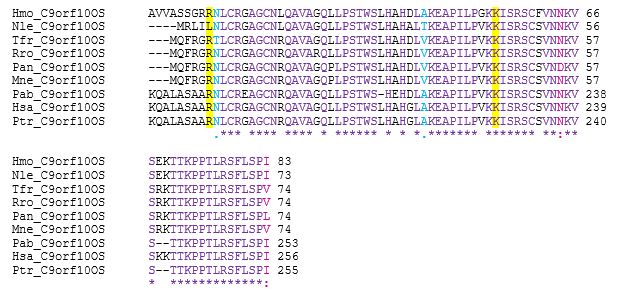
The image above shows the amino acids that are conserved across human uncharacterized FAM120AOS protein isoform 1 and 8 of its strict orthologs. The purple-colored amino acids are fully conserved, while the pink ones are moderately conserved, and the blue ones are slightly conserved. The highlighted areas represent the exon boundaries of the protein. It appears that a large amount of amino acids coded by exon 2 and 3 of the gene were conserved across the strict orthologs of the protein.

=== Domains and motifs ===
The uncharacterized protein FAM120AOS isoform 1 in humans contains the protein domain Q5T035.

Two notable motifs found using a eukaryotic linear motif analysis for the human FAM120AOS protein 1 are TRG_RT_diArg_1 and TRG_NLS_MonoExtN_4. The TRG_RT_diArg_1 motif is a di Arginine retention/retrieving signal that is present on membrane proteins, where it serves for ER localization. The TRG_NLS_MonoExtN_4 is a NLS classical nuclear localization signal, which is possessed by many nuclear proteins, indicating that the human FAM120AOS protein 1 is a nuclear protein.

=== Secondary structure ===
The secondary structure of the human FAM120AOS protein 1 was predicted by the I-TASSER server and shows 11 alpha helices as follows, in order of position: SER15-TRP18, PRO25-SER27, THR34-TRP40, ALA85-ARG88, LYS111-ALA121, CYS145-ARG155, HIS158-ALA163, LEU169-LYS171, PRO179-ARG198, PRO225-CYS233, and PRO246-PHE252.

=== Tertiary and quaternary structure ===
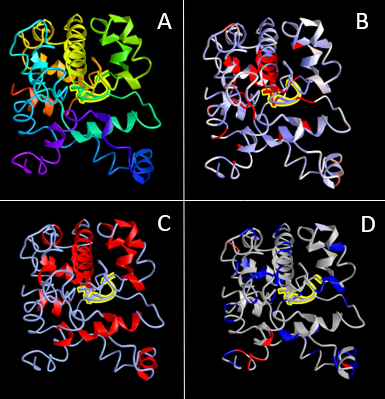
The figure above depicts the iTasser predicted tertiary structure of the human FAM120AOS protein 1. Section A of the figure depicts the predicted tertiary structure, with a possible transmembrane domain highlighted. The purple end sticking out on the bottom left is the start of the coding region (e.g. the methionine), while the red end sticking out towards the left is the end of the strand. The image appears to have 11 alpha helices, represented by the thicker coiled domains. Section B of the figure depicts the predicted tertiary structure of the protein by 35% solvent accessible surface area, which appears white. Section C of the protein shows the secondary structure of the protein, with the alpha helices clearly shown in red. Section D of the protein shows the protein's charge distribution.

The tertiary structure of the human FAM120AOS protein 1 was predicted by the I-TASSER server with a C-score of -4.00. It appears that the outermost parts of the protein are more solvent accessible, while the inner areas are less solvent accessible. The protein appears to be primarily blue, again indicating that it is a basic structure. The protein also indicated the presence of a peripheral likelihood of 1.48 at amino acid position 132. The NUCDISC results indicated the presence of pat 7 PLKKTKS (4) starting at amino acid position 168.

== Gene regulation ==
=== Promoter ===
There are four different promoters for the human FAM120AOS protein 1, which are depicted in the table below. The promoter used for further analysis below (GXP_1829163) is 1665 base pairs long from coordinates 93450944–93452608, with five coding transcripts.

Table 2: Human FAM120A Protein 1 Promoters
Promoter	Size (in base pairs)	Coordinates	Strand	Coding Transcripts
GXP_9004065	1040	93437082-93438121	-	None (non-coding only)
GXP_228179	1040	93446357-93447396	-	None (non-coding only)
GXP_1829163	1665	93450944-93452608	-	5
GXP_2255852	1487	93453115-93454601	-	2

=== Transcription factor binding sites ===
The transcription factors described below were identified on the Human FAM120A protein 1 promoter.

Table 3: Transcription Factors for Human FAM120A Protein 1 Promoter
Code Name	Full Name	Binding	Matrix Score	Start site	End site
AP2F	Activator protein 2	agcGCCAgacggcac	0.862	336	350
STEM	Motif composed of binding sites for pluripotency or stem cell factors	cccgtctGCATggcccact	0.912	255	273
ZF20	C2H2 Zinc finger transcription factors 20	tgcggttACCA	0.791	447	457
E2FF	E2F-myc activator/cell cycle regulator	tggacacggGATAatgg	0.754	29	45
ZF5F	ZF5 POZ domain zinc finger	ccctgaGCGCcccaggc	0.957	28	44
P53F	P53 tumor suppressor	tgcggttaccaaaggCAAGtcagtg	0.954	312	336
RXRF	RXR heterodimer binding sites	ttattgacctagGGTCatattatag	0.857	156	180
EBOX	E-box binding factors	attatccCGTGtccaga	0.901	466	482
ZF02	C2H2 Zinc finger transcription factors 2	caaaagcaCCCCcctacacccgc	0.933	91	113
AP1R	MAF and AP1 related factors	ttggttGCTGagaaatttctagtag	0.842	356	380
PLAG	pleomorphic adenoma gene	taggGGGGtgcttttgctttcct	0.871	114	136
KLFS	Krueppel like transcription factors	agagcttAAAGgattcttc	0.976	118	136
ETSF	Human and murine ETS1 factors	ttcagtgaGGAAagcaaaagc	0.933	196	216

=== Expression pattern ===
An immunohistochemical staining of the FAM120AOS protein in the human prostate using a FAM120AOS polyclonal antibody indicates the presence of FAM120AOS in the nucleus of glandular cells.

In Homo sapiens (humans), the gene exhibits high levels of expression (in RPKM) in the colon, fat, placenta, prostate, and thyroid, as determined through quantitative transcriptomic analysis (RNA-Seq) with the following respective values: 12.598, 11.727, 10.978, 11.277, and 13.511. During human fetal development, the gene exhibits the highest levels of expression in the intestine at 20 weeks and the lungs at 17 weeks, as determined through the use of circular RNA with the following respective mean RPKM values: 5.066 and 4.365. The sequencing of RNA from 20 human tissues showed the highest levels of FAM120AOS expression in the placenta, prostate, and thyroid, with respective mean RPKM values of 7.057, 3.978, and 4.396. Transcription profiling through high throughput sequencing of both individual and mixtures of 16 human tissues RNA also found high levels of FAM120AOS gene expression in the thyroid, with a mean RPKM of 9.518.

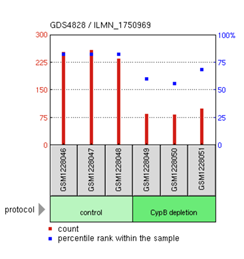
The image above shows the expression pattern for the human FAM120AOS protein in a glioblastoma cell in regards to cyclophilin B (CypB) across 6 samples. In the control group, the expression of FAM120AOS is high, with values in the 83rd percentile. However, in the CypB depletion experimental group, the expression of FAM120AOS is much lower at the 56th, 60th, and 69th percentiles. Therefore, FAM120AOS expression appears to be positively affected by the present of CypB in this glioblastoma multiforme cell line.

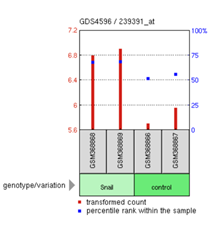
The image above shows the expression pattern for human FAM120AOS in colorectal cancer line SW480 in genotypes with and without SNAI1 overexpression across 4 samples. In the cancer cell line with SNAI1 overexpression, there is a moderate amount of FAM120AOS expression at the 68th and 69th percentiles. In the control group, expression drops to the 52nd and 56th percentile. Therefore SNAI1 overexpression may be linked to FAM120AOS expression, possibly due to its function as a zinc finger protein.

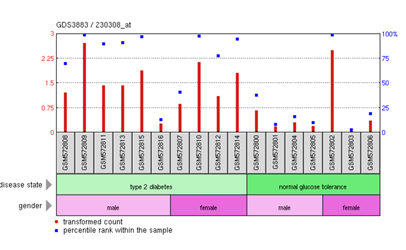
The image above shows the expression pattern for FAM120AOS in human females and males both with and without type 2 diabetes. For the males and females with normal glucose tolerance, there seems to be a relatively lower percentile of FAM120AOS expression, with one outlier that may be due to other underlying conditions. For males and females with type 2 diabetes, FAM120AOS gene expression is generally expressed at the 90th percentiles, while those with normal glucose tolerance generally have expression at the 10th percentile. Women with type 2 diabetes generally have FAM120AOS expression ranging from the 40th-98th percentile, while women with normal glucose tolerance generally have expression at the 10th percentile.

== Transcript level regulation ==
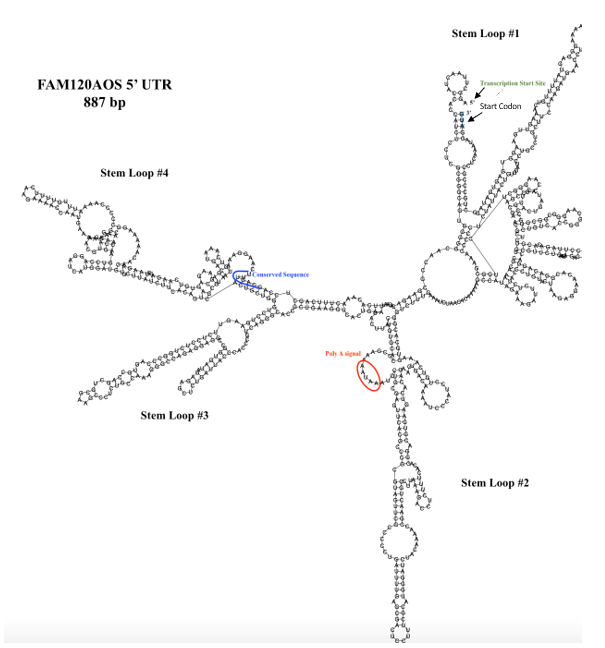
The image above shows the presence of 4 stem loops on the 5' UTR of human FAM120AOS protein 1, along with the transcription start site, start codon, upstream (unused) polyadenylation signal and an area of conserved sequence across the human sequence and its strict orthologs.

There are 4 large stem loops present in the 5' UTR of the human FAM120AOS protein 1. There are 8 miRNA binding sites identified for the human FAM120AOS protein 1.

Table 4: 3' UTR MicroRNA Binding Sites for Human FAM120AOS Protein 1
miRNA Name	miRNA sequence	Target Score	Seed Location
has-miR-4286	ACCCCACUCCUGGUACC	94	475
has-miR-3059-5p	UUUCCUCUCUGCCCCAUAGGGUGU	88	199, 396
has-miR-3152	UGUGUUAGAAUAGGGGCAAUAA	87	173,735
has-miR-4499	AAGACUGAGAGGAGGGA	83	730
has-miR-129-2-3p	AAGCCCUUACCCCAAAAAGCAU	83	1022
has-miR-129-1-3p	AAGCCCUUACCCCAAAAAGUAU	83	1022
has-miR-6881-3p	AUCCUCUUUCGUCCUUCCCACU	82	199, 395
has-miR-10400-3p	CUGGGCUCCCGGACGAGGCGGG	81	337

== Protein level regulation ==
The K-NN prediction results for the human FAM120AOS protein 1 predicted it to be present in the nucleus of cells. There is a possible transmembrane domain for the protein, present from amino acid position 131–148.

The image above shows the predicted transmembrane domain for the human FAM120AOS protein 1.

== Homology/evolution ==
There were no paralogs identified for human FAM120AOS. The most distant homolog for human FAM120AOS detectable is the Microcebus murinus, with a 61.17% sequence identity to the human protein. There was a total of 11 orthologs identified for human FAM120AOS protein 1. No proteins with homologous domains to the human FAM120AOS sequence were identified. FAM120AOS seems to be evolving at a moderate rate, in between that of cytochrome c and fibrinogen alpha.

Table 5: Orthologs of Human FAM120AOS Isoform 1
Genus and species	Common Name	Taxonomic group	Date of divergence (in MYA)	Accession number	Sequence length (in aa)	Sequence Identity to human protein	Sequence similarity to human protein
Homo sapiens	Human	Primates	0	NP_942138.2	256	100.00%	100%
Pan troglodytes	Chimpanzee	Primates	6.4	PNI17265.1	255	98.44%	100%
Pongo abelii	Sumtran orangutan	Primates	15.2	PNJ71424.1	253	95.70%	100%
Nomascus leucogenys	Northern white-cheeked gibbon	Primates	19.8	XP_030657822.1	73	94.12%	26%
Hylobates moloch	Silvery gibbon	Primates	19.8	XP_032020454.1	86	92.65%	26%
Trachypithecus francoisi	Francois' leaf monkey	Primates	28.81	XP_033092605.1	74	92.75%	26%
Rhinopithecus roxellana	Golden snub-nosed monkey	Primates	28.81	XP_030775307.1	74	92.75%	26%
Macaca nemestrina	Southern pit-tailed macaque	Primates	28.81	XP_024642522.1	74	92.75%	26%
Papio anubis	Olive baboon	Primates	28.81	XP_003912044.1	74	92.30%	26%
Carlito syrichta	Philippine tarsier	Primates	69	XP_021572479.1	236	66.82%	78%
Microcebus murinus	Mouse lemur	Primates	74.1	XP_020144792	274	61.17%	76%
Muntiacus muntjak	Indian muntjac	Artiodactyla	94	KAB0347543.1	161	97.18%	27%

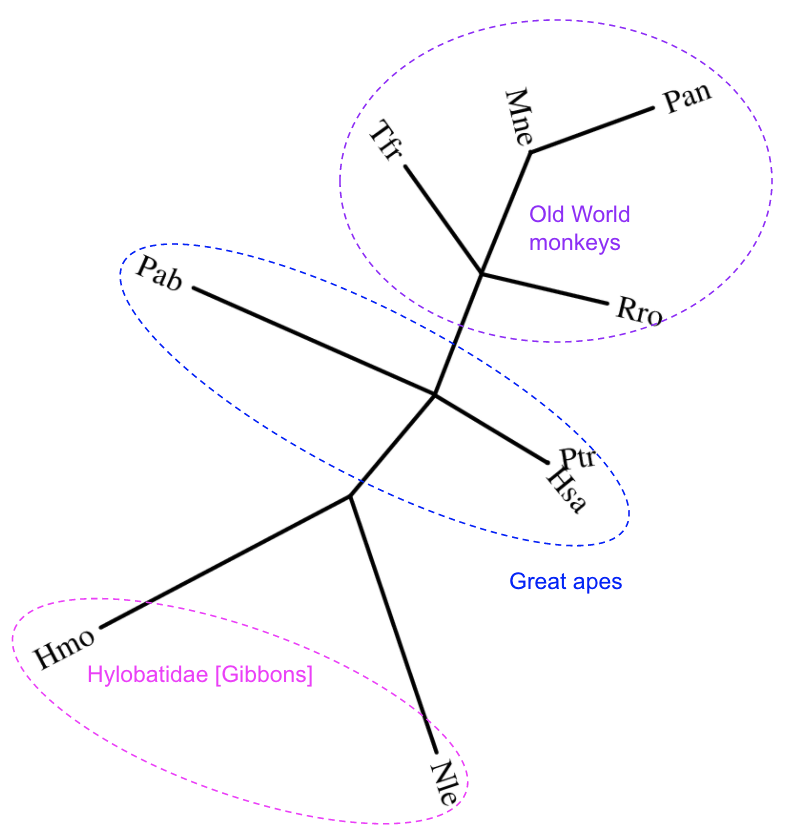
The time calibrated unrooted phylogenetic tree above shows the phylogeny of the FAM120AOS gene across its strict orthologs. The gene seems to have first appeared between a common ancestor of Homo sapiens (humans) and Microcebus murinus (mouse lemur), which diverged from one another approximately 74.1 million years ago (MYA).

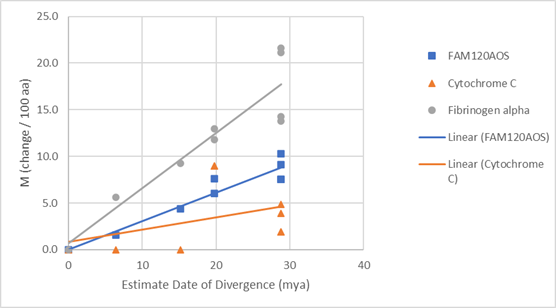
The approximate date of divergence (from human) for a given species versus corrected divergence for FAM120AOS isoform 1, cytochrome c, and fibrinogen alpha across all identified orthologs.

== Function/biochemistry ==
The function and biochemistry of the human FAM120AOS protein are currently unknown. The single nucleotide polymorphisms (SNPs) did not show any mutations in conserved amino acids, so it is lis likely that two copies of the FAM120AOS gene are necessary for proper function.

== Interacting proteins ==
The FAM120AOS protein is physically associated with the following proteins: MDFI, ELAV1, TRIM25, and APEX1.

== Clinical significance ==
A missense mutation in the FAM120AOS protein from amino acid threonine at position 248 to isoleucine (T248I) has been linked in one whole-of-exome sequencing study to: coarse facial features, scoliosis, pectus excavatum, skin laxity, hypotonia, GERD, hyperreactive airway disease, (Note: Elsewhere, Alazami et al. narrow the description of the reported "chronic lung disease" of this participant to "hyperactive airways" instead. This alternative designation appears in the Supplemental Information of the article. In the main body of the article (at Table 2, pp. 156–157), the phenotype of the individual possessing the candidate gene mutation includes "chronic lung disease". However, chronic lung—or chronic respiratory diseases—are specified by various authorities as particular diseases or conditions, and do not include "hyperactive airways". According to the Open Targets Platform, the thoracic societies of the United States (ATS) and Britain (BTS) list chronic lung disease as: fibrosis, bronchiectasis, bullae, emphysema, and nodular or lymphomatous abnormalities. The Australian Institute of Health and Welfare gives asthma, COPD, allergic rhinitis, bronchiectasis, chronic sinusitis, cystic fibrosis, occupational lung diseases, and pulmonary fibrosis as chronic respiratory conditions.) and undescended testicles.

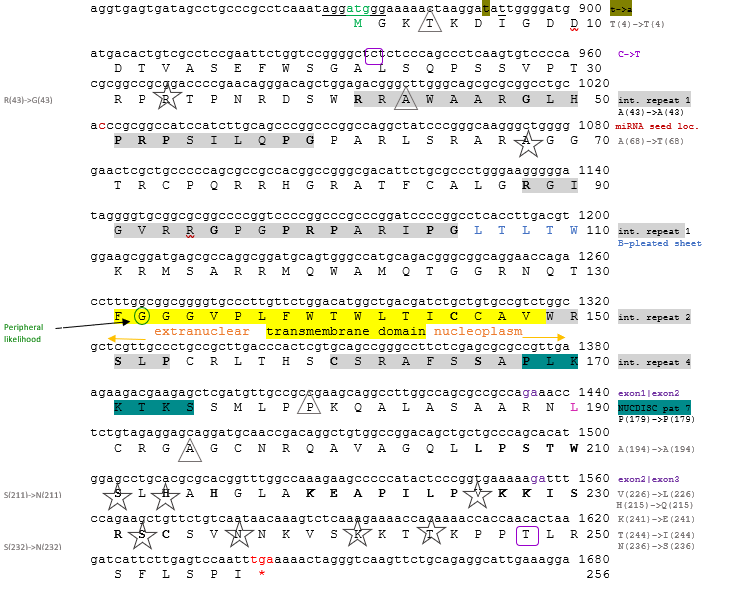
The image above shows the SNPs for human FAM120AOS isoform 1, with stars representing significant missense mutations and triangles representing significant point mutations.
