= Babul Rahmah =

- District
- Interactive map of Babul Rahmah
- Location of Babul Rahmah in Aceh
- Coordinates: 3°19′24.2″N 97°53′37.0″E
- Country: Indonesia
- Province: Aceh
- Regency: Southeast Aceh
- District seat: Lawe Sumur

Area
  - Total: 850.28 km^{2} (328.29 sq mi)

Population (2023)
  - Total: 11.489
  - Density: 0.013512/km^{2} (0.034996/sq mi)
- Time zone: UTC+7 (WIB)
- Villages: 27

Babul Rahmah is a district in Southeast Aceh Regency, Aceh, Indonesia. In 2023, this district had a population of 11.489 people with an area of 850.28 km^{2}.

== Governance ==
=== Villages ===
Administratively, Babul Rahmah District consists of 27 villages (kute), namely:

Regional code	Name	Population (2023)	Hamlets (dusun)
11.02.11.2004	Titi Mas	512	3
11.02.11.2005	Meranti	220	2
11.02.11.2006	Kute Lang-Lang	639	3
11.02.11.2007	Lawe Sumur	577	2
11.02.11.2008	Pardamaian	230	2
11.02.11.2009	Salim Pipit	601	3
11.02.11.2010	Penguhapan	336	2
11.02.11.2011	Lumban Tua	494	3
11.02.11.2012	Mutiara Damai	436	3
11.02.11.2013	Dolok Nauli	269	3
11.02.11.2014	Tuhi Jongkat	350	2
11.02.11.2015	Uning Sigugur	639	3
11.02.11.2016	Lumban Sitio-tio	336	2
11.02.11.2017	Lawe Malum	920	3
11.02.11.2018	Alur Baning	491	2
11.02.11.2019	Lingga Alas	359	2
11.02.11.2020	Khambung Tumbung	505	3
11.02.11.2021	Tuah Mesade	345	3
11.02.11.2022	Sumukh Alas	700	3
11.02.11.2023	Alukh Bakhu	230	2
11.02.11.2024	Sepekhinding	274	2
11.02.11.2025	Tanoh Subukh	174	3
11.02.11.2026	Pinggan Mbelang	493	3
11.02.11.2027	Sigai Indah	307	3
11.02.11.2028	Ukekh Deleng	268	3
11.02.11.2029	Alas Mesikhat	301	2
11.02.11.2030	Titi Hakhapen	483	3
11.02.11	Total	11,489	70
