= Sumatran Orangutan Conservation Programme =

- Formation: 1999
- Type: NGO
- Purpose: Sumatran orangutan conservation
- Headquarters: Medan, Indonesia
- Region served: North Sumatra, Aceh, Jambi, Indonesia
- Conservation Director: Dr. Ian Singleton
- Website: www.sumatranorangutan.org

The Sumatran Orangutan Conservation Programme (SOCP) is a collaborative project involving Indonesian NGO Yayasan Ekosistem Lestari (YEL) - as the main implementer in Indonesia, its Swiss partner the PanEco Foundation, and the Indonesian Ministry of Environment and Forestry's Directorate General of Natural Resource and Ecosystem Conservation (Ditjen KSDAE), under several Memoranda of Understanding (MoU) starting in 1999.

The SOCP deals with all aspects of the conservation of the Critically Endangered Sumatran orangutan (Pongo abelii) and the 2017 newly identified species of orangutan, the Tapanuli orangutan (Pongo tapanuliensis), including: a. the confiscation of illegal captive orangutans, their quarantine and reintroduction to form new wild populations, b. education and awareness raising, c. behavioral and ecological research on wild orangutans, d. surveys and monitoring of remaining wild orangutan populations and habitat, and e. habitat protection.

== Activities ==
Built in 2001, the SOCP maintains the only centre in Sumatra that quarantines and cares for orangutans confiscated from the illegal pet trade. To date, the SOCP has rescued over 340 illegal pet orangutans of which more than 260 have been rehabilitated and reintroduced back to a life in the wild, 180 at its reintroduction centre next to the Bukit Tigapuluh National Park in Jambi province and an additional 88 since 2011 at its centre in the Jantho Pine Forest Nature Reserve in Aceh province. The goal at both locations is to establish entirely new, self-sustaining and genetically viable populations of this Critically Endangered species in forests within their historical range, as a 'safety net' should catastrophe befall the remaining truly wild Sumatran orangutan populations.

== Field conservation ==
The SOCP also manages several other field conservation projects across the entire species' range, with much of its work focused on the naturally remaining wild populations in the 2.6 million ha Leuser Ecosystem, and the largest natural orangutan population outside of the Leuser Ecosystem, the Tapanuli orangutans of the upland forests of the Batang Toru area in the Tapanuli region of North Sumatra. The SOCP is the number one source of data, knowledge and information regarding the conservation status of the species, reflected by its leading role in the 2012 island-wide orangutan survey initiative, the Orangutan Population Habitat and Viability Analysis process, the development of the Indonesian National Strategy and Action Plan for Orangutans 2007-17, its representation on a number of international scientific bodies (e.g. IUCN/SSC Primate Specialist Group - Great Apes, UNEP GRASP), along with numerous scientific publications and popular print and film media items. The SOCP also has many years' experience of community development and livelihoods programmes throughout the region, including humanitarian, health and sanitation projects, ecotourism development.
