= Southeast Aceh Regency =

Regency in Aceh, Indonesia

Southeast Aceh Regency Kabupaten Aceh Tenggara
- Regency
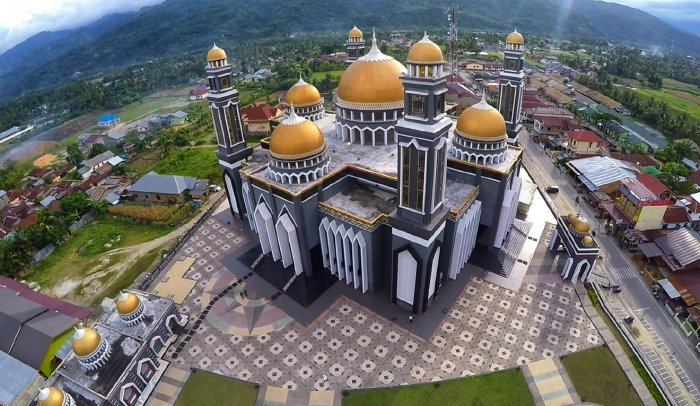
- Great mosque of Aceh Tenggara in Kutacane

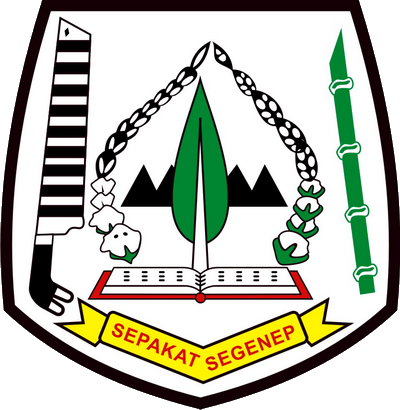
- Seal
- Motto: Sepakat Segenep (One Word for Unity)
- Location within Aceh

- Location in Aceh, Northern Sumatra, Sumatra and Indonesia Southeast Aceh Regency (Northern Sumatra) Southeast Aceh Regency (Sumatra) Southeast Aceh Regency (Indonesia)
- Coordinates: 3°22′N 97°41′E
- Country: Indonesia
- Region: Sumatra
- Province: Aceh
- Established: 26 June 1974
- Regency seat: Kutacane

Government
  - Regent: Muhammad Salim Fakhry
  - Vice Regent: Heri Al Hilal

Area
  - Total: 4,179.12 km^{2} (1,613.57 sq mi)

Population (mid 2025 estimate)
  - Total: 237,910
  - Density: 56.928/km^{2} (147.44/sq mi)
- Time zone: UTC+7 (IWST)
- Area code: (+62) 629
- Vehicle registration: BL
- Website: acehtenggarakab.go.id

Southeast Aceh Regency (Indonesian: Kabupaten Aceh Tenggara) is a regency in the Aceh province of Indonesia. It is located on the island of Sumatra. In 1974, the Southeast Aceh Regency was created by being separated from the Central Aceh Regency; however in 2002 the northern part of this regency was itself split away to form the new Gayo Lues Regency. The regency now covers an area of 4,179.12 square kilometres and had a population of 179,010 at the 2010 census and 220,860 at the 2020 Census; the official estimate as of mid 2025 was 237,910 (comprising 119,721 males and 118,189 females). The seat of the regency government is at the town of Kutacane (in Babussalam district).

The main commodities produced in the regency are palm oil, cacao, coconut, coffee, nutmeg, walnut, and pachouli oil The main rivers are the Alas River and the Butan River. It contains the Leuser Ecosystem.

== Ethnic groups ==
The original inhabitants of Southeast Aceh Regency are the Alas people. They use the Alas language and live under the customs (adat) of those people. However, the population of the Southeast Aceh Regency has become very diverse due to migration from other regencies of Aceh and beyond. Although this Regency is part of Aceh province, the Acehnese people (an eastern coastal grouping) do not dominate this place.

Here are some other peoples other than Alas inhabiting the regency:

- Gayo people, the majority of whom live in Bambel district.
- Karo people in Babul Makmur, Lawe Sigala-Gala, Semadam, and Babussalam districts.
- Java Islanders (Javanese and Sundanese peoples) in Badar and Babussalam districts.
- Minangkabau people in Babussalam district (in the town of Kutacane).
- Singkil people in Bambel district.
- Acehnese people, mainly in Babussalam district (in the town of Kutacane).

There are other smaller ethnic groups that are still new to the Regency and do not constitute a majority population elsewhere, such as Tamiang Malays.

== Administrative borders ==
The regency is bordered by the following regencies:

Direction	Neighbour
North	Gayo Lues Regency
East	Karo, Dairi and Langkat Regencies of North Sumatra
West	South Aceh Regency
South	South Aceh Regency and Subulussalam City

== Administrative districts ==
The regency is divided administratively into sixteen districts (kecamatan), listed below with their areas and their populations at the 2010 Census and the 2020 Census, together with the official estimates as of mid 2024. The densest populations are found in the eastern districts, along the borders with North Sumatra province. The table also includes the locations of the district administrative centres, the number of villages (gampong) in each district, and its post codes.

Kode Wilayah	Name of District (kecamatan)	Area in km^{2}	Pop'n Census 2010	Pop'n Census 2020	Pop'n Estimate mid 2024	Admin centre	No. of villages	Post code
11.02.01	Lawe Alas	564.39	13,010	16,584	18,668	Ngkeran	28	24661
11.02.11	Babul Rahmah	376.88	7,439	9,170	10,580	Lawe Sumur	27	24675
11.02.15	Tanoh Alas	170.44	3,606	4,789	5,442	Tenembak Alas	14	24674
11.02.02	Lawe Sigala-gala	75.37	17,429	20,751	21,578	Lawe Sigala	35	24676
11.02.06	Babul Makmur	73.61	12,580	15,101	15,510	Cinta Makmur	21	24673
11.02.10	Semadam	37.94	10,702	13,249	13,784	Simpang Semadam	19	24678
11.02.16	Leuser	1,389.60	4,876	6,998	7,606	Kane Mende	23	24677
11.02.03	Bambel	26.77	15,090	19,219	20,678	Kuta Lang Lang	33	24672
11.02.09	Bukit Tusam	37.19	8,685	11,479	12,886	Lawe Dua	23	24671
11.02.14	Lawe Sumur	36.14	6,696	7,686	9,124	Lawe Perlak	18	24670
11.02.04	Babussalam	114.30	24,785	29,676	29,185	Kutacane	27	24664
11.02.08	Lawe Bulan	39.62	13,426	17,039	16,932	Simpang Empat	24	24665
11.02.05	Badar	107.28	12,119	14,512	14,964	Purwodadi	18	24666
11.02.07	Darul Hasanah	381.57	11,488	14,974	16,323	Mamas	28	24663
11.02.12	Ketambe	690.53	9,273	10,890	12,766	Lawe Beringin	25	24662
11.02.13	Deleng Pokhkisen	57.49	7,045	8,743	9,563	Beringin Naru	22	24660
	Totals	4,179.12	179,010	220,860	235,589	Kutacane	385	

== Regents ==
No.	Name	Period
1.	Lettu. H. Syahadat	1975-1981
2.	T. Djohan Syahbudin, SH	1981-1986
3.	Drs. H. T. Iskandar	1986-1991
4.	Drs. Syahbudin BP	1991-2001
5.	H. Armen Desky	2001-2006
6.	Ir. H. Hasanuddin Beruh, MM	2006-2017
7.	Drs. H. Raidin Pinim, M.AP	2017-now

== See also ==
- List of regencies and cities of Indonesia
- Kutacane
- Alas people
