= Semadam =

District in Aceh, Indonesia

- District
- Interactive map of Semadam
- Coordinates: 3°23′29.4133″N 97°53′3.8112″E
- Country: Indonesia
- Province: Aceh
- Regency: Southeast Aceh

Area
  - Total: 42.98 km^{2} (16.59 sq mi)

Population (2020)
  - Total: 13,249
  - Density: 308.3/km^{2} (798.4/sq mi)
- Time zone: UTC+7 (WIB)
- Postal code: 24678
- Regional code: 11.02.10
- Villages: 19

Semadam is a district (kecamatan) in Southeast Aceh Regency, Aceh, Indonesia. According to the 2020 census, it has a population of 13,249 people.

== Geography ==
=== Villages ===
Semadam district consists of 18 villages (desa), namely:

- Kampung Baru
- Kebun Sere
- Lawe Beringin Gayo
- Lawe Beringin Horas
- Lawe Kinga Gabungan
- Lawe Kinga Tebing Tinggi
- Lawe Mejile
- Lawe Petanduk
- Lawe Petanduk I
- Ngkeran Alur Buluh
- Pasar Puntung
- Selamat Indah
- Semadam Asal
- Semadam Awal
- Sepakat Segenep
- Simpang Semadam
- Suka Makmur
- Titi Pasir

=== Climate ===
Climate data for Semadam (Meteorology, Climatology, and Geophysical Agency)
Month	Jan	Feb	Mar	Apr	May	Jun	Jul	Aug	Sep	Oct	Nov	Dec	Year
Mean daily maximum °C (°F)	30 (86)	30 (86)	32 (90)	30 (86)	29 (84)	31 (88)	31 (88)	31 (88)	30 (86)	30 (86)	30 (86)	30 (86)	30 (87)
Mean daily minimum °C (°F)	18 (64)	20 (68)	20 (68)	19 (66)	20 (68)	21 (70)	21 (70)	21 (70)	20 (68)	20 (68)	20 (68)	20 (68)	20 (68)
Average precipitation mm (inches)	150 (5.9)	120 (4.7)	130 (5.1)	140 (5.5)	160 (6.3)	170 (6.7)	180 (7.1)	190 (7.5)	200 (7.9)	210 (8.3)	220 (8.7)	230 (9.1)	2,100 (82.8)
Source: BMKG (Note: This data is an estimate from BMKG's forecast and may change according to the latest weather conditions)
