= Bukit Tigapuluh National Park =

National park in Sumatra

- IUCN category II (national park)
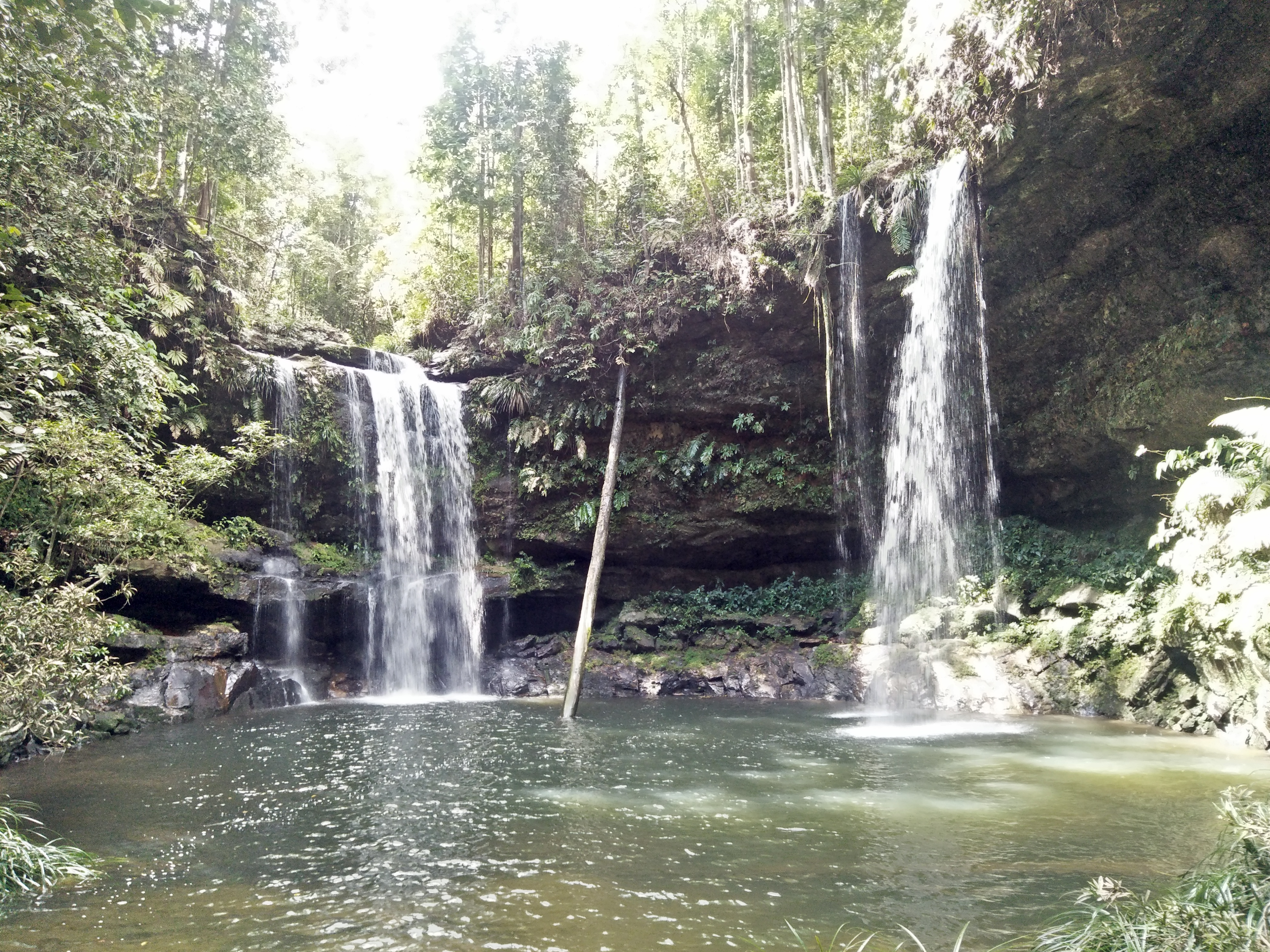
- Kembar Denalo Waterfall, Bukit Tigapuluh NP

- Location within Sumatra Location within Indonesia
- Location: Sumatra, Indonesia
- Coordinates: 1°0′S 102°30′E
- Area: 143,223 ha (353,910 acres)
- Established: 1995
- Governing body: Ministry of Forestry

Bukit Tigapuluh National Park (also called Bukit Tiga Puluh and Bukit Tigapulah) - The Thirty Hills - is a 143,223-hectare National Park in eastern Sumatra, consisting primarily of tropical lowland forest, largely in Riau province, with a smaller part of 33,000 ha in Jambi province. It is famous as one of the last refuges of endangered species such as the Sumatran orangutan, Sumatran tiger, Sumatran elephant, and Asian tapir, as well as many endangered bird species. It forms part of the Tesso Nilo Complex biodiversity hotspot. The Park is inhabited by the indigenous peoples of the Orang Rimba and Talang Mamak tribes.

The Park itself has been under consistent threat from illegal logging and palm oil plantations, with two-thirds of the park logged.

== Flora and fauna ==
Ecosystem types within the Park include lowland and highland forests, with flora such as Gutta-percha, Shorea, Alstonia scholaris, Dyera costulata, Koompassia excelsa, Rafflesia hasseltii, Calamus draco, and various other kinds of rattan.

According to a 1994 survey, Bukit Tigapuluh National Park has 59 species of mammal, including six species of primate and 18 species of bat, in addition to 198 species of bird and various species of butterfly. Mammals include Sumatran orangutan, Sumatran tiger, Sumatran elephant, Asian tapir, sun bear, siamang, crab-eating macaque, Sumatran surili, Sunda loris, clouded leopard, leopard cat, marbled cat, dhole, Malayan civet, Indian muntjac, Sumatran serow and Java mouse-deer.

Bird species include great argus, little green-pigeon, white-rumped shama, white-bellied woodpecker, crested serpent-eagle, Hill myna, helmeted hornbill, wrinkled hornbill, white-winged wood duck, Storm's stork, garnet pitta and grey-breasted babbler.

The Park also has an important role in protecting the hydrology of the Kuantan Indragiri watershed.

== Conservation and threats ==
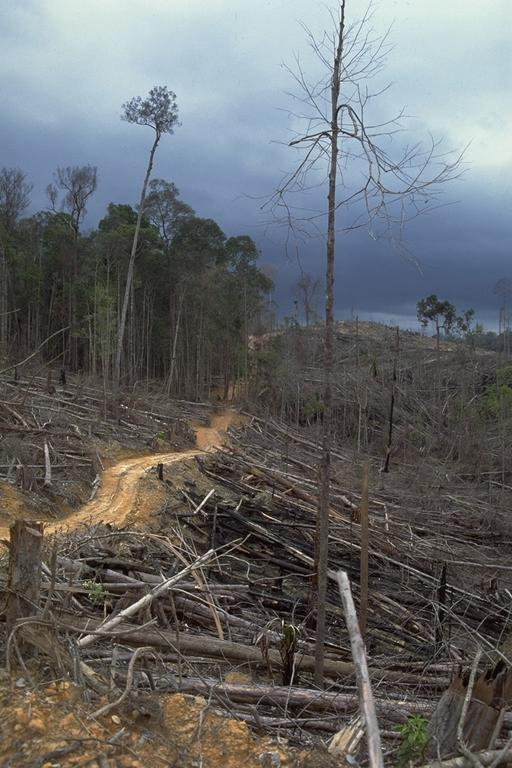
Deforestation for oil palm plantation in the buffer zone of the National Park

In 1982 the National Conservation Plan highlighted the importance of the Bukit Tigapuluh ecosystem and classified the two conservation areas of Bukit Besar Wildlife Sanctuary (200,000 hectares (770 mi^{2})) and Seberida Nature Reserve (120,000 hectares (460 mi^{2})) as priority I conservation areas. In 1992 the Indonesian Government in cooperation with the Norwegian Government conducted research to document the biological value of the Bukit Tigapuluh ecosystem. As the result of research, the Bukit Tigapuluh ecosystem with an area of 250,000 hectares (970 mi^{2}) was recommended to be determined as a national park. In 1995 Bukit Tigapuluh was established as a national park by Ministerial Decree comprising an area of 127,698 hectares (493.04 mi^{2}). In 2002 its area was expanded to 143,223 hectares (552.99 mi^{2}).

The Park has been under consistent threat from illegal logging and palm oil plantations, with two-thirds of the park logged. Surrounding buffer zones and wildlife corridors are diminishing, with 30,000 hectares (120 mi^{2}), the largest area of forest remaining outside the Park, released in May 2009 by the Indonesian government for logging.

=== Orangutan reintroduction ===
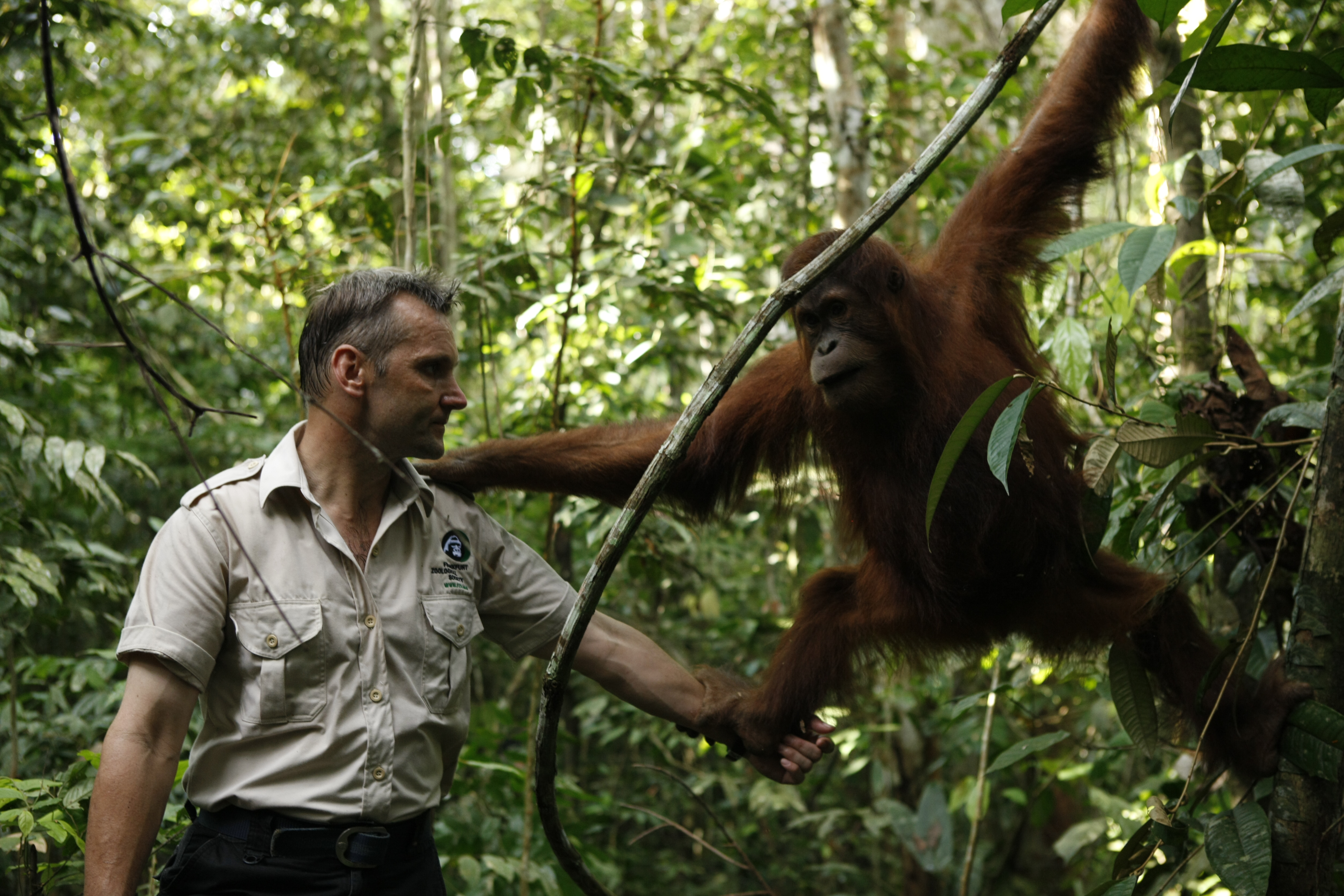
FZS Program Director Peter Pratje working with orangutans in Bukit Tigapuluh, Indonesia.

The orangutan reintroduction in Bukit Tigapuluh National Park is organized by the Sumatran Orangutan Conservation Programme (SOCP).

The first reintroduction station for orangutans close to the park was built in 2001 by the German biologist Dr. Peter Pratje, with the support of the Frankfurt Zoological Society and local partners. It offers a school-like program to train individual orangutans, who grew up in captivity, to survive the wild.

In 2002 the Batu Mbelin orangutan quarantine centre was completed near Medan in North Sumatra, which is operated by PanEco. In December 2002 the first orangutans were transferred from the quarantine centre to the rehabilitation centre near Bukit Tigapuluh National Park and reintroduced shortly after.

Nowadays two orangutan reintroduction stations are operated close to the park's boundaries which focus on reintroducing the animals to the Bukit Tigapuluh National Park.

Since then, over 190 orangutans have been treated at the quarantine centre and over 160 of these have already been transferred to Bukit Tigapuluh for reintroduction under the auspices of the Sumatran Orangutan Conservation Programme. At least 4 infants have also been born to reintroduced mothers, these infants being the first to be conceived and born in the forests of Jambi possibly for more than 100 years.

=== Cats ===
Camera traps set up in the Bukit Tigapuluh forest in March and April 2011 by the World Wildlife Fund (WWF) have taken images of 12 rare Sumatran tigers, including a mother playing with cubs. Subsequently, the organisation intensified its campaign against the planned logging of the area. Although the Indonesian government agreed in 2010 to implement a 2-year moratorium on new forest clearance, the presidential regulation that imposes the moratorium was only signed in May 2011. None of the Bukit Tigapuluh landscape is covered by the moratorium and Asia Pulp & Paper plans to clear large areas of the forest.

In November 2011, the WWF announced five endangered cats in the forests of Riau. Within three months of systematic survey using automatic surveillance cameras at the 'corridor' between the Bukit Tigapuluh National Park and Rimbang Baling Sanctuary, they found Sumatran tiger (Panthera tigris sumatrae), Sunda clouded leopard (Neofelis diardi), marbled cat (Pardofelis marmoata), golden cat (Catopurna temmincki), and leopard cat (Prionailurus bengalensis). The cats pass the same tracks all the time in the corridor, but both areas connected by the corridor are currently threatened by deforestation.
