= Lawe Bulan =

- District
- Interactive map of Lawe Bulan
- Location within Aceh Location within Sumatra Location within Indonesia
- Coordinates: 3°29′33″N 97°49′18″E
- Country: Indonesia
- Region: Sumatra
- Province: Aceh
- Regency: Southeast Aceh
- District seat: Simpang Empat

Area
  - Total: 37.14 km^{2} (14.34 sq mi)

Population (2023)
  - Total: 16,580
  - Density: 446.4/km^{2} (1,156/sq mi)
- Time zone: UTC+7 (WIB)
- Villages: 24

Lawe Bulan is a district in Southeast Aceh Regency, Aceh, Indonesia. In 2023, this district had a population of 16,580 people with an area of 37.14 km^{2}.

== Governance ==
=== Villages ===
Administratively, Lawe Bulan District consists of 24 villages (kute), namely:

Regional code	Name	Population (2023)	Hamlets (dusun)
11.02.08.2001	Pasir Gala	776	3
11.02.08.2002	Pasir Penjengakan	612	4
11.02.08.2003	Kutambaru	1080	4
11.02.08.2004	Lawe Sagu Hulu	645	3
11.02.08.2005	Lawe Sagu Hilir	644	4
11.02.08.2006	Kute Bantil	570	2
11.02.08.2011	Lawe Kolok	525	3
11.02.08.2012	Lawe Rutung	1993	5
11.02.08.2013	Kampung Nangka	565	3
11.02.08.2014	Tenembak Juhar	393	4
11.02.08.2015	Simpang Empat	1023	4
11.02.08.2016	Kuta Buluh Botong	430	3
11.02.08.2017	Katambaru Becawan	757	4
11.02.08.2018	Lawe Kinge	466	3
11.02.08.2019	Kandang Mbelang Mandiri	515	4
11.02.08.2020	Mbacang Racun	397	2
11.02.08.2021	Telaga Mekar	618	3
11.02.08.2023	Pulonas Baru	1262	4
11.02.08.2025	Kuta Genting	455	3
11.02.08.2026	Lawe Sagu Baru	448	4
11.02.08.2027	Lawe Sagu	448	4
11.02.08.2028	East Pekhapet	461	3
11.02.08.2029	Bahagia	432	3
11.02.08.2030	Kute Galuh Asli	761	4
	Total	16,580	83
