= Darul Hasanah =

District of Southeast Aceh, Aceh

- District
- Interactive map of Darul Hasanah
- Coordinates: 3°33′50.1257″N 97°44′49.511″E
- Country: Indonesia
- Province: Aceh
- Regency: Southeast Aceh

Area
  - Total: 1,346.72 km^{2} (519.97 sq mi)

Population (2020)
  - Total: 14.974
  - Density: 0.011119/km^{2} (0.028798/sq mi)
- Time zone: UTC+7 (WIB)
- Postal code: 24663
- Regional code: 11.02.07
- Villages: 28

Darul Hasanah is a district (kecamatan) in Southeast Aceh Regency, Aceh, Indonesia. In 2020, it had a population of 14,974 and covered an area of 1,346.72 km^{2}.

== Geography ==
=== Villages ===
The district of Darul Hasanah is divided into the following villages (desa):

- Buntul Kendawi
- Darul Makmur
- Gulo
- Istiqomah
- Kitei Meranggun
- Khotan Jaya
- Kuning Abadi
- Kute Rambe
- Kute Ujung
- Lawe Mamas Indah
- Lawe Pinis
- Lawe Setul
- Makmur Jaya
- Mamas
- Mamas Baru
- Pulo Gadung
- Pulo Piku
- Rambung Jaya
- Rambung Teldak
- Serimuda
- Simpang Empat Tanjung
- Tanjung Aman
- Tanjung Lama
- Tanjung Leuser
- Tanjung Mbakhu

=== Climate ===
Climate data for Darul Hasanah, Southeast Aceh
Month	Jan	Feb	Mar	Apr	May	Jun	Jul	Aug	Sep	Oct	Nov	Dec	Year
Mean daily maximum °C (°F)	30 (86)	30 (86)	32 (90)	30 (86)	29 (84)	31 (88)	31 (88)	31 (88)	30 (86)	30 (86)	30 (86)	30 (86)	30 (87)
Mean daily minimum °C (°F)	18 (64)	20 (68)	20 (68)	19 (66)	20 (68)	21 (70)	21 (70)	21 (70)	20 (68)	20 (68)	20 (68)	20 (68)	20 (68)
Average precipitation mm (inches)	150 (5.9)	120 (4.7)	130 (5.1)	140 (5.5)	160 (6.3)	170 (6.7)	180 (7.1)	190 (7.5)	200 (7.9)	210 (8.3)	220 (8.7)	230 (9.1)	2,100 (82.8)
Source: BMKG
