= PHF2 =

Protein-coding gene in the species Homo sapiens

Identifiers
- Aliases: PHF2, CENP-35, GRC5, JHDM1E, PHD finger protein 2, KDM7C
- External IDs: OMIM: 604351; MGI: 1338034; GeneCards: PHF2
Available structures
PDB	Ortholog search: PDBe RCSB
PDB	List of PDB id codes 3KQI, 3PTR, 3PU3, 3PU8, 3PUA, 3PUS

Gene location (Human)
Chr.	Chromosome 9 (human)
Band	9q22.31	Start	93,576,584 bp
Band	9q22.31	End	93,679,587 bp

Gene location (Mouse)
Chr.	Chromosome 13 (mouse)
Band	13 A5|13 24.96 cM	Start	48,955,226 bp
Band	13 A5|13 24.96 cM	End	49,024,595 bp
RNA expression pattern
Bgee	Human / Mouse (ortholog); Top expressed in: ganglionic eminence; ventricular zone; right hemisphere of cerebellum; cerebellar vermis; tendon of biceps brachii; internal globus pallidus; body of uterus; anterior pituitary; left ovary; canal of the cervix / Top expressed in: ascending aorta; aortic valve; thymus; genital tubercle; ventricular zone; lacrimal gland; submandibular gland; lumbar subsegment of spinal cord; ganglionic eminence; ureter; More reference expression data
BioGPS	n/a
Gene ontology
Molecular function	iron ion binding; histone H3-methyl-lysine-9 demethylase activity; transcription coactivator activity; dioxygenase activity; metal ion binding; methylated histone binding; protein binding; oxidoreductase activity; histone demethylase activity; zinc ion binding
Cellular component	nucleoplasm; chromosome; nucleolus; chromosome, centromeric region; kinetochore; nucleus
Biological process	regulation of transcription, DNA-templated; histone H3-K9 demethylation; protein demethylation; transcription, DNA-templated; negative regulation of ribosomal DNA heterochromatin assembly; liver development; chromatin organization
Sources:Amigo / QuickGO
Orthologs
Databases	NCBI: entry; OMA: entry
Species	Human	Mouse
Entrez	5253	18676
Ensembl	ENSG00000197724	ENSMUSG00000038025
UniProt	O75151	Q9WTU0
RefSeq (mRNA)	NM_005392; NM_024517	NM_011078
RefSeq (protein)	NP_005383	NP_035208
Location (UCSC)	Chr 9: 93.58 – 93.68 Mb	Chr 13: 48.96 – 49.02 Mb
PubMed search
- Wikidata
View/Edit Human	View/Edit Mouse

PHD finger protein 2 is a protein that in humans is encoded by the PHF2 gene.

== Function ==
This gene encodes a protein which contains a zinc finger-like PHD (plant homeodomain) finger, distinct from other classes of zinc finger motifs, and a hydrophobic and highly conserved domain. The PHD finger shows the typical Cys_{4}-His-Cys_{3} arrangement. PHD finger genes are thought to belong to a diverse group of transcriptional regulators possibly affecting eukaryotic gene expression by influencing chromatin structure.
