= Ketambe =

- District
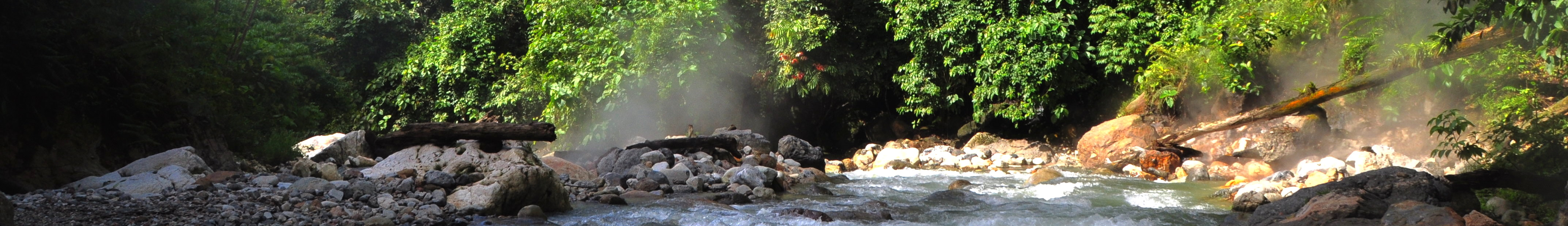
- Hot springs near Ketambe
- Interactive map of Ketambe
- Location of Ketambe in Aceh
- Coordinates: 3°41′32.96″N 97°39′8.55″E
- Country: Indonesia
- Province: Aceh
- Regency: Southeast Aceh
- District seat: Lawe Beringin

Area
  - Total: 255.07 km^{2} (98.48 sq mi)

Population (2020)
  - Total: 10,890
  - Density: 42.69/km^{2} (110.6/sq mi)

Ketambe is a district in Southeast Aceh Regency, Aceh, Indonesia. In 2020, this district had a population of 10,890 people with an area of 255.07 km^{2}.

== Governance ==
=== Kute ===
Administratively, Ketambe District consists of 25 villages (Kute), namely:

Regional code	Name	Population (2023)	Hamlets (dusun)
11.02.12.2001	Aunan Sepakat	451	4
11.02.12.2002	Lawe Penanggalan	623	3
11.02.12.2003	Lawe Mengkudu	376	3
11.02.12.2004	Jambur Lak-lak	488	3
11.02.12.2005	Simpang Tiga Jongar	454	3
11.02.12.2006	Jongar Asli	800	3
11.02.12.2007	Ketambe	628	4
11.02.12.2008	Rumah Bundar	435	3
11.02.12.2009	Penyeberangan Cingkam	484	4
11.02.12.2010	Deleng Damar	533	3
11.02.12.2011	Bintang Bener	552	3
11.02.12.2012	Suka Rimbun	508	3
11.02.12.2013	Lawe Aunan	784	4
11.02.12.2014	Bener Bepapah	380	3
11.02.12.2015	Penungkunen	415	3
11.02.12.2016	Datok Pining	402	3
11.02.12.2017	Kati Maju	388	3
11.02.12.2018	Leuser	900	3
11.02.12.2019	Jati Sara	324	3
11.02.12.2020	Bukit Mbakhu	484	3
11.02.12.2021	Kayu Metangur	396	4
11.02.12.2022	Lawe Sembekan	426	3
11.02.12.2023	Lawe Beringin	454	3
11.02.12.2024	Lawe Ger-Ger	391	3
11.02.12.2025	Simpur Jaya	650	3
11.02.12	Totals	12,726	80
