= BinCARD =

Protein-coding gene in the species Homo sapiens

CARD19

Identifiers
- Aliases: CARD19, BinCARD, bA370F5.1, C9orf89, caspase recruitment domain family member 19
- External IDs: OMIM: 617726; MGI: 1915730; GeneCards: CARD19
Available structures
PDB	Ortholog search: PDBe RCSB
PDB	List of PDB id codes 4DWN, 4FH0

Gene location (Human)
Chr.	Chromosome 9 (human)
Band	9q22.31	Start	93,096,217 bp
Band	9q22.31	End	93,113,283 bp

Gene location (Mouse)
Chr.	Chromosome 13 (mouse)
Band	13|13 A5	Start	49,356,426 bp
Band	13|13 A5	End	49,369,513 bp
RNA expression pattern
Bgee	Human / Mouse (ortholog); Top expressed in: monocyte; granulocyte; right coronary artery; ascending aorta; right hemisphere of cerebellum; tibial arteries; Descending thoracic aorta; olfactory zone of nasal mucosa; left uterine tube; nasal epithelium / Top expressed in: granulocyte; muscle of thigh; lip; digastric muscle; triceps brachii muscle; temporal muscle; sternocleidomastoid muscle; lumbar spinal ganglion; right ventricle; yolk sac; More reference expression data
BioGPS	n/a
Gene ontology
Molecular function	CARD domain binding; protein binding
Cellular component	endoplasmic reticulum membrane; cytosol; nucleus; membrane; integral component of membrane; mitochondrial membranes; endoplasmic reticulum; mitochondrion
Biological process	negative regulation of I-kappaB kinase/NF-kappaB signaling
Sources:Amigo / QuickGO
Orthologs
Databases	NCBI: entry; OMA: entry
Species	Human	Mouse
Entrez	84270	68480
Ensembl	ENSG00000165233	ENSMUSG00000037960
UniProt	Q96LW7	Q9D1I2
RefSeq (mRNA)	NM_032310; NM_001318010; NM_001318011	NM_026738
RefSeq (protein)	NP_001304939; NP_001304940; NP_115686	NP_081014
Location (UCSC)	Chr 9: 93.1 – 93.11 Mb	Chr 13: 49.36 – 49.37 Mb
PubMed search
- Wikidata
View/Edit Human	View/Edit Mouse

Bcl10-interacting CARD protein, also known as BinCARD, is a protein that in humans is encoded by the C9orf89 gene on chromosome 9. BinCARD is a member of the death-domain superfamily and contains a caspase recruitment domain (CARD). This protein regulates apoptosis and the immune response by inhibiting Bcl10, thus implicating it in diseases stemming from Bcl10 dysfunction.

== Structure ==
BinCARD, as a CARD-containing protein, is a member of the death-domain superfamily, which shares a six—helix bundle. In humans, the protein has two alternatively spliced isoforms: BinCARD-1 and BinCARD-2. Both isoforms share identical sequences until residue 101, which include the CARD domain and exons 1 to 3. The longer isoform, BinCARD-1, has an extended exon 3, while the shorter BinCARD-2 has an extra transmembrane domain. The conserved CARD domain has three cysteines in its native form: Cys7, Cys77, and Cys63, of which Cys7 and Cys77 form a disulfide bond and Cys63 becomes a cysteine sulfenic acid when oxidized.

== Function ==
The BinCARD protein is a member of the death-domain superfamily, which is known for regulating apoptosis and the immune response. BinCARD is a negative regulator that binds to, and thus blocks the phosphorylation of, Bcl10, effectively inhibiting Bcl10 from activating the nuclear factor-κB (NF-κB). In particular, the BinCARD-1 isoform contains an extended C-terminal that has been observed to bind Bcl10, though it mostly localizes to the nucleus. The second isoform, BinCARD-2, is more abundantly expressed and localizes to both the ER and the mitochondria. This isoform is expected to contribute to apoptosis via redox processes, as its three modifiable cysteines can be oxidized by reactive oxygen species (ROS) to stimulate an innate immune response.

== Clinical significance ==
Mutations in BinCARD and other proteins containing CARD domains are linked to Bcl10-related diseases, including lymphoma of mucosa-associated lymphoid tissue. Bcl10 has been shown to induce apoptosis and to activate NF-kappaB. This protein is reported to interact with other CARD domain containing proteins including CARD9, 10, 11 and 14, which are thought to function as upstream regulators in NF-kappaB signaling. Accordingly, BinCARD protein has a pivotal role in regulating apoptotic functions.

Because of its important biological and physiological functions, apoptosis is pivotal in many clinical constituents. During normal embryologic processes, or during cell injury (such as ischemia-reperfusion injury during heart attacks and strokes) or during developments and processes in cancer, an apoptotic cell undergoes structural changes including cell shrinkage, plasma membrane blebbing, nuclear condensation, and fragmentation of the DNA and nucleus. This is followed by fragmentation into apoptotic bodies that are quickly removed by phagocytes, thereby preventing an inflammatory response. It is a mode of cell death defined by characteristic morphological, biochemical and molecular changes. It was first described as a "shrinkage necrosis", and then this term was replaced by apoptosis to emphasize its role opposite mitosis in tissue kinetics. In later stages of apoptosis the entire cell becomes fragmented, forming a number of plasma membrane-bounded apoptotic bodies which contain nuclear and or cytoplasmic elements. The ultrastructural appearance of necrosis is quite different, the main features being mitochondrial swelling, plasma membrane breakdown and cellular disintegration. Apoptosis occurs in many physiological and pathological processes. It plays an important role during embryonal development as programmed cell death and accompanies a variety of normal involutional processes in which it serves as a mechanism to remove "unwanted" cells.

BinCARD has reportedly suppressed NF-kappa B activation induced by BCL10 hereby decreasing the amounts of phosphorylated Bcl10. Subsequently, mutations at the residue Leu17 or Leu65, which is highly conserved in CARD, abolished the inhibitory effects of BinCARD on both Bcl10-induced activation of NF-kappa B and phosphorylation of Bcl10. Further, expression of BinCARD inhibited Bcl10 phosphorylation induced by T cell activation signal. These results suggest that BinCARD interacts with Bcl10 to inhibit Bcl10-mediated activation of NF-kappa B and to suppress Bcl10 phosphorylation. Accordingly, these processes regulating apoptosis during clinical processes such as cancer and ischemia-reperfusion injury.

== Interactions ==
BinCARD has been shown to interact with:

- Bcl10
