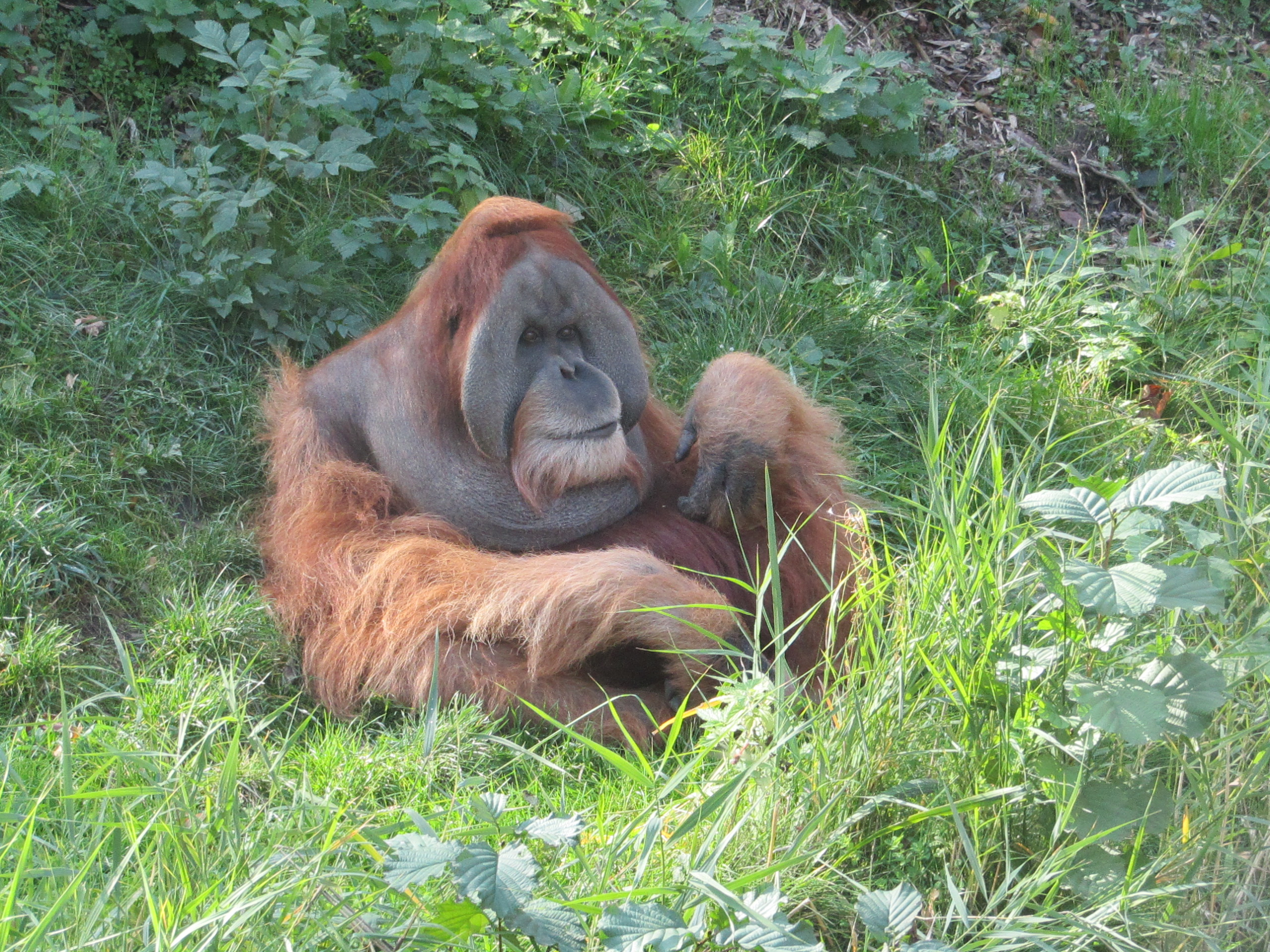
- Male at Leipzig Zoological Garden, Leipzig
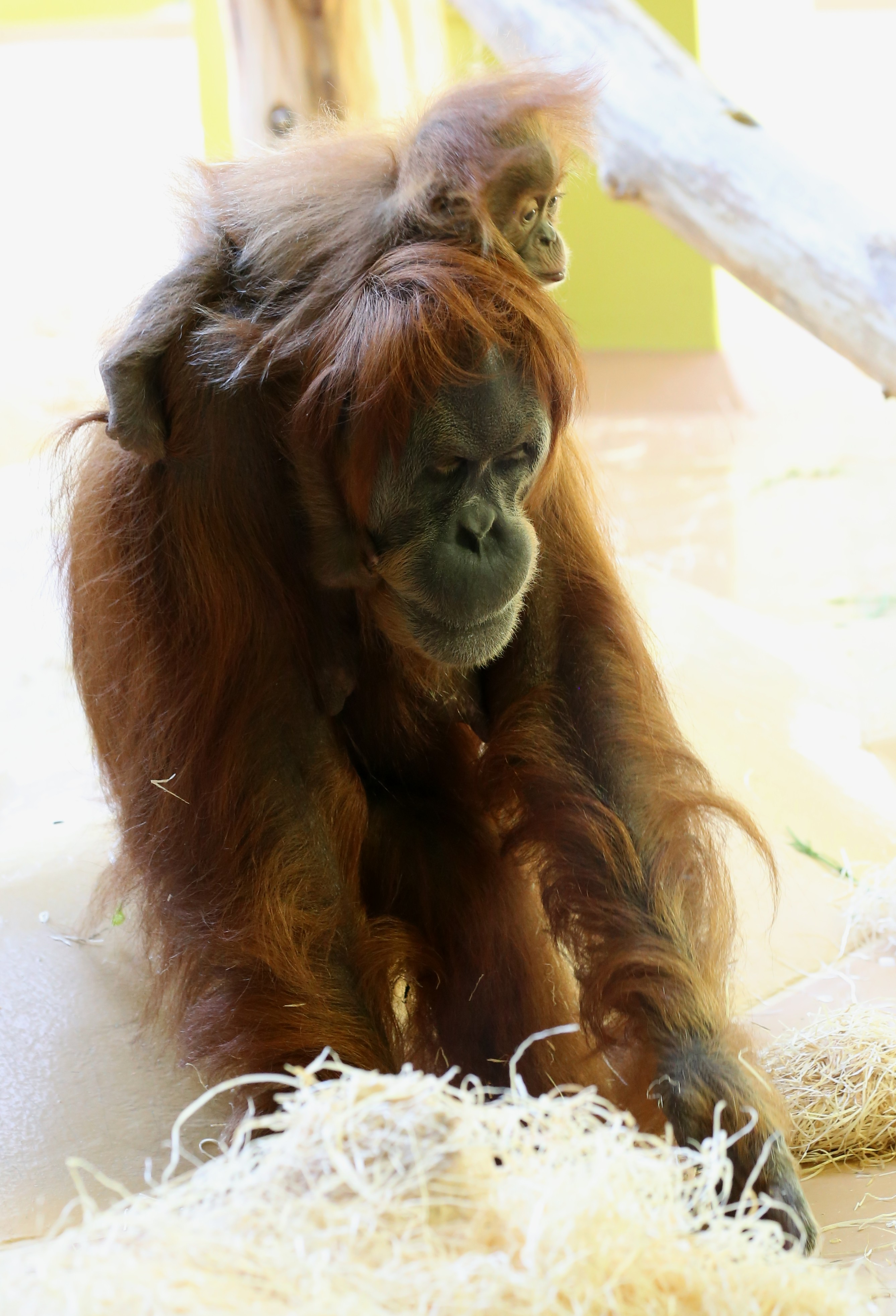
- Female with infant at the Tierpark Hellabrunn, Munich

Conservation status
- Critically Endangered (IUCN 3.1)
- CITES Appendix I

Scientific classification
- Kingdom: Animalia
- Phylum: Chordata
- Class: Mammalia
- Order: Primates
- Superfamily: Hominoidea
- Family: Hominidae
- Genus: Pongo
- Species: P. abelii

Binomial name
- Pongo abelii Lesson, 1827
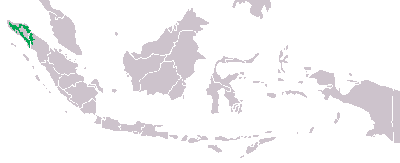
- Distribution in Indonesia

= Sumatran orangutan =

Species of ape

The Sumatran orangutan (Pongo abelii) is one of the three species of orangutans. Critically endangered, and found only in the north of the Indonesian island of Sumatra, it is rarer than the Bornean orangutan but more common than the recently identified Tapanuli orangutan, also found in Sumatra.

== Description ==
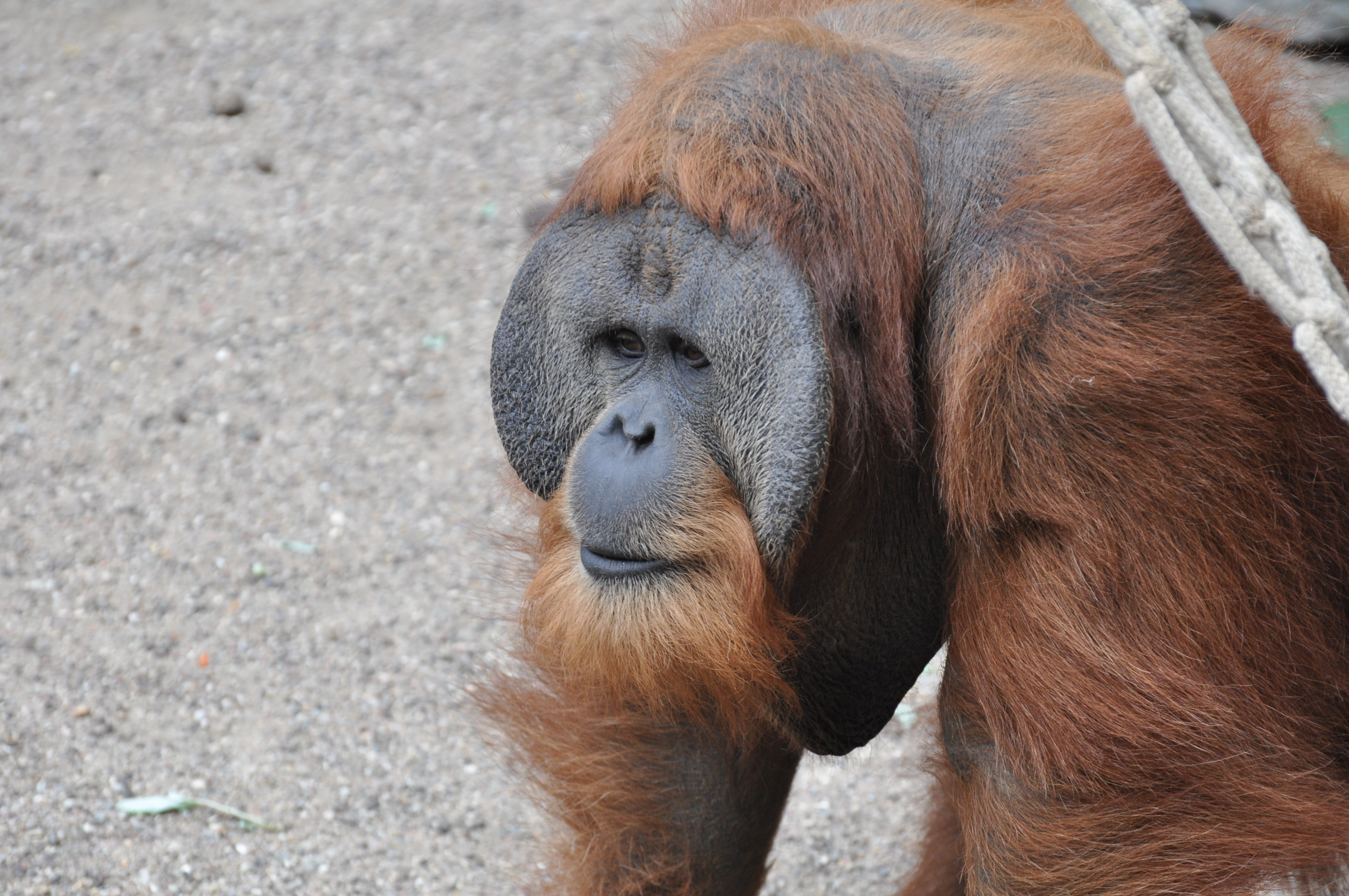
Close-up of an adult male, Tierpark Hagenbeck, Hamburg

Male Sumatran orangutans grow to about 1.7 m (5.6 ft) tall and 90 kg (200 lb), while females are smaller, averaging 90 cm (3.0 ft) and 45 kg (99 lb). Compared to the Bornean species, Sumatran orangutans are thinner and have longer faces; their hair is longer and has a paler red color.

== Evolution ==
Fossil orangutans in Sumatra from the Pleistocene had similar diets to present day Sumatran orangutans, consisting mainly of soft fruit as evidenced by dental microwear.

== Behaviour and ecology ==
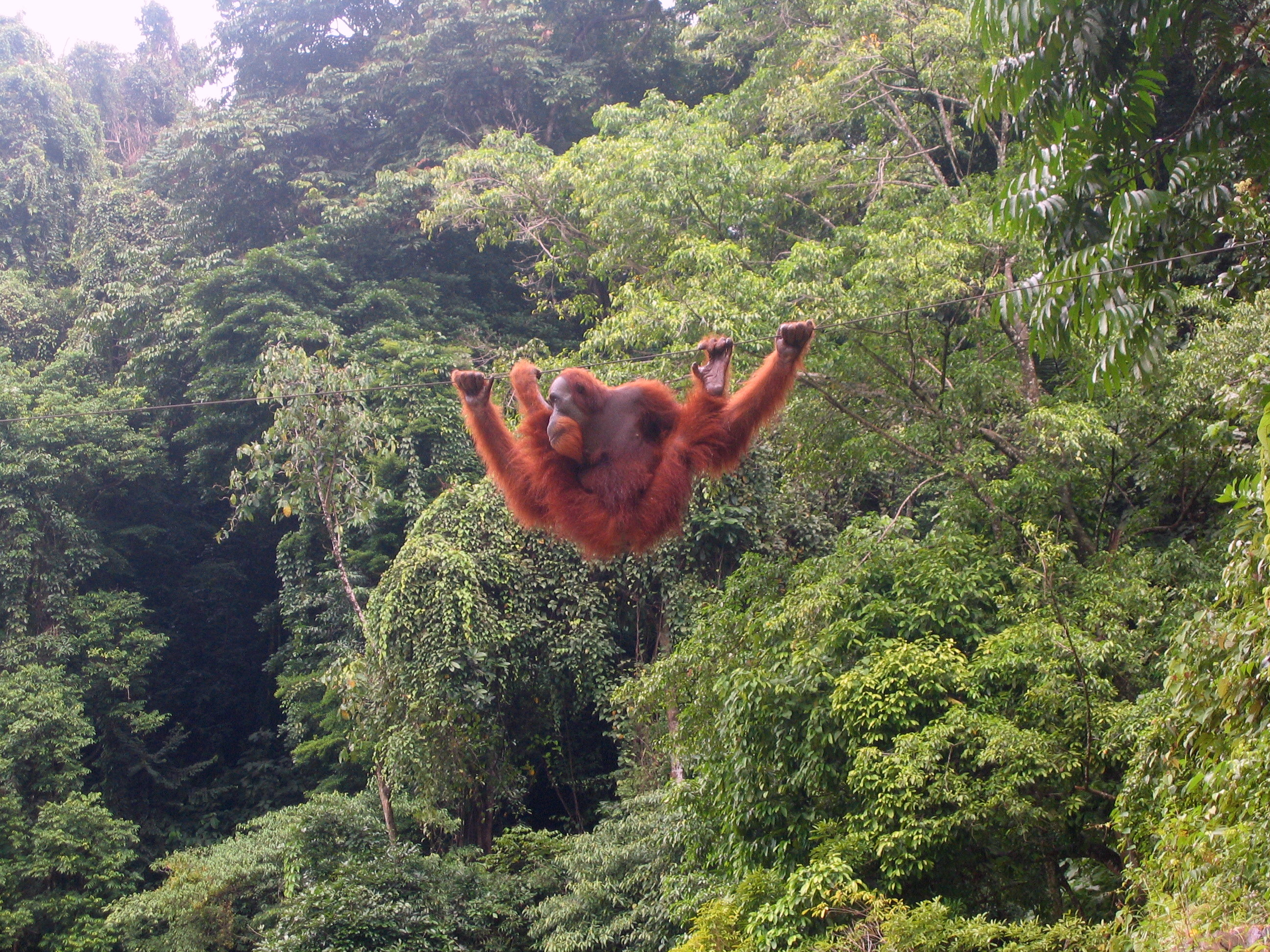
At Bukit Lawang, Indonesia

Compared with the Bornean orangutan, the Sumatran orangutan tends to be more frugivorous and especially insectivorous. Preferred fruits include figs and jackfruits. It will also eat bird eggs and small vertebrates. Sumatran orangutans spend far less time feeding on the inner bark of trees.

Wild Sumatran orangutans in the Suaq Balimbing swamp have been observed using tools. An orangutan will break off a tree branch that is about a foot long, snap off the twigs and fray one end with its teeth. The orangutan will use the stick to dig in tree holes for termites. They will also use the stick to poke a bee's nest wall, move it around and catch the honey. In addition, orangutans use tools to eat fruit. When the fruit of the Neesia tree ripens, its hard, ridged husk softens until it falls open. Inside are seeds that the orangutans enjoy eating, but they are surrounded by fiberglass-like hairs that are painful if eaten. Tools are created differently for different uses. Sticks are often made longer or shorter depending on whether they will be used for insects or fruit. If a particular tool proves useful, the orangutan will often save it. Over time, they will collect entire "toolboxes". A Neesia-eating orangutan will select a five-inch stick, strip off its bark, and then carefully collect the hairs with it. Once the fruit is safe, the ape will eat the seeds using the stick or its fingers. Although similar swamps can be found in Borneo, wild Bornean orangutans have not been seen using these types of tools.

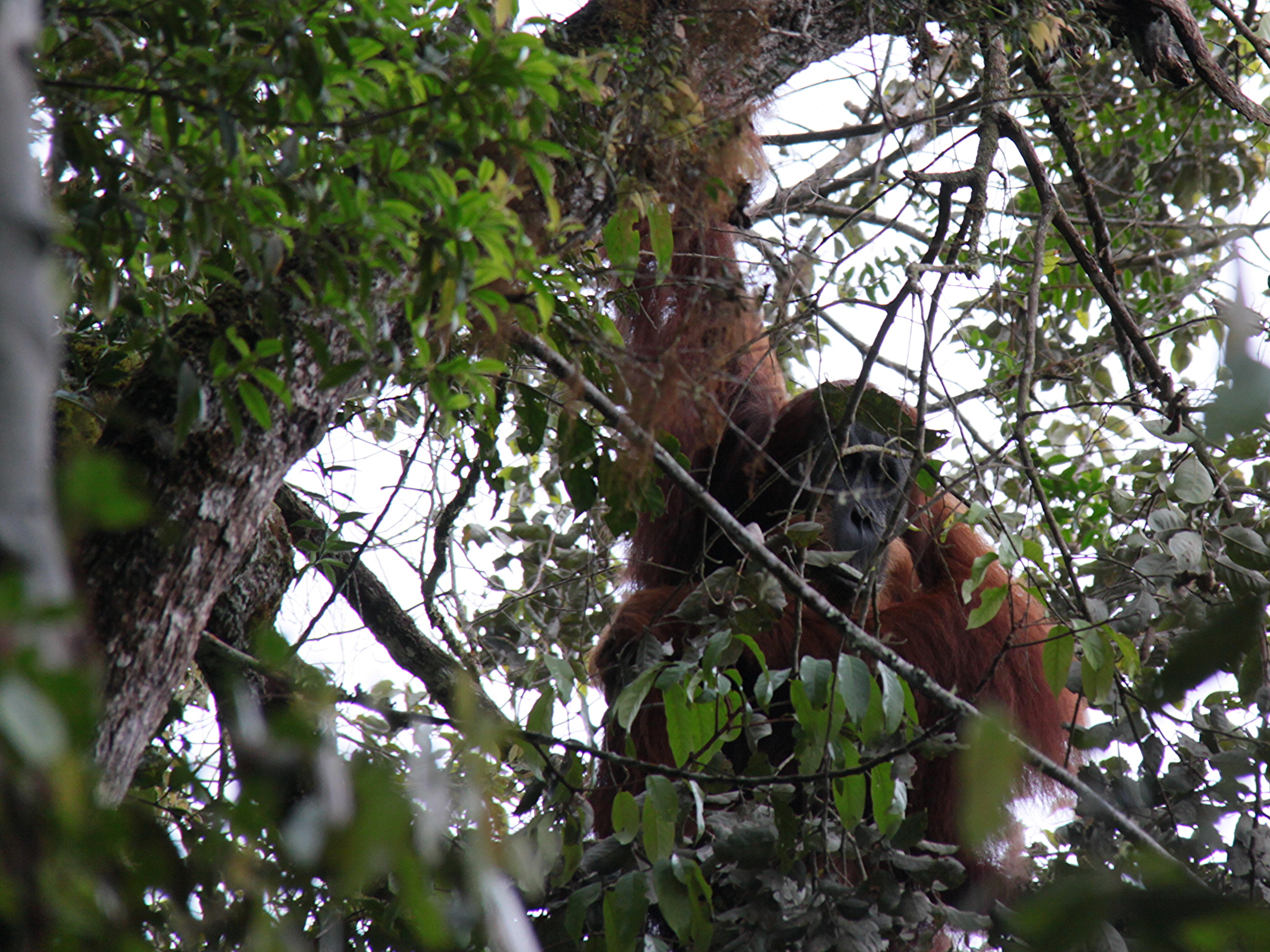
A male hidden in tree leaf pile, Mount Leuser National Park

NHNZ filmed the Sumatran orangutan for its show Wild Asia: In the Realm of the Red Ape; it showed one of them using a simple tool, a twig, to pry food from difficult places. There is also a sequence of an animal using a large leaf as an umbrella in a tropical rainstorm.

As well as being used as tools, tree branches are a means of transportation for the Sumatran orangutan. The orangutans are the heaviest mammals to travel by tree, which makes them particularly susceptible to the changes in arboreal compliance. To deal with this, their locomotion is characterized by slow movement, long contact times, and an impressively large array of locomotors postures. Orangutans have even been shown to utilize the compliance in vertical supports to lower the cost of locomotion by swaying trees back and forth and they possess unique strategies of locomotion, moving slowly and using multiple supports to limit oscillations in compliant branches, particularly at their tips.

The Sumatran orangutan is also more arboreal than its Bornean cousin; this could be because of the presence of large predators, like the Sumatran tiger. It moves through the trees by quadrumanous locomotion and semibrachiation.

As of 2017, the Sumatran orangutan species only has approximately 13,846 remaining members in its population. The World Wide Fund for Nature is thus carrying out attempts to protect the species by allowing them to reproduce in the safe environment of captivity. However, this comes at a risk to the Sumatran orangutan's native behaviors in the wild. While in captivity, the orangutans are at risk to the "Captivity Effect": animals held in captivity for a prolonged period will no longer know how to behave naturally in the wild. Being provided with water, food, and shelter while in captivity and lacking all the challenges of living in the wild, captive behaviour becomes more exploratory in nature.

A repertoire of 64 different gestures in use by orangutans has been identified, 29 of which are thought to have a specific meaning that can be interpreted by other orangutans the majority of the time. Six intentional meanings were identified: Affiliate/Play, Stop action, Look at/Take object, Share food/object, Co-locomote and Move away. Sumatran orangutans do not use sounds as part of their communication, which includes a lack of audible danger signals, but rather base their communication on gestures alone.

In 2024, a wild Sumatran orangutan, called Rakus, was observed applying a paste made from chewed Fibraurea tinctoria leaves to a facial wound, a treatment which appeared to heal the wound weeks later.

=== Life cycle ===
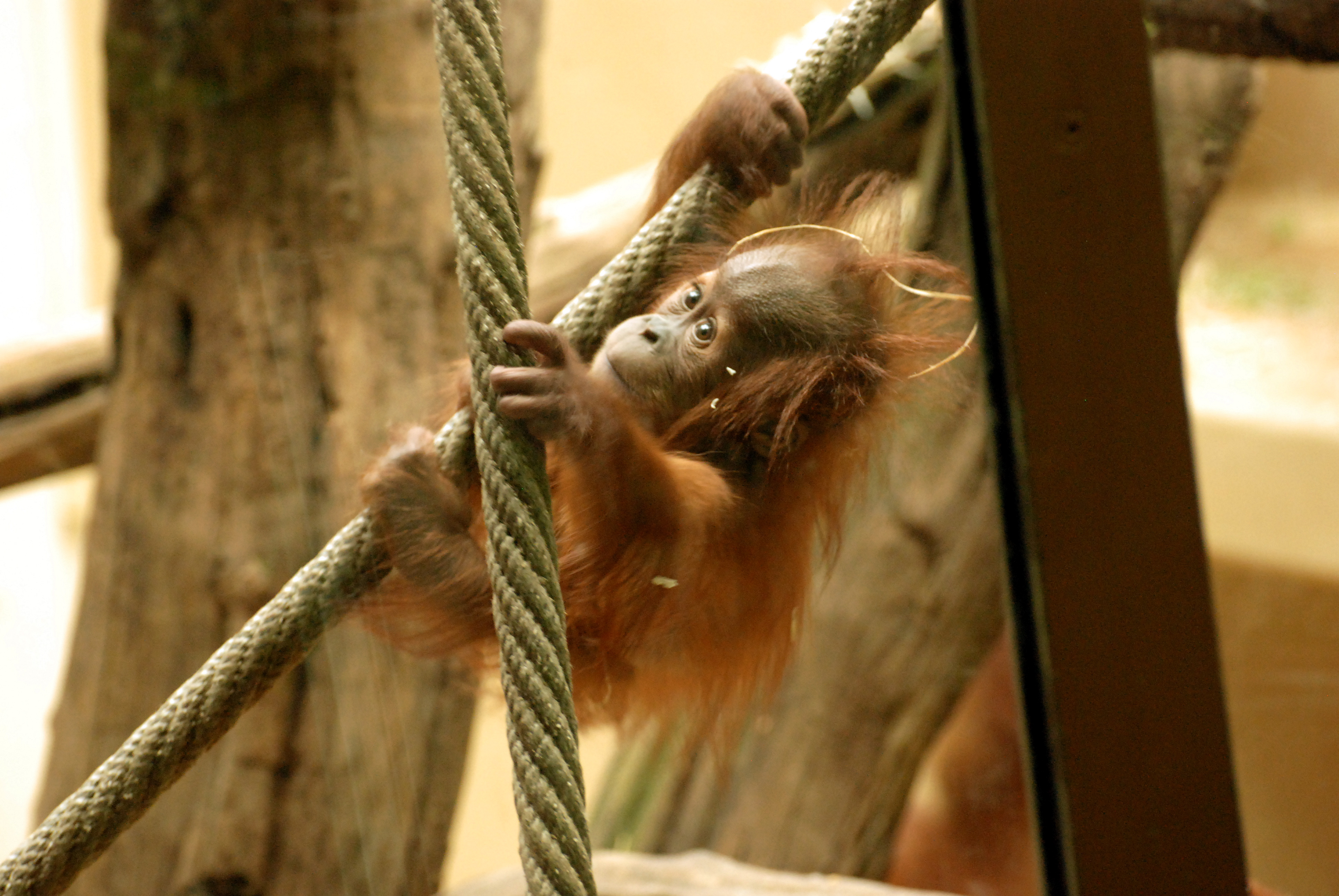
A baby plays on a line in Zurich Zoo.

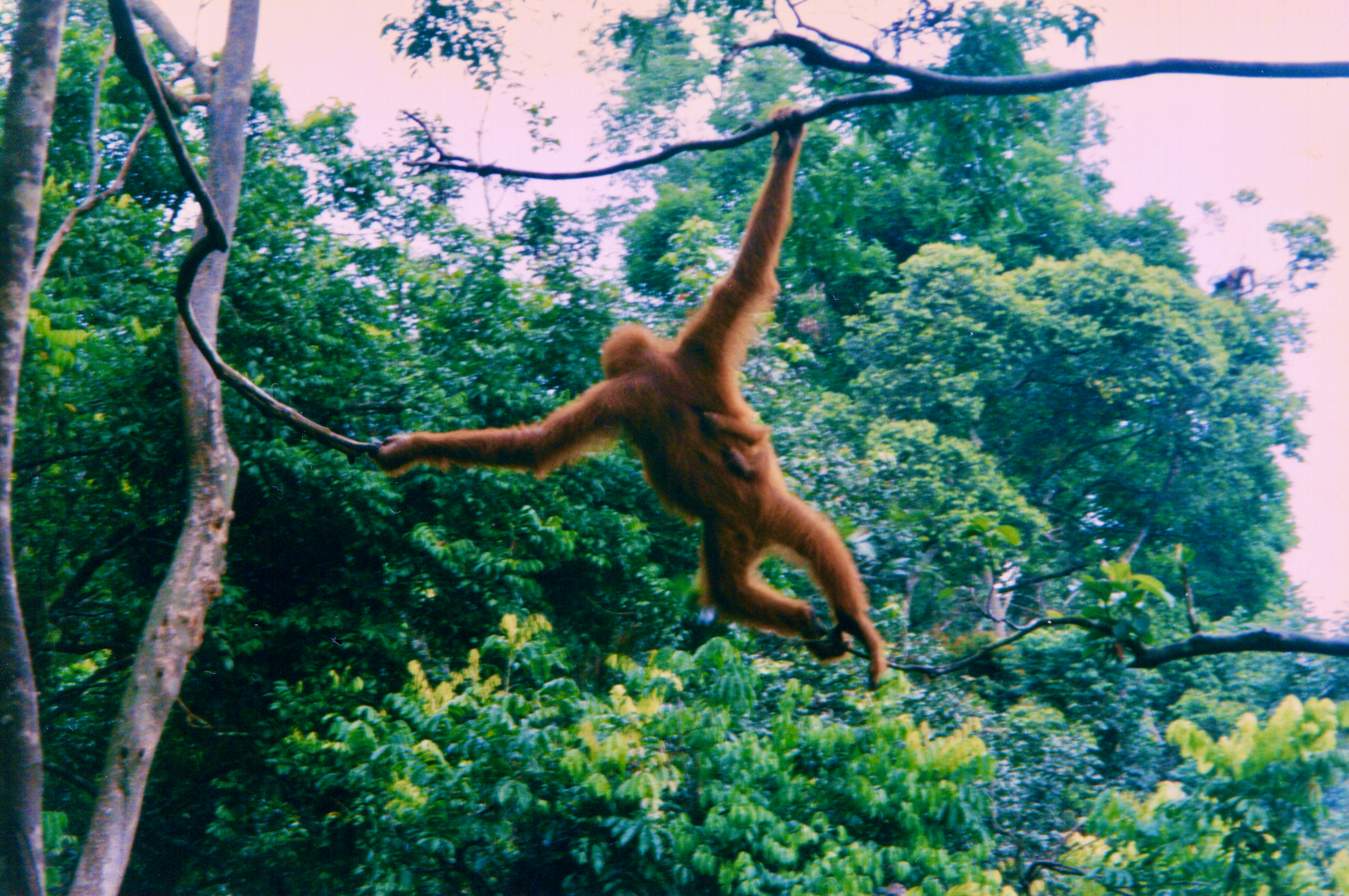
Adult and infant in Mount Leuser National Park

The Sumatran orangutan has five stages of life that are characterized by different physical and behavioral features. The first of these stages is infancy, which lasts from birth to around 2.5 years of age. The orangutan weighs between 2 and 6 kilograms. An infant is identified by light pigmented zones around the eyes and muzzle in contrast to darker pigmentation on the rest of the face as well as long hairs that protrude outward around the face. During this time, the infant is always carried by the mother during travel, it is highly dependent on the mother for food, and also sleeps in the mother's nest. The next stage is called juvenilehood and takes place between 2.5 and 5 years of age. The orangutan weighs between 6 and 15 kilograms, and does not look dramatically different from an infant. Although it is still mainly carried by the mother, a juvenile will often play with peers and make small exploratory trips within the vision of the mother. Towards the end of this stage, the orangutan will stop sleeping in the mother's nest and will build its own nest nearby. From the ages of 5 to 8 years of age, the orangutan is in an adolescent stage of life. The orangutan weighs around 15–30 kilograms. The light patches on the face start to disappear, and eventually the face becomes completely dark. During this time, orangutans still have constant contact with their mothers, yet they develop a stronger relationship with peers while playing in groups. They are still young and act with caution around unfamiliar adults, especially males. At 8 years of age, female orangutans are considered fully developed and begin to have offspring of their own. Males, however, enter a stage called sub-adulthood. This stage lasts from 8 to around 13 or 15 years of age, and the orangutans weigh around 30 to 50 kilograms. Their faces are completely dark, and they begin to develop cheek flanges. Their beard starts to emerge, while the hair around their face shortens, and instead of pointing outwards, the face flattens along the skull. This stage marks sexual maturity in males, yet these orangutans are still socially undeveloped and will still avoid contact with adult males. Finally, male Sumatran orangutans reach adulthood at 13 to 15 years of age. They are extremely large animals, weighing between 50 and 90 kilograms, roughly the weight of a fully grown human. They have a fully grown beard, fully developed cheek callosities, and long hair. These orangutans have reached full sexual and social maturity and now only travel alone.

Female Sumatran orangutans typically live 44–53 years in the wild, while males have a slightly longer lifespan of 47–58 years. Females are able to give birth up to 53 years of age, based on studies of menopausal cycles. Both males and females are usually considered healthy even at the end of their lifespans and can be identified as such by the regular abundance of hair growth and robust cheek pads.

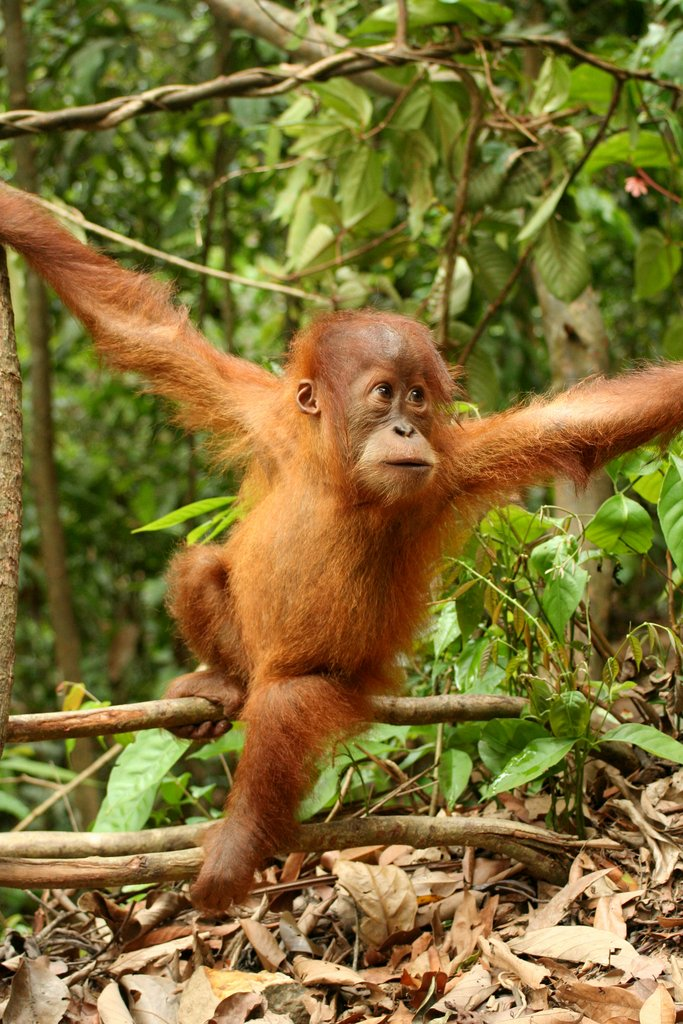
A baby hanging onto branches at Bukit Lawang

The Sumatran orangutan is more social than its Bornean counterpart; groups gather to feed on the mass amounts of fruit on fig trees. The Sumatran orangutan community is best described as loose, not showing social or spatial exclusivity. Groups generally consist of female clusters and a preferred male mate. However, adult males generally avoid contact with other adult males. Subadult males will try to mate with any female, although mostly unsuccessfully, since mature females are easily capable of fending them off. Mature females prefer to mate with mature males. Usually, there is a specific male in a group that mature females will exhibit preference for. Male Sumatran orangutans sometimes have a delay of many years in the development of secondary sexual characteristics, such as cheek flanges and muscle mass.

Males exhibit bimaturism, whereby fully flanged adult males and the smaller unflanged males are both capable of reproducing, but employ differing mating strategies to do so.

The average interbirth rates for the Sumatran orangutan is 9.3 years, the longest reported among the great apes, including the Bornean orangutan. Infant orangutans will stay close to their mothers for up to three years. Even after that, the young will still associate with their mothers. Both the Sumatran and Bornean orangutans are likely to live several decades; estimated longevity is more than 50 years. The average age of the first reproduction of male P. abelii is around 15.4 years old. There is no indication of menopause.

Nonja, thought to be the world's oldest orangutan in captivity or the wild at the time of her death, died at the Miami MetroZoo at the age of 55. Puan, an orangutan at Perth Zoo, is believed to have been 62 years old at the time of her death, making her the oldest recorded orangutan. The current oldest orangutan in the world is believed to be Bella, a female orangutan at the Hagenbeck Zoo, who is 61 years of age.

=== Diet ===
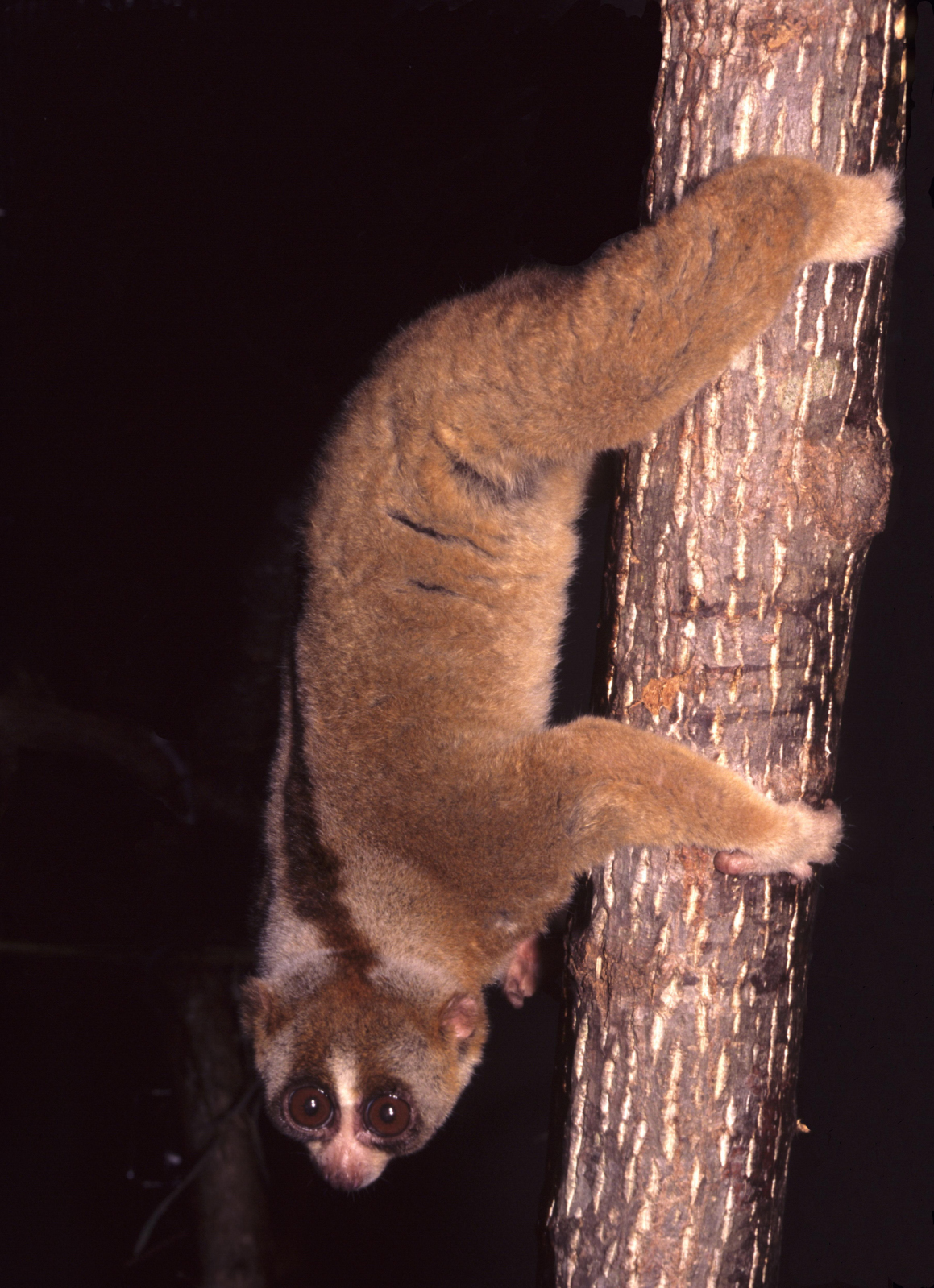
A slow loris can be part of the diet of Sumatran orangutan.

Sumatran orangutans are primarily frugivores, favoring fruits consisting of a large seed and surrounded by a fleshy substance, such as durians, lychees, jackfruit, breadfruit, and fig fruits. Insects are also a huge part of the orangutan's diet; the most consumed types are ants, predominantly of the genus Camponotus (at least four species indet), as well as termites and crickets. Their main diet can be broken up into five categories: fruits, insects, leaf material, bark and flowers, and other miscellaneous food items. Studies have shown that orangutans in the Ketambe area in Indonesia ate over 92 different kinds of fruit, 13 different kinds of leaves, 22 sorts of other vegetable material such as top-sprouts, and pseudo-bulbs of orchids. Insects included in the diet are numbered at least 17 different types. Occasionally soil from termite mounds and eggs were ingested in small quantities. When there is low ripe fruit availability, Sumatran orangutans will eat the meat of the slow loris, a nocturnal primate. Water consumption for the orangutans was ingested from natural bowls created in the trees they lived around. They even drank water from the hair on their arms when rainfall was heavy.

==== Meat-eating ====
Meat-eating happens rarely in Sumatran orangutan, and orangutans do not show a male bias in meat-eating. Research in the Ketambe area reported cases of meat-eating in wild Sumatran orangutans, of which nine cases were of orangutans eating slow lorises. The research shows, in the most recent three cases of slow lorises eaten by Sumatran orangutan, a maximum mean feeding rate of the adult orangutan for an entire adult male slow loris is 160.9 g/h and, of the infant, 142.4 g/h. No cases have been reported during mast years, which suggests orangutans take meat as a fallback for the seasonal shortage of fruits; preying on slow loris occurs more often in periods of low fruit availability. Similar to most primate species, orangutans appear to only share meat between mother and infants.

== Genomics ==
Genomic information
- NCBI ID: GCF_028885655.2
- Ploidy: diploid
- Genome size: 3,441.24 Mb
- Number of chromosomes: 24 pairs
- Year of completion: 2011
- UCSC Genome Browser assembly ID: ponAbe3

Orangutans have 48 chromosomes. The Sumatran orangutan genome was sequenced in January 2011, based on a captive female named Susie. Following humans and chimpanzees, the Sumatran orangutan has become the third extant hominid species to have its genome sequenced.

The researchers also published less complete copies from ten wild orangutans, five from Borneo and five from Sumatra. The genetic diversity was found to be lower in Bornean orangutans (Pongo pygmaeus) than in Sumatran ones (Pongo abelii), despite the fact that Borneo is home to six or seven times as many orangutans as Sumatra. The comparison has shown these two species diverged around 400,000 years ago, more recently than was previously thought. The orangutan genome also has fewer rearrangements than the chimpanzee/human lineage.

== Conservation ==
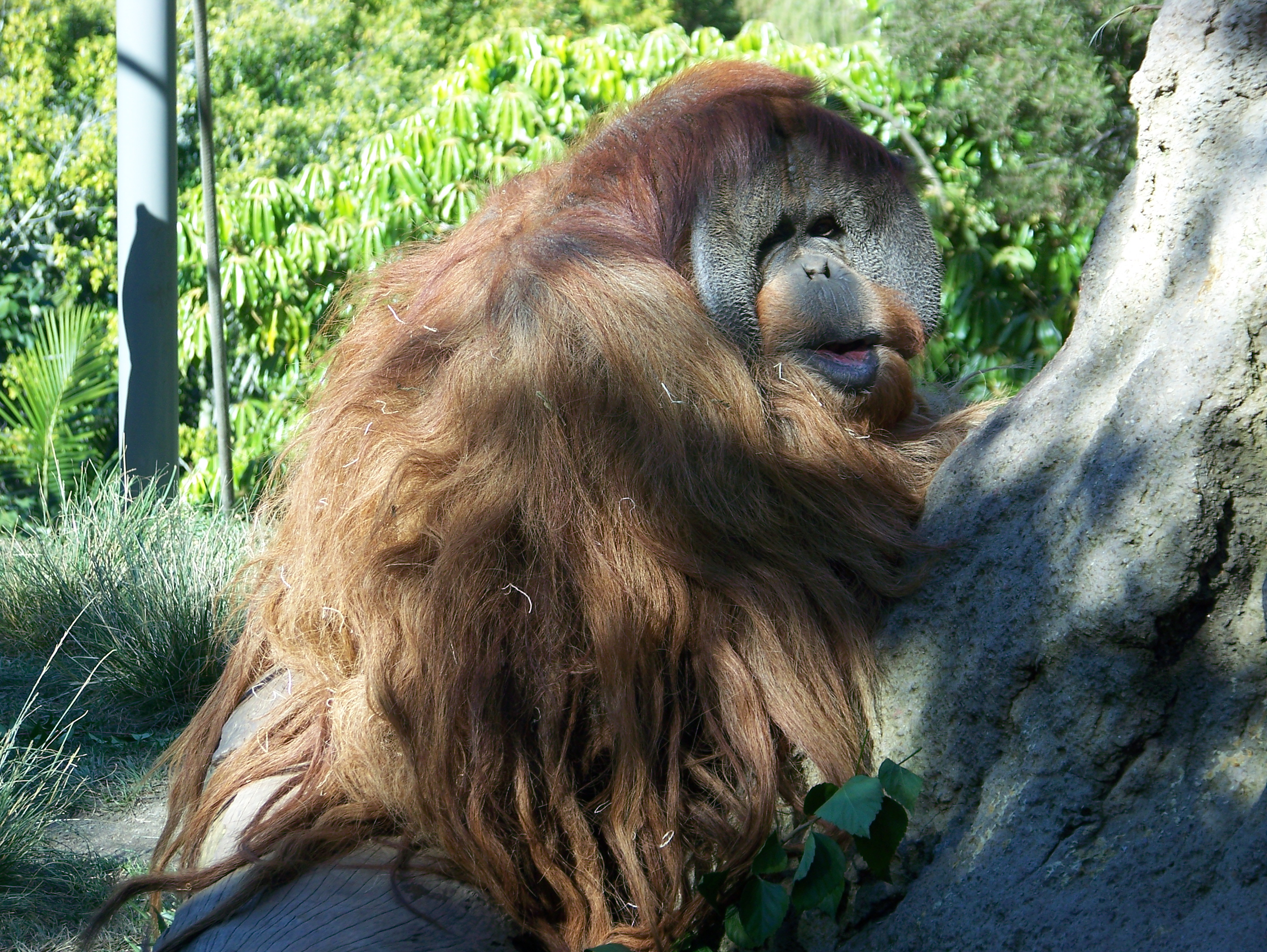
At the San Diego Zoo

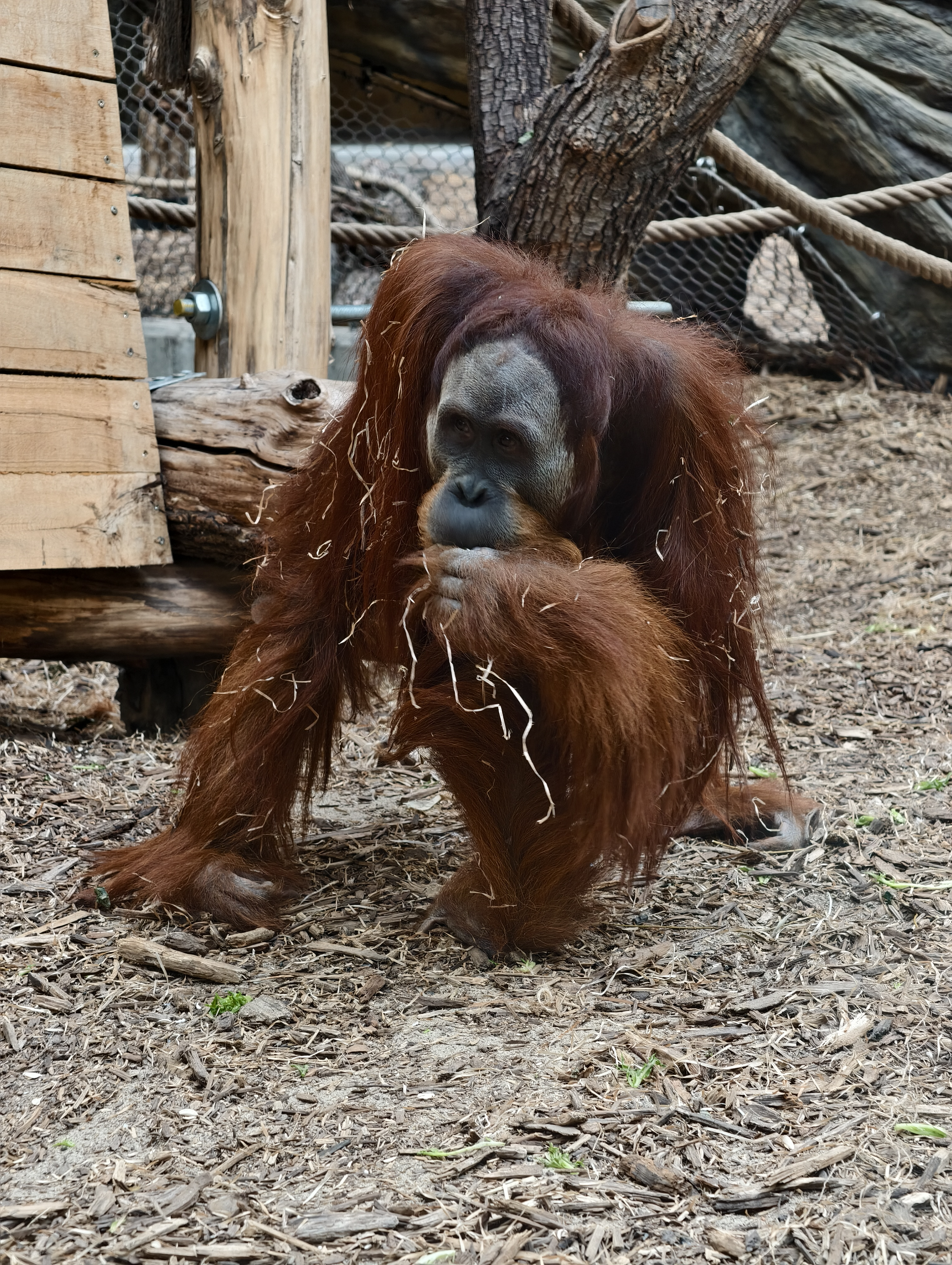
At Orientarium Zoo, Łódź, Poland

=== Threats ===
Sumatrans encounter threats such as logging (both legal and illegal), wholesale conversion of forest to agricultural land and oil palm plantations, and fragmentation by roads. Oil companies use a method of deforestation to re-use land for palm oil. This land is taken from the forest in which Sumatran orangutans live. An assessment of forest loss in the 1990s concluded that forests supporting at least 1,000 orangutans were lost each year within the Leuser Ecosystem alone.

As of 2017, approximately 82.5% of the Sumatran orangutan population was strictly confined to the northernmost tip of the island, in the Aceh Province. Orangutans are rarely, if ever, found south of the Simpang Kanan River on Sumatra's west side or south of the Asahan River on the east side. The Pakpak Barat population in particular is the only Sumatran population predicted to be able to sustain orangutans in the long run, given the current effects of habitat displacement and human impact.

While poaching generally is not a huge problem for the Sumatrans, occasional local hunting does decrease the population size. They have been hunted in the Northern Sumatra in the past as targets for food; although deliberate attempts to hunt the Sumatrans are rare nowadays, locals such as the Batak people are known to eat almost all vertebrates in their area. Additionally, the Sumatrans are treated as pests by Sumatran farmers, becoming targets of elimination if they are seen damaging or stealing crops. For commercial aspects, hunts for both dead or live specimens have also been recorded as an effect of the demand by European and North American zoos and institutions throughout the 20th century.

Sumatran orangutans have developed a highly functioning cardiovascular system. However, with this development of hugely improved air sacs in their lungs, air sacculitis has become more prevalent among orangutans in this species. Air sacculitis is similar to streptococcal infection, e.g. strep throat in Homo sapiens. The bacterial infection is becoming increasingly common in captive orangutans, due to the fact that they are exposed to the human strain of Streptococcus in captivity. At first, both strains are treated and cured with antibiotics along with rest. Yet, in 2014, a Sumatran orangutan, ten years in captivity, was the first of its species to die from Streptococcus anginosus. This remains the only known case, but raises the question of why the known human cure for Streptococcus was ineffective in this case.

=== Conservation status ===
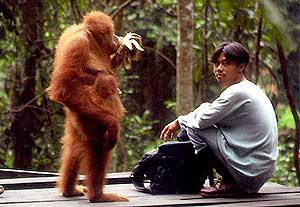
With a human, Bukit Lawang

The Sumatran orangutan is endemic to the north of Sumatra. In the wild, Sumatran orangutans only survive in the province of Nanggroe Aceh Darussalam (NAD), the northernmost tip of the island. The primate was once more widespread, as they were found farther to the south in the 19th century, such as in Jambi and Padang. There are small populations in the North Sumatra province along the border with NAD, particularly in the Lake Toba forests. A survey in the Lake Toba region found only two inhabited areas, Bukit Lawang (defined as the animal sanctuary) and Gunung Leuser National Park. Bukit Lawang is a jungle village, 90 kilometres (56 mi) northwest of Medan, situated at the eastern side of Gunung Leuser National Park. An orangutan sanctuary was set up here by a Swiss organisation in the 1970s to attempt to rehabilitate orangutans captured from the logging industry. The rangers were trained to teach the orangutans vital jungle skills to enable them to reintegrate into the forest, and provided additional supplementary food from a feeding platform. However, within the last few years, supplementary feeding has ceased as the orangutan rehabilitation program has been deemed a success, the orangutans having been fully rehabilitated, and the jungle (or the remaining part of) is now at saturation point, so the sanctuary no longer accepts new orphaned orangutans.

The species has been assessed as critically endangered on the IUCN Red List since 2000. From 2000–2008 it was considered one of "The World's 25 Most Endangered Primates."

A survey published in March 2016 estimates a population of 14,613 Sumatran orangutans in the wild, doubling previous population estimates. A survey in 2004 estimated that around 7,300 Sumatran orangutans still live in the wild. The same study estimates a 20,552-square-kilometre (7,935 sq mi) occupied area for the Sumatran orangutans, of which only an approximate area range of 8,992 km^{2} (3,472 sq mi) harbors permanent populations. Some of them are being protected in five areas in Gunung Leuser National Park; others live in unprotected areas: northwest and northeast Aceh block, West Batang Toru river, East Sarulla and Sidiangkat. A successful breeding program has been established in Bukit Tiga Puluh National Park in Jambi and Riau provinces.

Two strategies that are recently being considered to conserve this species are 1) rehabilitation and reintroduction of ex-captive or displaced individuals and 2) the protection of their forest habitat by preventing threats such as deforestation and hunting. The former was determined to be more cost efficient for maintaining the wild orangutan populations, but comes with longer time scale of 10–20 years. The latter approach has better prospects for ensuring long-term stability of populations. This type of habitat conservation approach has been pursued by the World Wide Fund for Nature, who joined forces with several other organizations to stop the clearing of the biggest part of remaining natural forest close to the Bukit Tigapuluh National Park.

In addition to the above extant wild populations, a new population is being established in the Bukit Tigapuluh National Park (Jambi and Riau Provinces) via the re-introduction of confiscated illegal pets. This population currently numbers around 70 individuals and is reproducing. However it has been concluded that forest conservation costs twelve times less than reintroducing orangutans into the wild, and conserves more biological diversity.

Orangutans have large home ranges and low population densities, which complicates conservation efforts. Population densities depend to a large degree on the abundance of fruits with soft pulp. Sumatran orangutan will commute seasonally between lowland, intermediate, and highland regions, following fruit availability. Undisturbed forests with broader altitudinal range can thus sustain larger orangutan populations; conversely, the fragmentation and extensive clearance of forest ranges breaks up this seasonal movement. Sumatra currently has one of the highest deforestation rates in the world.

In April 2026, a Sumatran orangutan was filmed using a handmade rope bridge to cross a road in Indonesia for the first time, which proved to be a successful low-cost solution for reconnecting habitats fragmented by human infrastructure.

== Predation ==
Potential predators of Sumatran orangutans in the Sikundur Monitoring Post include Sumatran tigers, Sunda clouded leopards, pythons (Python spp.) and grey-headed fish eagles.

== See also ==
- Ah Meng
- Bonobo
- Environmental issues in Indonesia
- Fauna of Indonesia
- Mountain gorilla
