= Volcanism of Java =

Volcanic activity on the Indonesian island of Java

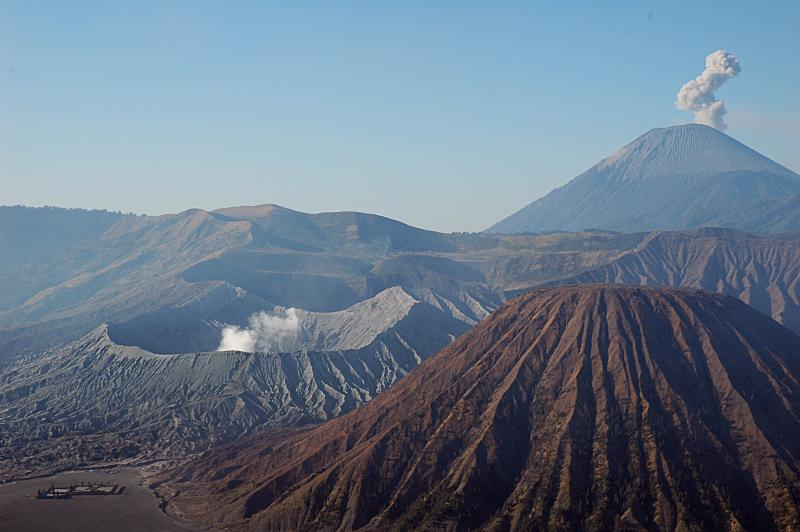
View of Semeru and Bromo eruption with Mount Batok in East Java

The Indonesian island of Java is almost entirely of volcanic origin, and contains numerous volcanoes, 45 of which are considered active volcanoes. As is the case for many other Indonesian islands, volcanoes have played a vital role in the geological and human history of Java. Land is created on Java as a result of lava flows, ash deposits, and mud flows (lahars). Volcanoes are a major contributor to the immense fertility of Java, as natural erosion transports volcanic material as alluvium to the island's plains, forming thick layers of fertile sediment. The benefit is not just in the immediate vicinity of the volcano, with fine ash emitted from eruptions being dispersed over wide areas.

Climbing volcanoes (and other mountains) is increasingly popular.

== List of volcanoes ==
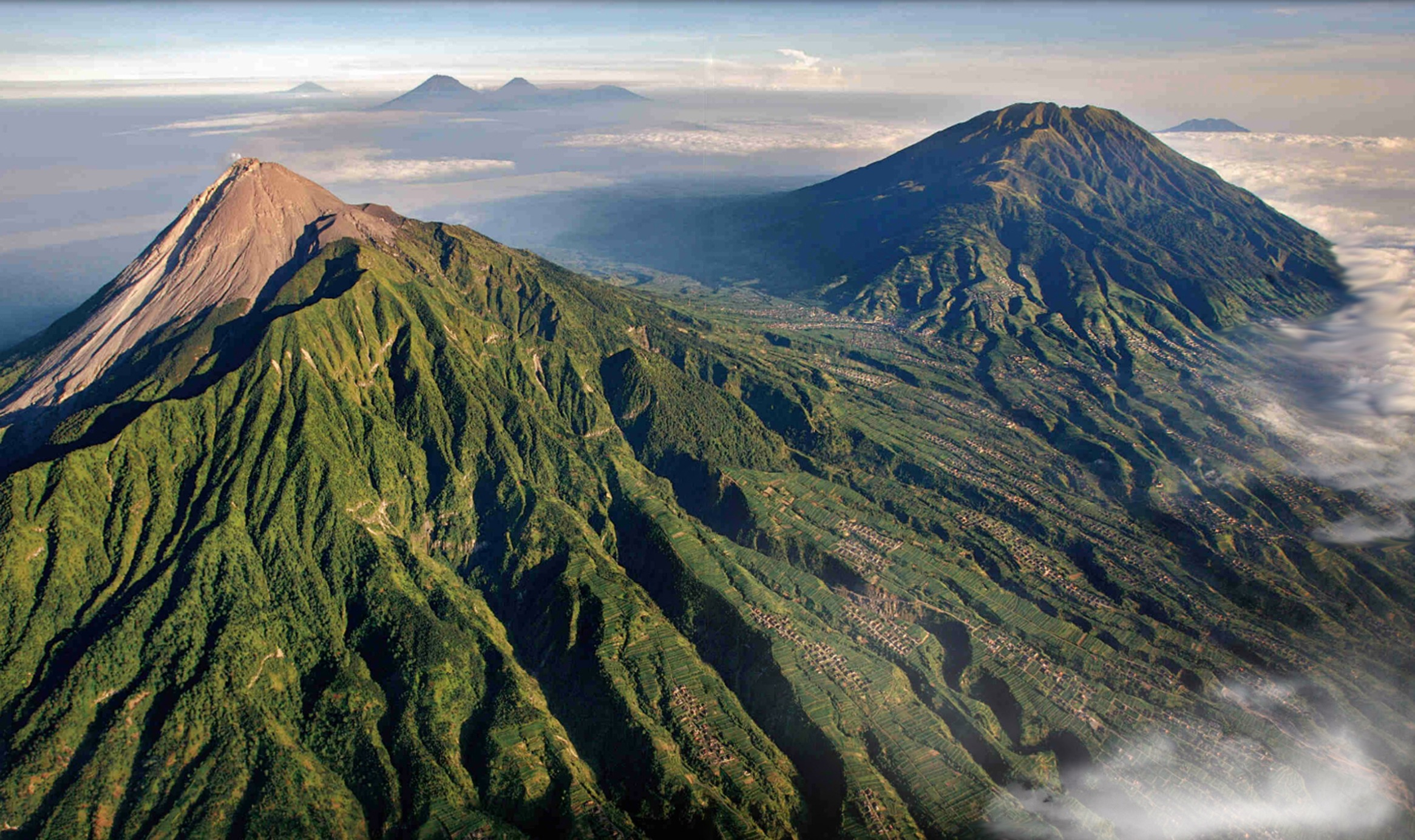
Mount Merapi (left foreground) and Merbabu (right); with far view of Mount Ungaran, Sumbing, Sundoro, Dieng, and Slamet in Central Java

This list is of volcanoes from the west of Java to the east. Local terminology and usage has the word Gunung (mount or mountain) precede the names.

=== West Java ===
- Mount Cereme Stratovolcano
- Mount Galunggung Stratovolcano
- Mount Gede Stratovolcano
- Mount Guntur Complex volcano
- Kamojang Geothermal field
- Karaha Crater Fumarole field
- Gunung Karang Stratovolcano
- Mount Kendang Stratovolcano
- Mount Kendeng Stratovolcano
- Mount Kiaraberes-Gagak Stratovolcano
- Mount Malabar Stratovolcano
- Mount Pangrango Stratovolcano
- Mount Papandayan Complex stratovolcano
- Mount Patuha Stratovolcano
- Perbakti Stratovolcano
- Mount Pulosari Stratovolcano
- Mount Salak Stratovolcano
- Mount Talagabodas Stratovolcano
- Mount Tampomas Stratovolcano
- Tangkuban Parahu Stratovolcano
- Wayang-Windu Twin volcanoes

=== Central Java ===
- Mount Slamet Stratovolcano
- Dieng Volcanic Complex Complex volcano
- Mount Sundoro Stratovolcano
- Mount Sumbing Stratovolcano
- Mount Ungaran Stratovolcano
- Mount Telomoyo Stratovolcano
- Mount Merbabu Stratovolcano
- Mount Merapi Stratovolcano
- Mount Muria Stratovolcano
- Mount Lawu Stratovolcano (bordering with East Java)

=== East Java ===
- Mount Lawu Stratovolcano (bordering with Central Java)
- Mount Wilis Stratovolcano
- Kelut Stratovolcano
- Kawi-Butak Stratovolcanoes
- Arjuno-Welirang Stratovolcano
- Penanggungan Stratovolcano
- Malang Plain Maars
- Semeru Stratovolcano
- Mount Bromo
- Lamongan Stratovolcano
- Mount Lurus
- Iyang-Argapura Complex volcano
- Raung Stratovolcano
- Ijen Stratovolcanoes
- Baluran Stratovolcano

== List of active volcanoes ==
| Name | Shape | Elevation | | Last eruption (VEI) | Geolocation |
| Name | Shape | m | ft | Last eruption (VEI) | Geolocation |
|---|---|---|---|---|---|
| Pulosari | stratovolcano | 1,346 | 4,416 | unknown | 6.342°S 105.975°E |
| Sromo | stratovolcano | 1,778 | 5,833 | unknown | 6.27°S 106.042°E |
| Kiaraberes-Gagak | stratovolcano | 1,511 | 4,957 | 6 Apr 1939 (1) | 6.73°S 106.65°E |
| Perbakti | stratovolcano | 1,699 | 5,574 | unknown | 6.75°S 106.68°E |
| Salak | stratovolcano | 2,211 | 7,254 | 31 Jan 1938 (2) | 6.72°S 106.73°E |
| Gede | stratovolcano | 2,958 | 9,705 | 13 Mar 1957 (2) | 6.78°S 106.98°E |
| Patuha | stratovolcano | 2,434 | 7,986 | unknown | 7.160°S 107.40°E |
| Wayang-Windu | lava dome | 2,182 | 7,159 | unknown | 7.208°S 107.63°E |
| Malabar | stratovolcano | 2,343 | 7,687 | unknown | 7.13°S 107.65°E |
| Tangkuban Perahu | stratovolcano | 2,084 | 6,837 | 26 Jul 2019 (1) | 6.77°S 107.60°E |
| Papandayan | stratovolcano | 2,665 | 8,743 | 11 Nov 2002 (2) | 7.32°S 107.73°E |
| Kendang | stratovolcano | 2,608 | 8,556 | unknown | 7.23°S 107.72°E |
| Kamojang | stratovolcano | 1,730 | 5,680 | Pleistocene | 7.125°S 107.80°E |
| Guntur | complex volcano | 2,249 | 7,379 | 16 Oct 1847 (2) | 7.143°S 107.840°E |
| Tampomas | stratovolcano | 1,684 | 5,525 | unknown | 6.77°S 107.95°E |
| Galunggung | stratovolcano | 2,168 | 7,113 | 9 Jan 1984 (1) | 7.25°S 108.058°E |
| Talagabodas | stratovolcano | 2,201 | 7,221 | unknown | 7.208°S 108.07°E |
| Karaha | fumarole | 1,155 | 3,789 | unknown | 7.12°S 108.08°E |
| Cereme | stratovolcano | 3,078 | 10,098 | 1951 | 6.892°S 108.40°E |
| Slamet | stratovolcano | 3,432 | 11,260 | 1 May 1999 (1) | 7.242°S 109.208°E |
| Dieng | complex volcano | 2,565 | 8,415 | 31 Dec 1996 (1) | 7.20°S 109.92°E |
| Sundoro | stratovolcano | 3,136 | 10,289 | 29 Oct 1971 (2) | 7.30°S 109.992°E |
| Sumbing | stratovolcano | 3,371 | 11,060 | 1730 (1) | 7.384°S 110.070°E |
| Ungaran | stratovolcano | 2,050 | 6,730 | unknown | 7.18°S 110.33°E |
| Telomoyo | stratovolcano | 1,894 | 6,214 | unknown | 7.37°S 110.40°E |
| Merbabu | stratovolcano | 3,145 | 10,318 | 1797 (2) | 7.45°S 110.43°E |
| Merapi | stratovolcano | 2,968 | 9,738 | 28 Mar 2020 (3) | 7.542°S 110.442°E |
| Muria | stratovolcano | 1,625 | 5,331 | 160 ± 30 years | 6.62°S 110.88°E |
| Lawu | stratovolcano | 3,265 | 10,712 | 28 Nov 1885 (1) | 7.625°S 111.192°E |
| Wilis | stratovolcano | 2,563 | 8,409 | unknown | 7.808°S 111.758°E |
| Kelud | stratovolcano | 1,731 | 5,679 | 13 Feb 2014 (4) | 7.93°S 112.308°E |
| Kawi-Butak | stratovolcano | 2,651 | 8,698 | unknown | 7.92°S 112.45°E |
| Arjuno-Welirang | stratovolcano | 3,339 | 10,955 | 15 Aug 1952 (0) | 7.725°S 112.58°E |
| Penanggungan | stratovolcano | 1,653 | 5,423 | unknown | 7.62°S 112.63°E |
| Malang Plain | maar | 680 | 2,230 | unknown | 8.02°S 112.68°E |
| Semeru | stratovolcano | 3,676 | 12,060 | 1967–2021 continuing (3) | 8.108°S 112.92°E |
| Tengger | stratovolcano | 2,329 | 7,641 | 8 Jun 2004 (2) | 7.942°S 112.95°E |
| Lamongan | stratovolcano | 1,651 | 5,417 | 5 Feb 1898 (2) | 7.979°S 113.342°E |
| Lurus | complex volcano | 539 | 1,768 | unknown | 7.73°S 113.58°E |
| Iyang-Argapura | complex volcano | 3,088 | 10,131 | unknown | 7.97°S 113.57°E |
| Raung | stratovolcano | 3,332 | 10,932 | 3 Oct 2020 (1) | 8.125°S 114.042°E |
| Ijen | stratovolcano | 2,799 | 9,183 | 28 Jun 1999 (1) | 8.058°S 114.242°E |
| Baluran | stratovolcano | 1,247 | 4,091 | unknown | 7.85°S 114.37°E |

== See also ==
- Reinout Willem van Bemmelen
- List of volcanoes in Indonesia
