= Pulosari (volcano) =

Stratovolcano at the western end of Java

Mount Pulosari
- Pulasari; Poelasari; Batuwara
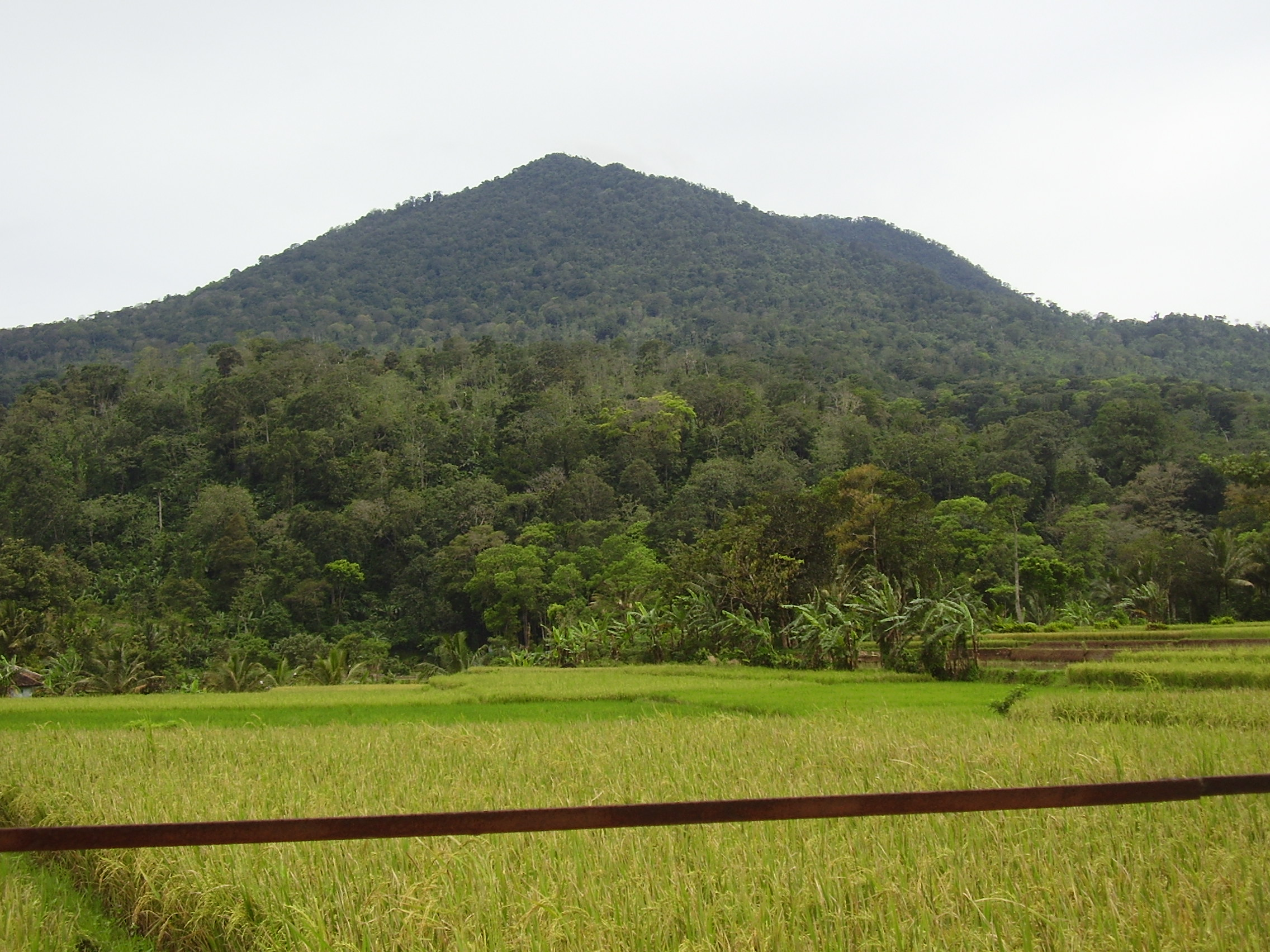

Highest point
- Elevation: 1,324 m (4,344 ft)
- Coordinates: 6.343°S 105.978°E

Geography
- Location within Java Location within Indonesia
- Country: Indonesia
- Island: Java
- Province: Banten
- Regency: Pandeglang

Geology
- Rock age: Holocene
- Mountain type: Stratovolcano
- Volcanic arc: Sunda Arc
- Last eruption: Unknown

Mount Pulosari is a stratovolcano in Pandeglang Regency, Banten, in West Java Indonesia. There are active solfataras on its 300-metre (980 ft) deep caldera wall.

== Geology ==
Pulosari is included on the list of 116 Indonesian Holocene age volcanoes. It has been identified as a volcano in a fumarolic state with no known eruptions. Basalt, andesite, and pyroxene have all been identified in the petrology of the mountain.

An 1875 account describes the crater as consisting of "tan lava and traohite chunks", around 800 steps in diameter and shallow. It also states that the crater contains boiling mud and that the rim is permeated by sulfurous gas made more prominent should the ground be punctured.

== History ==
During the 10th century, a Hindu temple was built on the highland of the mountain, under the Sunda Kingdom. Five statues that share a single base depict Shiva Mahadewa, Durga, Batara Guru, Ganesha and Brahma; these are known as "Caringin" statues.

800 priests are said to have lived on the mountain under the leadership of Prabu Pucuk Umun during the era of Sunan Gunungjati and Maulana Hasanuddin of Banten in the 16th century. Hasanuddin lived there for almost a decade, and many converted to Islam. Those who did not left for the southern mountainous areas. Local history states that Hasanuddin required the converted priests to remain on the mountain, believing that a lack of pious guardians would be detrimental to the welfare of life on Java.

The stratovolcano has also been known by the name Poelasari and Pulasari. In The Book of Ancient Kings, Mount Pulosari is referred to as Mount Batuwara.

== Cultural structures ==
=== Cidaresi Bergores stone ===
At 06° 21' 39.5" S, 106° 00' 17.6" E stands the Cidaresi Bergores stone, a 175 cm (69 in) long by 102 cm (40 in) wide monolith with triangular shapes scored into the surface. Locally, the stone is called 'batu tumbung' or 'batu tum' because the triangles are representative of female genitals. The stone is composed of andesite and is located in the midst of rice paddies. It is considered a symbol of fertility.

=== Citaman pools ===
Sukasari Village stands at the base of Mount Pulosari and houses a complex of nine purification pools are located.

==== Cipanggitikan ====
The pool at Cipanggitikan has been covered by concrete, leaving a rectangular shape measuring 4 m (13 ft) by 5.86 m (19.2 ft). It has a depth of 80 cm (31 in), and the water is used in the supply for Pandeglang and is owned in part by the Regional Drinking Water Company (PDAM) [id] in Pandeglang.

==== Cikajayaan ====
Cikajayaan is west of Cipanggitikan and means "water of glory". Locals believe bathing in the pool will bring success. The pool is square, bordered by small rocks, and had an area comprising 3.8 m (12 ft) by 3.8 m (12 ft), with a depth of 53 cm (21 in). It is surrounded by Hibiscus rosa-sinensis.

==== Cikaapeusan ====
Approximately 10 m (33 ft) from Cikajayaan stands Cikaapeusan, known as the "water of bad luck". People bathe in the pool to get rid of their bad luck. It measures 4.80 m (15.7 ft) by 5.30 m (17.4 ft) with a depth of 70 cm (28 in), and is covered by concrete like Cipanggitikan, save for a small opening on one side.

==== Cipangantenan ====
Cipangantenan is approximately 8 m (26 ft) west of Cikaapeusan. It is in the shape of an "L", measuring 3.54 m (11.6 ft) by 2.90 m (9 ft 6 in) with a depth of 44 cm (17 in). This pool has a spring flowing directly into it that also flows into the larger Citaman Pool, and is surrounded by andesite rocks. The name means "wedding water" as it is believed that those who wish to find their "soul mate" must bathe in the water.

==== Cikapaliasan ====
Approximately 6 m (20 ft) west of Cikapangantenan, the waters of this pool are believed to protect from danger. The pool is shaped like a trapezoid and covers an area of 34.55 m (113.4 ft) square with a depth of 22 cm (8.7 in). The water from this pool flows directly into Citaman Pool.

==== Cikaputrian ====
The most popular of the nine pool, Cikaputrian measures 2 m (6 ft 7 in) by 2.4 m (7 ft 10 in) with a depth of 30 cm (12 in). It lies approximately 7 m (23 ft) to the northeast of Cikapaliasan.

==== Cikahuripan ====
Located to the left of the entrance to the Citaman site, the pool is bordered by andesite rocks and covers an area of 14.29 m (46.9 ft) square, with a depth of 60 cm (24 in).

==== Cikembangan ====
4 m (13 ft) southwest of Cikahuripan, Cikembangan – meaning "flower water" – is directly adjacent to Citaman Pool. It measures 2 m (6 ft 7 in) by 4.35 m (14.3 ft) and has a depth of 28 cm (11 in). It is covered with green moss.

==== Citaman ====
The largest of the pools, Citaman covers an area of 941.58 m (3,089.2 ft) square and a depth of up to 100 cm (39 in). The water flows directly into the Cigetir River. It has a divider, allowing for division between genders in using the pool. It is 175 m (574 ft) above sea level, located at coordinates 6° 25' 24.5" S and 105° 55' 09.8" E.

=== Goong complex ===
The Goong complex is approximately 30 km (19 mi) from the Pandeglang Regency government center. The word "Goong" is Sudanese for "gong" for the artifacts found among the megaliths. Several research studies were conducted to determine the cultural heritage of the site, concluding that the area is prehistoric and the stones are megaliths. It is located at coordinates 6° 20' 17.2" S and 105° 55' 18.9" E and is a terraced site, low on the west and high on the east. The resulting stepped contour is called Kaduguling Hill.

One of the megalith areas includes 12 stones in a cupola, one menhir surrounded by 10 cylindrical stones with flat tops and one gong shaped artifact. The formation is often referred to as a "meeting bracelet". There are five such constructions within the complex.

=== Ranjang stone ===
The flat-topped andesite stone located at Batu Ranjang [id] is known as a dolmen. Though these are traditionally grave sites, this particular location is thought to have been used for the worship of ancestral spirits.

=== Sirit Gopar site ===
On the slopes of Mount Pulosari at 6° 19' 20.4" S and 105° 58' 52" E stand a number of menhirs in the shape of a phallus. The name of the site translates to "male genitals". It is considered a site for fertility rites from prehistoric Indonesian peoples.

=== Tongtrong stone ===
The Tongtrong stone is located in the yard of a prayer room, and because it has been removed from its historical context, its exact historical cultural function is unknown. There is debate as to whether it was involved in burial or, because of its shape resembling female genitals, in fertility ceremonies.

== Flora ==
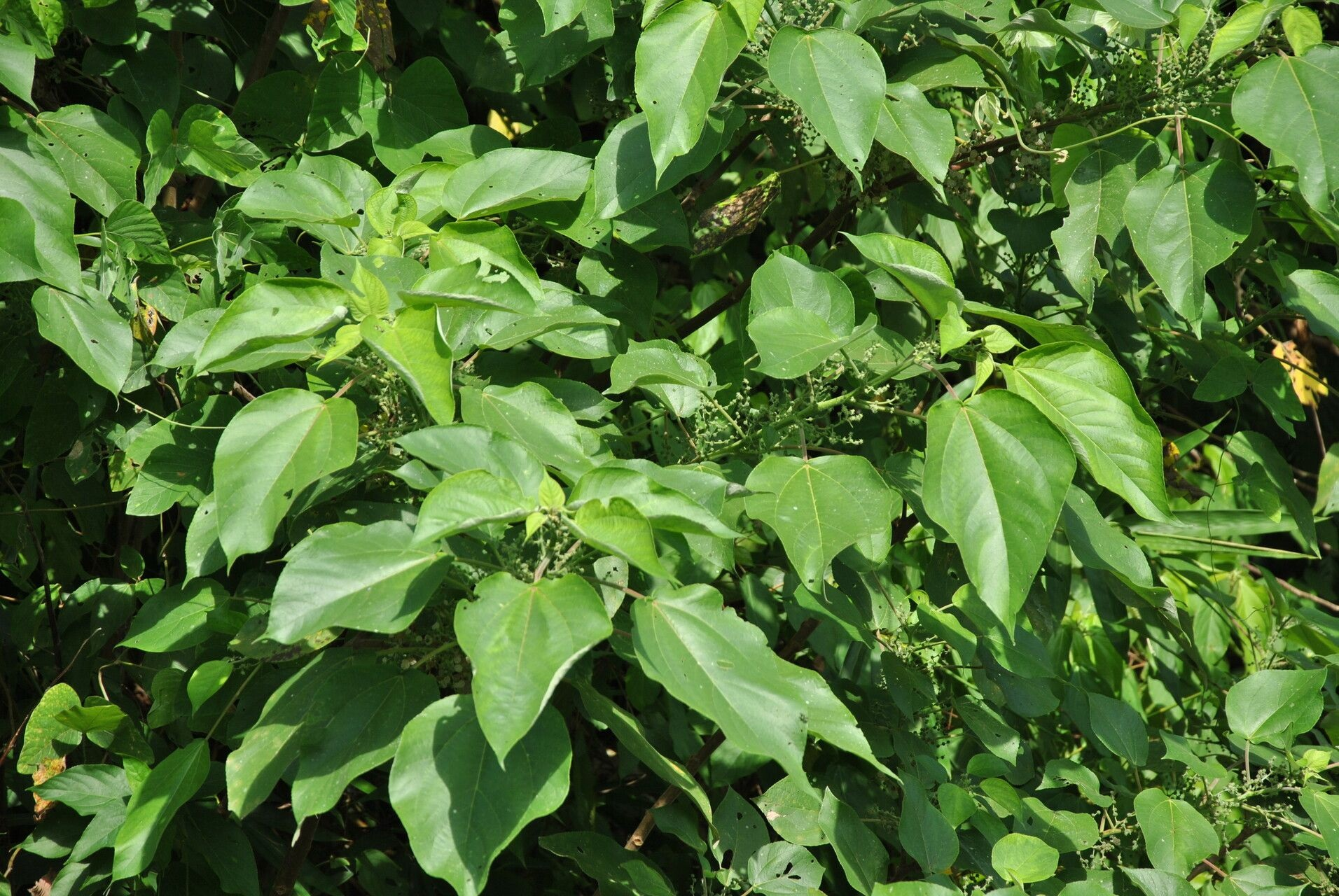
Acalypha caturus, picture taken in Sangihe, Sulawesi at 3.441456°S 125.506783°E

Acalypha caturus [war] was identified growing on the mountain at 1,250 m (4,100 ft).

Actinodaphne procera [war] has been found growing between 400 m (1,300 ft) and 1,400 m (4,600 ft).

A variant of Actephila (Actephila javanica) is thought to grow at approximately 1,000 m (3,300 ft) above sea level. It was observed flowering in December circa 1910.

Alyxia plants have also been recorded in the area, with local wisdom mixing the wilted leaves of the gagan plant (centella asiatica) to create a vermicide for children. A. reinwardtii [ban] is locally called pulasari and is sometimes sold as white cinnamon. Other mixtures containing A. reinwardtii are prepared as treatments for a varied number of medical conditions, from promoting lactation, to use as a diuretic, to a stage in treating smallpox.

Antidesma tetandrum [war] was identified growing at 1,050 m (3,440 ft), blooming in June.

Beilschmiedia madang [war] has been identified growing on the mountain at 1,050 m (3,440 ft).

Bischofia javanica was reported as having been collected on the mountainside circa 1910.

Breynia microphylla [war] has been identified as growing on the mountainside at approximately 1,050 m (3,440 ft).

Bridelia gauca [war] has also been identified at approximately 1,050 m (3,440 ft). B. minutiflora was identified at around 700 m (2,300 ft). B. tomentosa [id] is used in making machete handles and is found growing on the mountainside around 1,050 m (3,440 ft), blooming in June.

Castanea argentea, C. javanica, and C. tungurrut have all been found growing at over 1,000 m (3,300 ft).

Celtis tetrandra was located growing on the mountain at around 1,000 m (3,300 ft).

Cheilosa montana was identified on the mountainside at 1,000 m (3,300 ft) and bloomed in November.

Claoxylon indicum was identified growing at approximately 1,050 m (3,440 ft), blooming in June.

Cryptocarya densiflora [war] has been identified as growing between 650 m (2,130 ft) and 1,500 m (4,900 ft) throughout Java, and was found on both Mount Salak and Mount Pulosari. C. tomentosa [war] was only found to grow in West Java between 700 m (2,300 ft) and 1,500 m (4,900 ft), and was identified on Mt. Gëde, Mt. Karang, and Mt. Pulosari.

Daphniphyllum glaucescens [war] was recorded as growing around 1,375 m (4,511 ft) circa 1910. This is taller than the recorded height of this volcano in 2024.

Some Dissochaeta plants are known to grow from Mount Pulosari to Mount Slamet in Banyumas Regency. Specific species include D. inappendiculata and D. gracilis [war].

Glochidion arboreseens [zh] is the recorded name of a plant found growing on the mountain between 10 m (33 ft) and 200 m (660 ft) above sea level. G. rubrum [war] was found growing nearly at the top of the volcano, at 1,300 m (4,300 ft), and was seen to bloom in June. G. borneense [war] also bloomed in June and was found growing at 1,050 m (3,440 ft). G. kollmannianum was found at 1,000 m (3,300 ft).

Homalanthus populneus, locally known as kareumbi [id], was located growing between 700 m (2,300 ft) and 1,000 m (3,300 ft) on the mountainside and recorded blooming in June.

Laportea stimulans was identified on the mountainside between 10 m (33 ft) and 200 m (660 ft) and was seen blooming in June.

Litsea accedentoides [war] was found growing only on Mount Pulosari at around 1,050 m (3,440 ft). L. acerina and L. polita were found only on the slopes of Mt Pulosari and Mt Karang. L. chrysocoma was found growing above 700 m (2,300 ft) on both Mt Karang and Mt Pulosari. L. ferruginea [war] was found only growing on Mt Pulosari, Mt Salak, and near Takòka. L. resinosa [war] was found on the mountainside between 10 m (33 ft) and 400 m (1,300 ft).

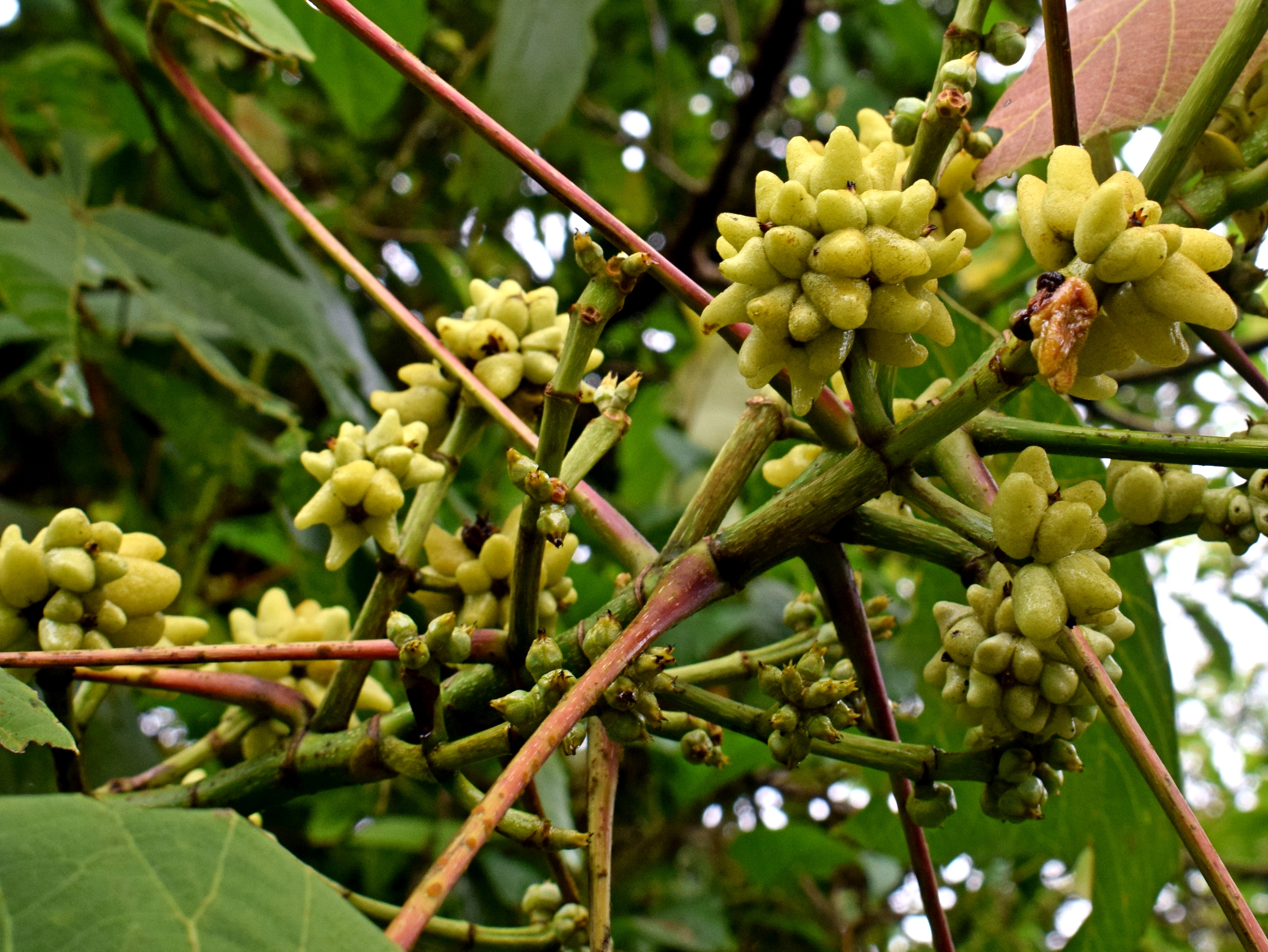
Macaranga triloba, locally called Mahang damar Picture taken at 6.341545°S 106.3813°E

Macaranga rhizinoides, locally called mara tapen [id], grows on the mountainside between 700 m (2,300 ft) and 1,050 m (3,440 ft) above sea level.1,000 m (3,300 ft). M. tanarius, locally called mara [id], was found blooming in July at 1,050 m (3,440 ft). M. triloba, locally called mahang damar [id], was found at approximately 1,050 m (3,440 ft), and is listed as being common among the volcanic mountains of Indonesia.

Mallotus cochinchinensis was discovered blooming in June at 1,050 m (3,440 ft) on the mountain. M. glaberrimus and M. blumeanus [war] were both found at 1,000 m (3,300 ft) and bloomed in November.

Ostodes paniculata [war] was located at 1,050 m (3,440 ft), blooming in June.

Phoebe macrophylla has been found blooming in June at around 1,050 m (3,440 ft).

Villebrunea rubescens was identified as growing on the mountain at 700 m (2,300 ft), with the variant V. rubescens sylvatica growing at 1,000 m (3,300 ft).

== Myths ==
Mount Pulosari has a small role in the Hindu creation myth associated with Mount Karang: in the story, Hanomat, king of the monkeys, carried two large bags of sand to create two islands in the Sunda Strait. When he saw that three islands already existed there, he tore the bags to pieces, creating two growing piles of sand that formed both Karang and Pulosari.

The Banaspati Ghost [id] is a legend of a ghost that roams the mountain and leads climbers astray.

Another local legend tells of buffalo-sized wild boars who roam the slopes of the mountain at night and destroy crops.

== See also ==
- List of volcanoes in Indonesia
- Volcanism of Java
