= Mount Muria =

Dormant volcano on the northern coast of Java

- Moerjo, Moerija
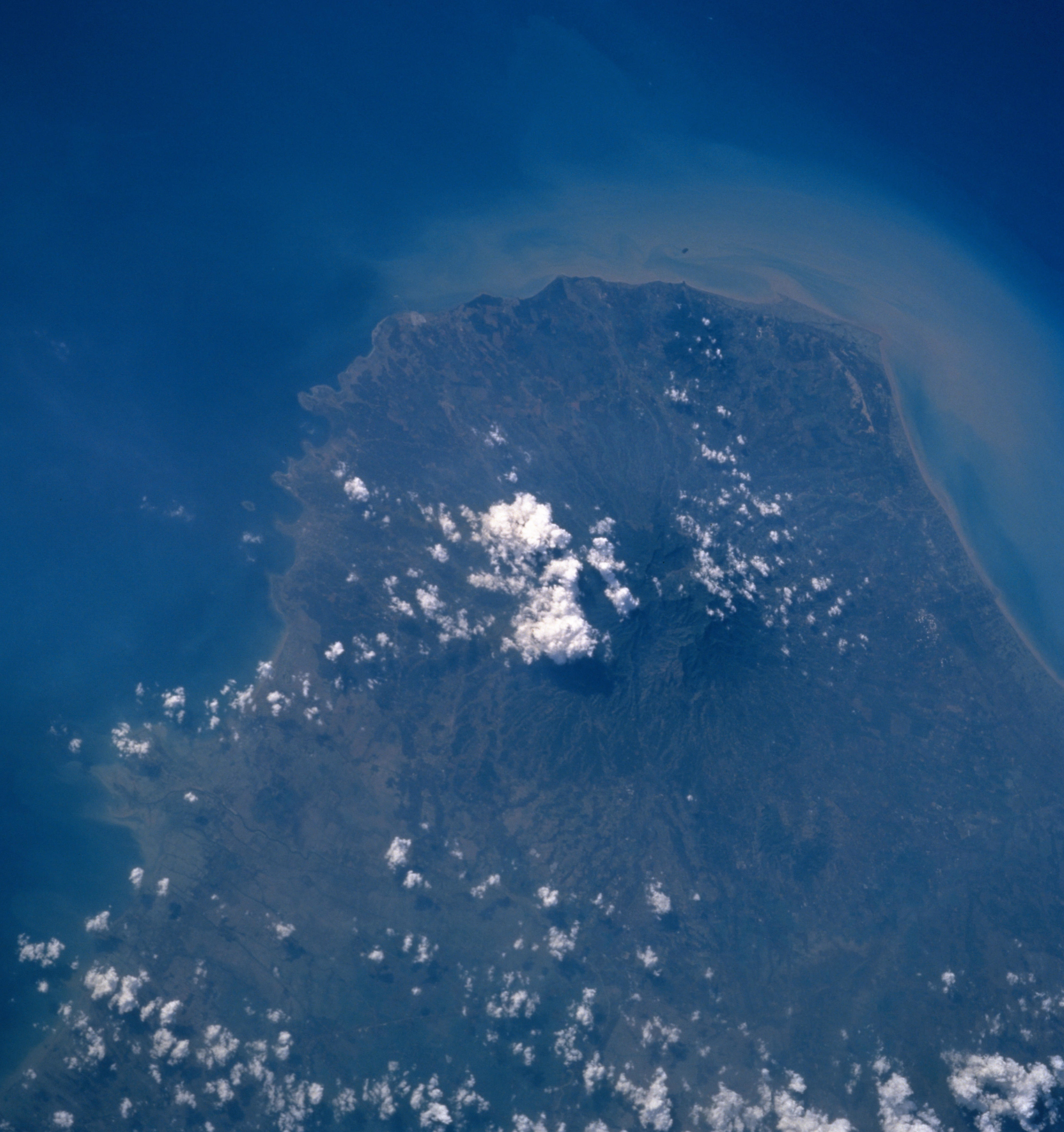
- Mount Muria, photographed in 1999 by the crew of the STS-93 mission

Highest point
- Elevation: 1,602 m (5,256 ft)
- Prominence: 1,595 m (5,233 ft)
- Listing: Ribu
- Coordinates: 6.616667°S 110.883333°E

Geography
- Location within Java Location within Indonesia
- Location: Jepara Regency; Kudus Regency; Pati Regency
- Country: Indonesia

Geology
- Mountain type: Stratovolcano
- Volcanic arc: Sunda Arc
- Last eruption: 160 BCE

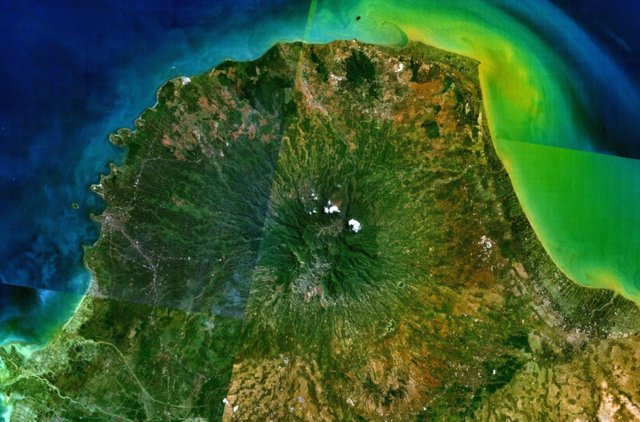
Muria stratovolcano forms the broad Muria Peninsula along the northern coast of central Java in this NASA Landsat mosaic (with north to the top). This 1625-m-high volcano lies well north of the main volcanic chain in Java. It is largely Pleistocene in age and displays deeply eroded flanks. The summit is cut by several large N-S-trending craters, some containing lava domes. The most recent eruptive activity at Muria produced three maars on the SE and NE flanks and a lava flow from a SE-flank vent that entered one of the maars.

Mount Muria or Gunung Muria is a dormant stratovolcano on the north coast of Central Java, Indonesia, about 66 km north of Semarang city. It is located in three Regencies: Jepara on the west, Kudus on the south, and Pati on the east. Some sources state the mountain has a height of 1602 m, some state 1625 m.

Mount Muria was once an island, separated from Java by the Muria Strait. The strait was one of the spice trade routes connecting the Middle East with Maluku and was probably traveled by Tomé Pires on his voyage to Java. The strait closed around 1657.

In 1979, the northern side of the mountain was chosen by the National Nuclear Energy Agency (BATAN) [id] as a location for the construction of a nuclear power plant, with the understanding that the risk of earthquakes and volcanic eruptions was small compared to other parts of Java and Bali. The plant's placement also took into consideration electricity consumption in Central Java. Earthquakes that rocked Mount Muria in the 2010s put an end to the development plan.

The mountain last erupted in 160 BCE.

== Geology ==
Mount Muria is part of the Sunda Arc, which is associated with the subduction of the Indian Plate beneath the Eurasian Plate. Lavas found here have unusually high potassium contents. Field mapping, thin-section petrography, and XRF major-element data show two main rock groups are found:

(1) pyroxene-rich basaltic-andesite (augite ± olivine, minor anorthite/foid)

(2) leucite-rich trachyte/phonolite (aegirine with biotite and hornblende). Major-element chemistry spans high-K (K2O ≈ 4–5.9 wt%) to very high-K (≈ 6–8.24 wt%), with two silica groupings of ~46–50 wt% and ~57–64 wt% SiO2.

TAS (Total Alkali Silica) classifications include tephrite, phonolite, and trachyte. Stratigraphically, calcareous sediments of the Bulu Formation. These underlie trachyandesite, while pumice-rich volcanic breccia and tuff of the Ujungwatu Formation. Below this layer is basanite–tephrite at Genuk and basanite–tephrite–phonolite at Patiayam. The volcanic chemistry includes lavas, breccias, tuffs, dikes, craters, and multiple maars. There were two magmatic series through time: an older high-K to very high-K (alkaline, leucite-bearing) suite, and a younger medium-K calc-alkaline suite.

Mount Muria is historically comparable to Mount Genuk [id], another volcano on the Muria peninsula, located in Donorojo [id]: both produce coherent lava, and have both lava plugs and domes as well as maars at the foot of each volcano and in the surrounding plains. Volcanic breccias, lapilli and tuff can also be found around the mountain, with densities around 2.4g/cm^{3}.

== Abandoned nuclear project ==
From 1976 to 2015 there was a plan to build a nuclear power plant on Mount Muria. Construction was scheduled to begin in 1997 but halted due to the 1997 Asian financial crisis. In 2007, construction was scheduled to begin again but was halted by a sudden outbreak of anti-nuclear protests. After the protests continued for several months, the local branch of Nahdlatul Ulama denounced the project to build on the sacred mountain. They declared that the government's plan was haram because it would force Indonesia to import foreign uranium, hire foreign experts to manage the plant, and pay the costs to dismantle the plant and store the nuclear waste indefinitely. The national chairman of NU refused to support the local decision, but said that NU would not overrule a finding by a local branch about matters exclusively pertaining to the local branch.

Following the Fukushima Daiichi nuclear disaster, the Indonesian government suspended the project. In 2015 the project was permanently halted after nearly 40 years of planning. Indonesia no longer has active nuclear projects.

== See also ==
- List of ultras of the Malay Archipelago
- List of volcanoes in Indonesia
- Volcanism of Java
- Religion in Indonesia
- Argo Muria
