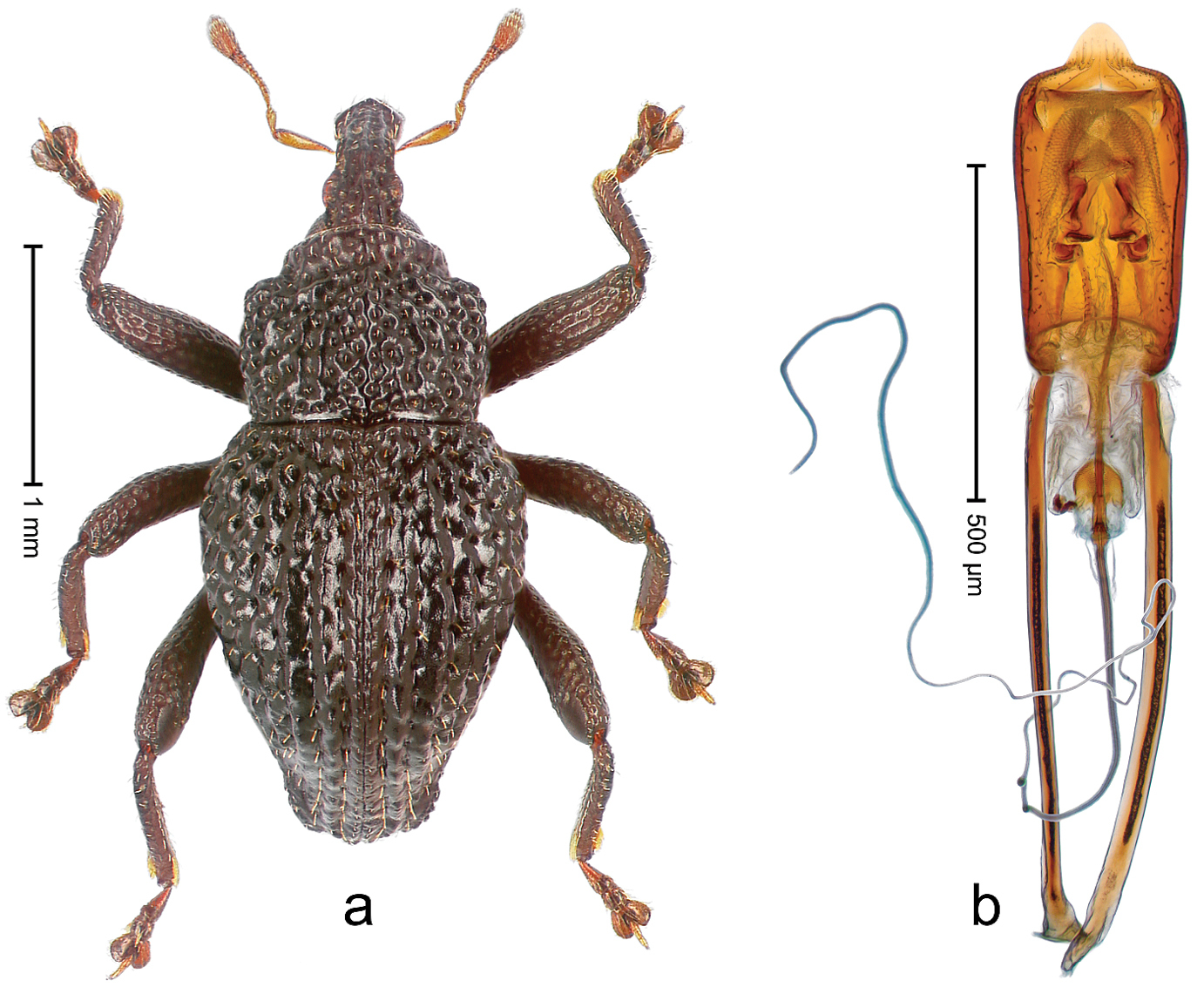

Scientific classification
- Kingdom: Animalia
- Phylum: Arthropoda
- Clade: Pancrustacea
- Class: Insecta
- Order: Coleoptera
- Suborder: Polyphaga
- Infraorder: Cucujiformia
- Family: Curculionidae
- Genus: Trigonopterus
- Species: T. allopatricus

Binomial name
- Trigonopterus allopatricus Riedel, 2014

= Trigonopterus allopatricus =

Species of beetle

Trigonopterus allopatricus is a species of flightless weevil in the genus Trigonopterus from Indonesia. The species was described in 2014. The beetle is 2.23–2.75 mm long. It has a reddish-brown head and legs, while the rest of the body is black. Endemic to West Java, where it is known from several mountains at elevations of 1,560–2,050 m (5,120–6,730 ft).

== Taxonomy ==
Trigonopterus allopatricus was described by the entomologist Alexander Riedel in 2014 on the basis of an adult male specimen collected from Mount Cakrabuana on the island of Java in Indonesia. The specific epithet is derived from Greek allos, meaning "other", and Latin patria, meaning "homeland". The name refers to the species' fragmented distribution.

== Description ==
The beetle is 2.23–2.75 mm long. It has a reddish-brown head and legs, while the rest of the body is black. The body is elongated, with a pronounced narrowing between the pronotum and elytron when viewed from above, and a distinct constriction visible in profile. The rostrum is rough and densely punctured, featuring a central ridge and two irregular submedian ridges. The epistome has a faint, angled transverse ridge.

The pronotum projects sharply at the front sides and narrows clearly before the tip. Its surface is rough, with each puncture bearing an erect hair; the spaces between punctures are finely textured, and a central ridge runs along the middle. The elytra have deeply impressed striae, each lined with suberect bristles. The intervals are unevenly raised, almost forming small bumps, and are smooth and faintly textured. Interval 7 is swollen near the tip and slightly projects outward. The femora are edentate. The metafemur has a stridulatory patch near the tip and a transverse ridge. The dorsal edge of the tibiae has a sharp angle near the base that forms a pointed tooth. The fifth abdominal segment is flat, densely punctured, and covered with hairs.

The penis is strongly curved in profile, slender with nearly parallel sides from above, and ends in a central, triangular extension. The transfer apparatus is flagelliform and 1.2 times the length of the penis body, but can be as long as 1.5 times the length of the body. The apodemes are 2.2 times as long as the body, and the ductus ejaculatorius lacks a bulbus.

The sutural interval is usually black but can be reddish-brown in some individuals. In females, the rostrum has pairs of lateral and submedian grooves on the upper surface, and the epistome is simple. The elytral apex in females shows more noticeable projections of interval 7 and the sutural interval.

== Distribution ==
Trigonopterus allopatricus is endemic to the Indonesian province of West Java, where it is known from Mount Bukittinggul, Mount Cakrabuana, Mount Cikuray, Mount Payung, Mount Sawal, Talagabodas, and Mount Tikukur. It has been recorded from elevations of 1,560–2,050 m (5,120–6,730 ft).
