= Mount Patuha =

Twin Stratovolcano in West Java

- Location within Java

Highest point
- Elevation: 2,434 m (7,986 ft)
- Listing: Ribu
- Coordinates: 07°09′37″S 107°24′00″E

Geography
- Location: Java, Indonesia

Geology
- Mountain type: Stratovolcano
- Volcanic arc: Sunda Arc

Mount Patuha is a twin stratovolcano about 50 km to the southwest of Bandung in West Java, Indonesia. It is located in the Bandung District of West Java. It is one of numerous volcanoes in this area; others in the region include Mount Malabar, Mount Wayang, and Mount Papandayan (placed on a warning alert in August 2011).

The summit of Mt Patuha contains two volcanic craters 600 m apart. The northwest crater is dry but the southeast one has a greenish-white crater lake called Kawah Putih (or white crater). There was formerly a sulfur mine at Kawah Putih although production has now ceased. No detailed history of eruptions is known for Mount Patuha.

There are also potential sites for geothermal power near Mt Patuha which are being considered for development as sites for generation plants to feed the national electricity grid. State-owned geothermal power producer PT Geo Dipa Energi has been involved in recent plans to invest in a project in the Mt Patuha area.

== Kawah Putih ==
This crater contains a striking lake. The area was opened in 1987 as a tourist spot and attracts a considerable number of visitors. There is a 5-kilometer access road from the main road (which, in turn, is the main road south from Bandung through the town of Ciwidey). The surface of the lake changes colour from blueish green to whitish green depending on the concentration of sulphur and the weather. At full moon, fluorescent green light appears from the (lake) crater. Pre-wedding pictures are frequently taken here due to the magnificent scenery.

Kawah Putih lake (7.10° S 107.24° E) is one of the two craters which make up Mount Patuha, an andesitic stratovolcano (a "composite" volcano).[2] Mt Patuha is one of numerous volcanoes in Java. Kawah Putih crater lake itself represents a relatively stable volcanic system with no records of significant activity since around 1600.

== See also ==
- List of volcanoes in Indonesia
