= Mount Kendang =

Stratovolcano in West Java, Indonesia

- Location within Java Location within Indonesia

Highest point
- Elevation: 2,608 m (8,556 ft)
- Coordinates: 7.24°S 107.70°E

Geography
- Location: Java, Indonesia

Geology
- Rock age: Quaternary
- Mountain type: Stratovolcano
- Volcanic arc: Sunda Arc
- Last eruption: Unknown

Mount Kendang is a stratovolcano located in the border between Kertasari Subdistrict, Bandung Regency and Pasirwangi Subdistrict, Garut Regency, West Java, Indonesia. It contains four fumarole fields including Kawah Manuk, a broad, 2.75 km wide crater. Sulfur sublimation, mud pots and hot springs are found in the volcano.

== See also ==
- List of volcanoes in Indonesia
- Volcanism of Java
