= Kendeng =

Stratovolcano in West Java, Indonesia

Mount Kedeng
- Location within Java Location within Indonesia

Highest point
- Elevation: 1,732 m (5,682 ft)
- Coordinates: 6.768°S 106.526°E

Geography
- Location: Cianjur Regency; Bandung Regency
- Country: Indonesia
- Region: West Java

Geology
- Rock age: Pleistocene
- Mountain type: Stratovolcano
- Last eruption: Pleistocene

Kedeng is a 1,732 m (5,682 ft) high stratovolcano on western Java, Indonesia. The volcano comprises andesites and andesitic breccias which date back to the Pleistocene. It was active between 1.8 million and 700 thousand years ago. The volcano presently does not display any surface activity, though the caldera is rounded in shape, indicating previous violent eruptions.

There are several mountains in Indonesia with the name Kedeng. This particular mountain is located to the west of Rancabali [id] in Bandung Regency and to the east of Sukanagara [id] in Cianjur Regency.

== See also ==
- List of volcanoes in Indonesia
- Volcanism of Java
