= Mount Papandayan =

Complex stratovolcano in Java, Indonesia

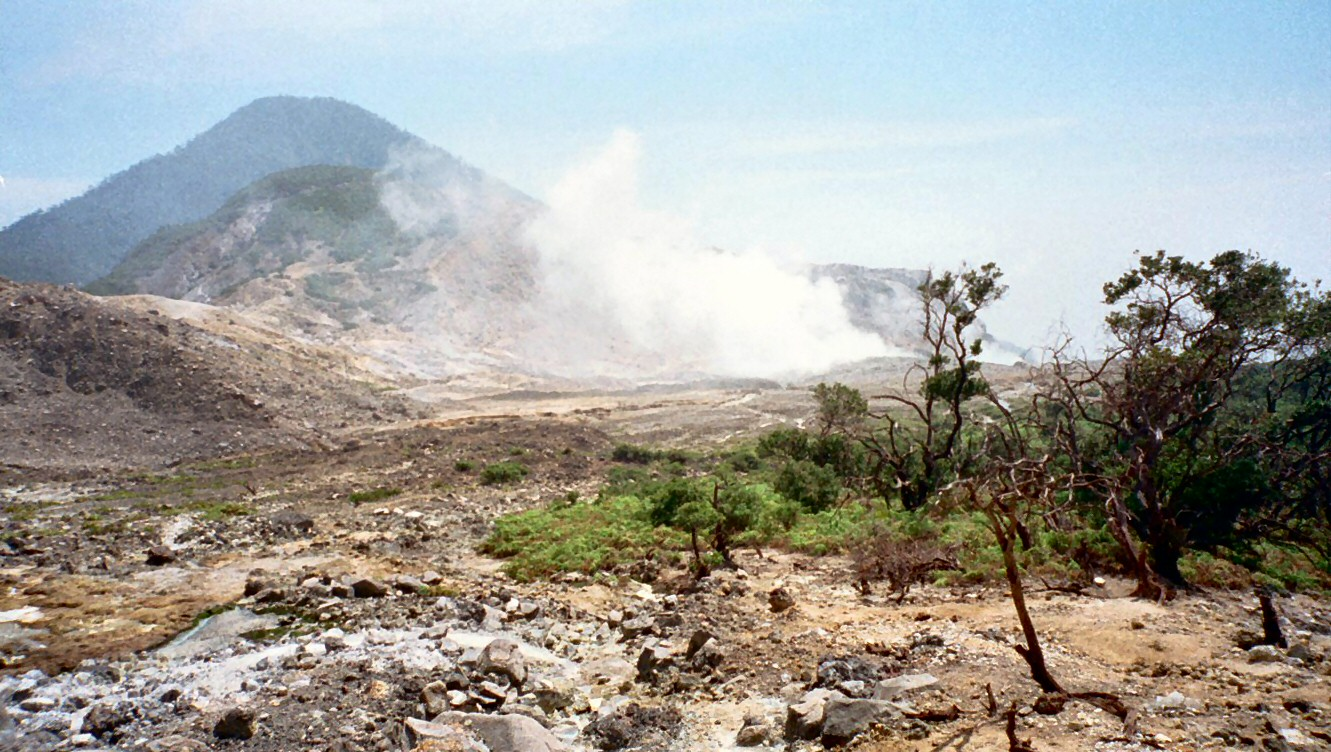

Highest point
- Listing: Ribu
- Coordinates: 7°19′S 107°44′E

Geography
- Location within Java
- Location: Garut, West Java, Indonesia

Geology
- Mountain type: Stratovolcanoes
- Volcanic arc: Sunda Arc
- Last eruption: November to December 2002

Video of volcanic activity at Mount Papandayan

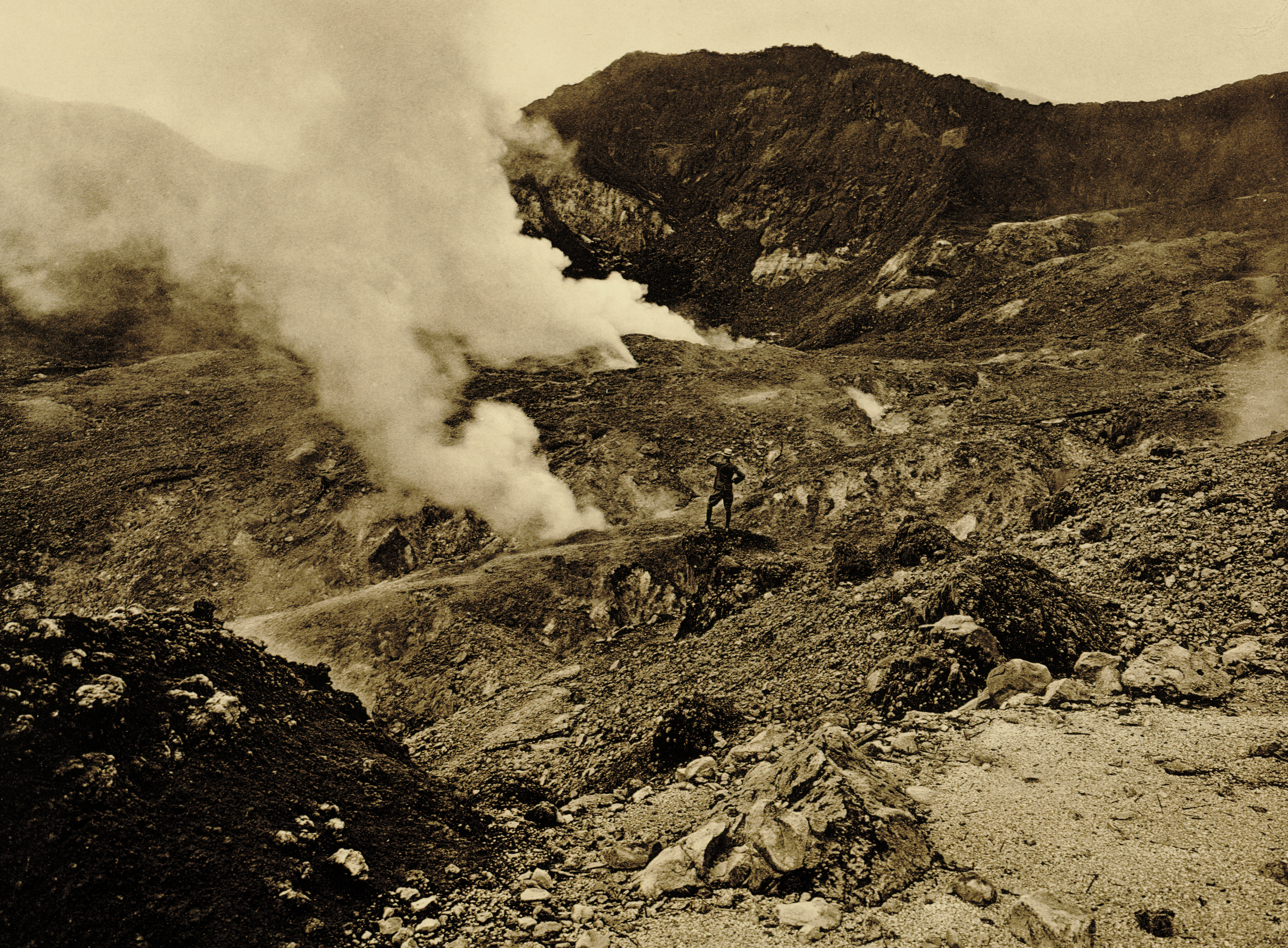
George P. Lewis: Fumaroles at Mount Papandayan, 1920

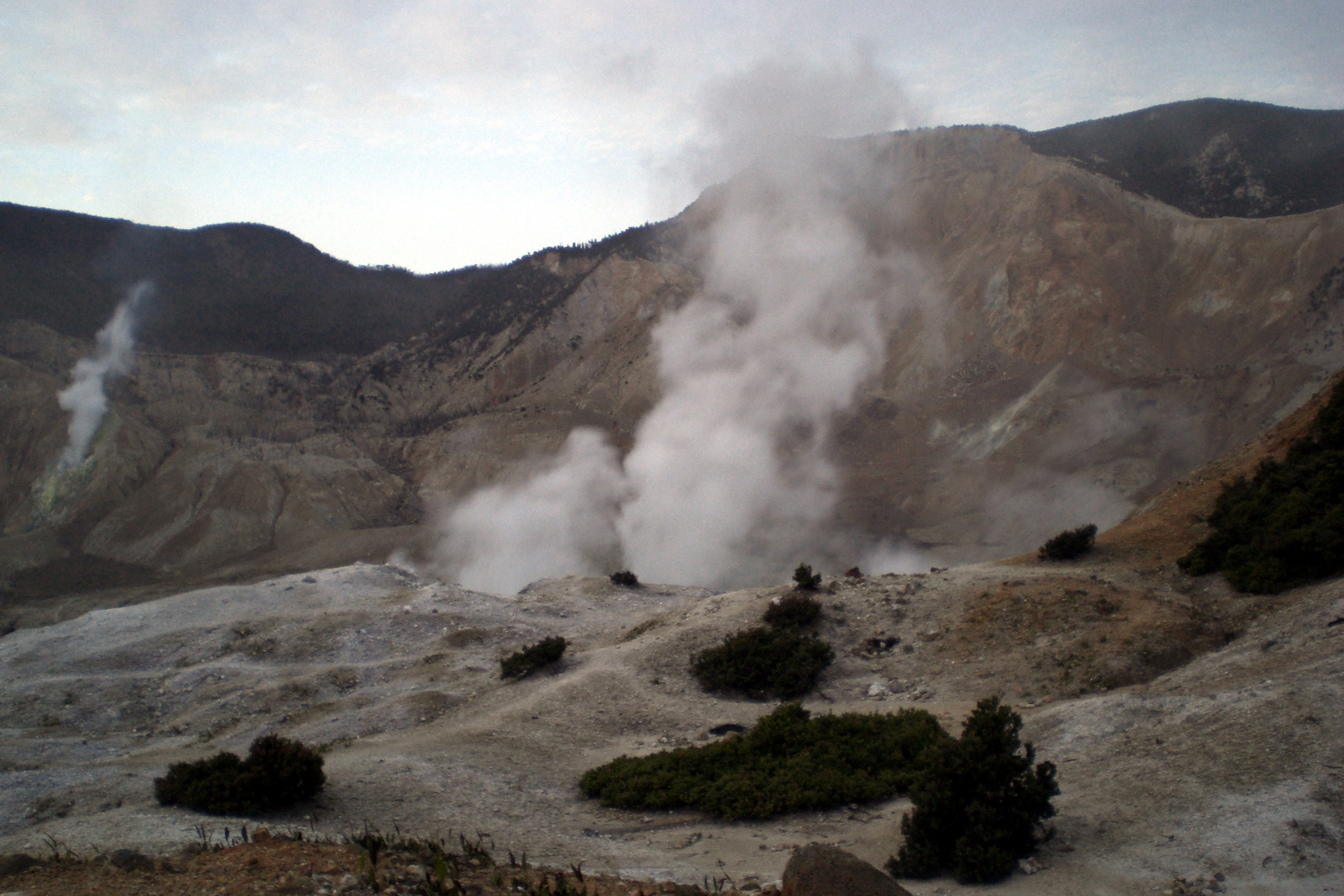
Fumaroles at Papandayan

Mount Papandayan is a complex stratovolcano, located in Garut Regency, to the southeast of the city of Bandung in West Java, Indonesia. It is about 15 kilometres (9.3 mi) to the southwest of the town of Garut. At the summit, there are four large craters which contain active fumarole fields. An eruption in 1772 caused the northeast flank to collapse producing a catastrophic debris avalanche that destroyed 40 villages and killed nearly 3,000 people. The eruption truncated the volcano into a broad shape with two peaks and a flat area 1.1 km wide with Alun-Alun crater in the middle, making the mountain appear as a twin volcano; one of the peaks is called Papandayan and the other Mount Puntang.

Since 1772, only small phreatic eruptions were recorded before an explosive eruption that began in November 2002. More recently, the volcano has been quite active. On 13 August 2011 the volcano's early warning status was lifted from Level II, "Vigilant" (Indonesian: Waspada) to Level III, "Alert" (Siaga) following the swarm of long-period events, the increase of volcano tectonic earthquake rate, and an extremely high percentage (100%) of measured carbon dioxide gas in the ground at the summit crater. People, including tourists, were urged to remain at least 2 kilometres (1.2 mi) from the yellow craters on the 2,665-metre-high (8,743 ft) Mount Papandayan. On Friday 2 September 2011, the Indonesian Volcanology and Geophysical Disaster Mitigation Center reported that numerous shallow volcanic earthquakes had been recorded along with other indications of volcanic activity. A spokesperson for the Indonesian National Disaster Management Agency noted that if Mt Papandayan erupted, over 170,000 people living in five nearby subdistricts (kecamatan) and in twenty villages could be affected. Of the people likely to be affected, it was expected that perhaps as many as 11,500 people might need to be evacuated.

== Volcanism ==
Mount Papandayan is a large composite volcano. It is constructed of alternating layers of lava and ash, and other fragmental volcanic rock debris formed by explosive eruptions over the past several hundred years. A large horseshoe-shape crater extended to the northeast resulting in an avalanche deposit consisted of intermixed volcanic debris and alternated rocks, Kawah Manuk and many other with solfataras emitting smoke and hot fumes from its inner sides.

== Tourism ==
The Mount Papandayan area is a popular tourist site. Tourists can walk across the crater and view phenomena such as bubbling mud pools, steam vents, and sulfur deposits. Papandayan Crater (Kawah Papandayan), a bubbling yellow crater, is a popular sight. There are various other volcanic craters in the area to the south of Bandung as well. Another volcanic crater with easy access in the same region is Kawah Putih; it is in the nearby Bandung District to the west of Mt Papandayan.

Above the crater is an elfin forest and several meadows with Javanese Edelweiss.

== See also ==
- List of volcanoes in Indonesia
- Volcanism of Java
- Papandayan (train)
