= Mount Lurus =

Complex stratovolcano in Java, Indonesia

- Location within Java Location within Indonesia

Highest point
- Elevation: 539 m (1,768 ft)
- Coordinates: 7.73°S 113.58°E

Geography
- Location: Java, Indonesia

Geology
- Mountain type: Complex volcano
- Volcanic arc: Sunda Arc
- Last eruption: Pleistocene age

Mount Lurus is a complex volcano located along the northern coast of East Java, Indonesia. The volcano has produced leucite-bearing rocks with andesitic and trachytic composition.

== See also ==
- List of volcanoes in Indonesia
