= Karaha Crater =

Fumarole in West Java

- Location within Java Location within Indonesia

Highest point
- Elevation: 1,155 m (3,789 ft)
- Coordinates: 7.12°S 108.08°E

Geography
- Location: West Java, Indonesia

Geology
- Rock age: Quaternary
- Mountain type: fumarole
- Volcanic arc: Sunda Arc

Karaha Crater or Kawah Karaha is a fumarole field in Java, Indonesia. It is an eroded crater from the last eruption in which its date is unknown. The field covers 250 × 80 m area and contains sulfur deposit.

== See also ==
- List of volcanoes in Indonesia
