= Malang Plain =

Group of volcanic landforms in East Java

- Malang Plain satellite image

Highest point
- Elevation: 680 m (2,230 ft)
- Coordinates: 8°01′S 112°41′E

Geography
- Location within Java Location within Indonesia
- Location: Java, Indonesia

Geology
- Rock age: Holocene
- Mountain type: Maar
- Volcanic arc: Sunda Arc

Malang Plain is a group of nine ash cones, maars and volcanic plugs. It is located around the city of Malang, from southeast to northeast, in East Java, Indonesia. Some of the cones might be parasitic cones from Tengger caldera complex.

== See also ==
- List of volcanoes in Indonesia
