= Talagabodas =

Stratovolcano in western Java, Indonesia

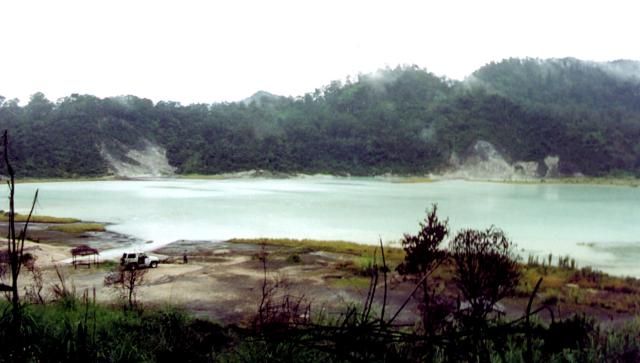
- The crater of Talagabodas

Highest point
- Elevation: 2,201 m (7,221 ft)
- Coordinates: 7.208°S 108.07°E

Geography
- Location within Java Location within Indonesia
- Location: West Java, Indonesia

Geology
- Rock age: Quaternary
- Mountain type: Stratovolcano
- Volcanic arc: Sunda Arc

Mount Talagabodas or Mount Telagabodas (which means Mount of White Lake (refer to white crater lake) in Sundanese) is a stratovolcano in West Java, Indonesia. The volcano is about 25 km to the east of the town of Garut and is built up of andesitic lavas and pyroclastics. Fumaroles, mud pots and hot springs are found around the crater lake. Changes of the lake color occurred in 1913 and 1921. The diameter of crater lake is less than 2 km and lies at an altitude of 1,720 m or 1,020 m above Garut plains.

Mt Talagabodas is just north of Galunggung volcano which attracted global attention following an eruption in 1982 that, amongst other things, caused widely reported disruption to international air travel and an emergency for British Airways Flight 9 travelling from Kuala Lumpur to Perth in June 1982.

== See also ==
- List of volcanoes in Indonesia
- Cimanuk
- Citanduy
- Tasikmalaya
