= Kawah Putih =

Crater lake in Indonesia

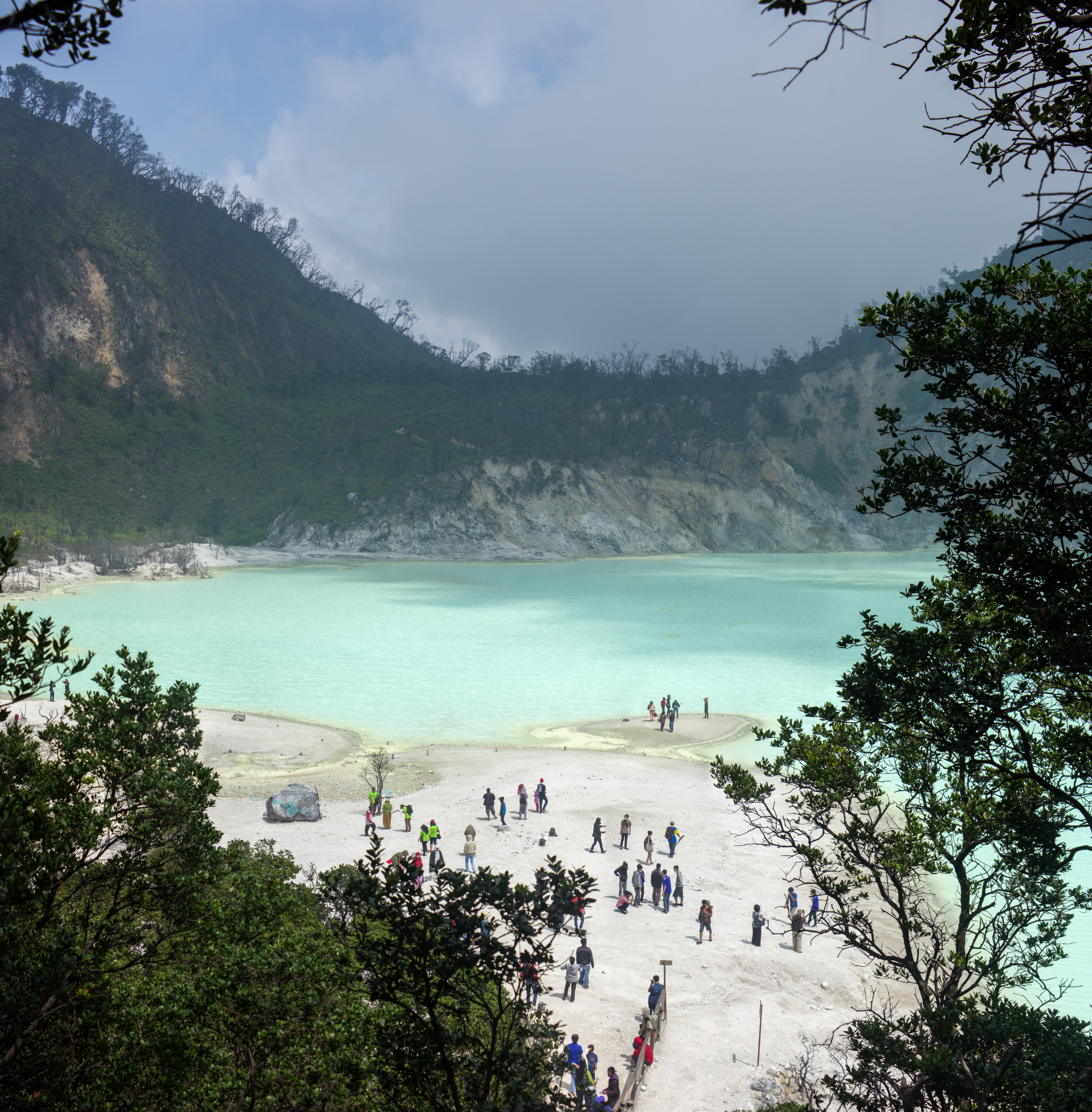
- Kawah Putih

- Location within Indonesia
- Location: West Java, Indonesia
- Coordinates: 7°10′S 107°24′E
- Type: Volcanic crater lake
- Part of: Citarum Basin
- Basin countries: Indonesia

Kawah Putih (Sundanese: ᮊᮝᮂ ᮕᮥᮒᮤᮂ) (English: White Crater) is a crater lake and tourist spot in a volcanic crater about 50 kilometres (31 mi) south of Bandung, West Java, Indonesia.

Kawah Putih Lake (7.10° S 107.24° E) is one of the two craters that make up Mount Patuha, an andesitic stratovolcano (a "composite" volcano). Mount Patuha is one of numerous volcanoes in Java. Kawah Putih Crater Lake itself represents a relatively stable volcanic system with no record of significant activity since around 1600.

The Kawah Putih site was opened to visitors in 1987. The lake is 2,430 metres (7,970 ft) above sea level, where temperatures are frequently around 10 °C (50 °F). This makes a brisk change from the humidity of the north Java plain and the capital city of Jakarta. Kawah Putih is a sizeable highly acid lake (pH 0.5-1.3) that changes colour from bluish to whitish green, or brown, depending on the concentration of sulfur and the temperature or the oxidation state. The sand and rocks surrounding the lake have been also leached into whitish colours through interaction with the acidic lake waters (with possible mineral precipitation as well).

== History ==
The lake is said to have been first documented in the Western world in 1837 by Dr Franz Wilhelm Junghuhn, a German botanist who carried out a considerable amount of research in Indonesia until his death in Lembang, just north of Bandung, in 1864. At the time, there were various local stories about the history of the area. Birds were said to be reluctant to fly near the region and villagers in the area tended to regard the forest around the lake as eerie and somewhat mysterious. These stories prompted Dr Junghuhn to investigate. He discovered Kawah Putih. There was formerly a sulfur mine at the crater although production has now ceased. A sulfur plant known as the Zwavel Ontgining Kawah Putih was first established near the lake during the period of Dutch rule in Java. The plant was later taken over during World War II by the Japanese military and operated under the name Kawah Putih Kenzanka Yokoya Ciwidey. Entry points to various tunnels which represent the remnants of these mining activities can be seen at several points around the current site.

Over a century after Franz Wilhelm Junghuhn first saw the lake, in 1991 the Indonesian state-owned forestry firm Perhutani Unit III Jawa Barat dan Banten (Forestry Unit No III for West Java and Banten) began to develop the site as a tourist spot.

== The site ==
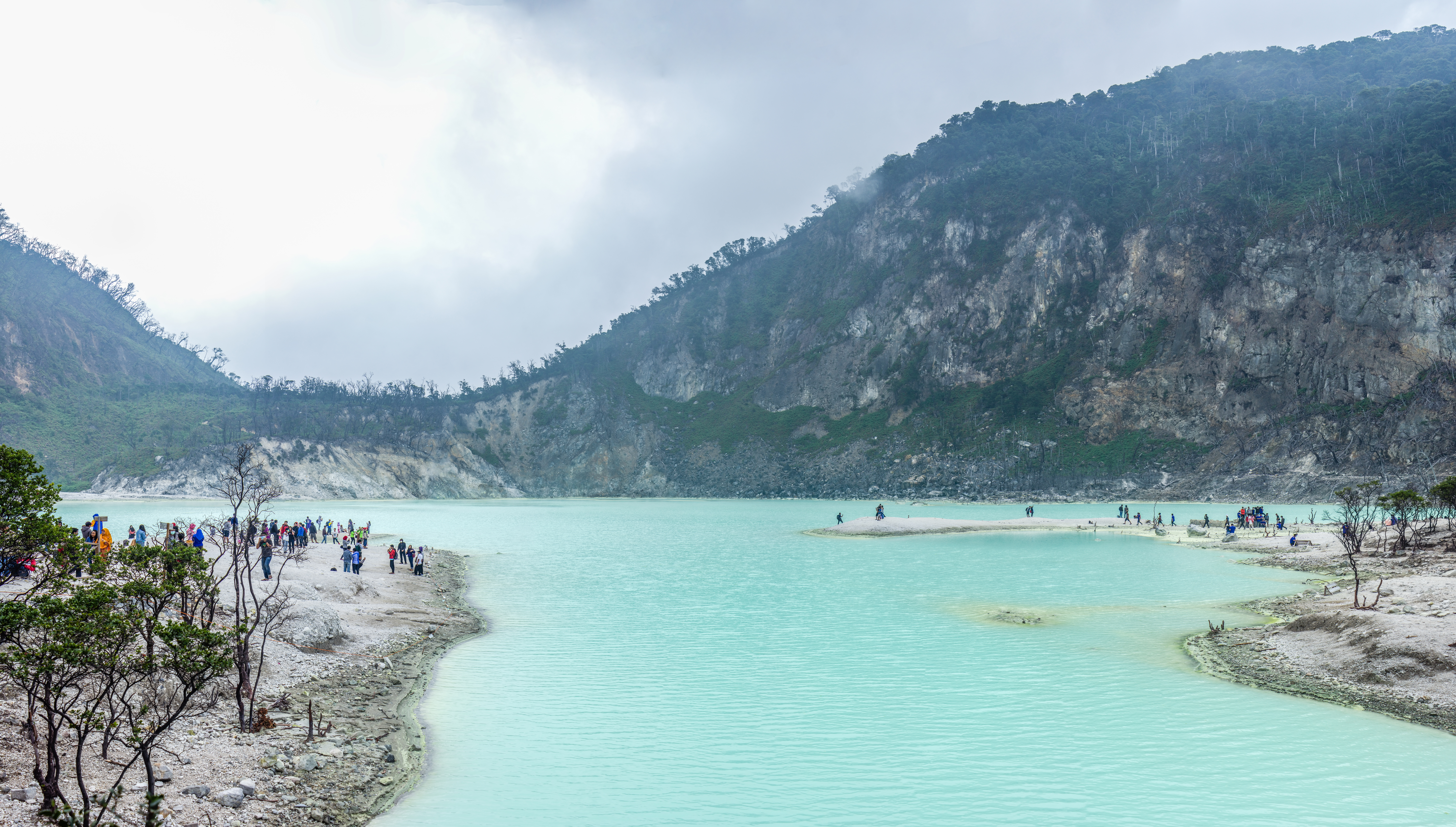
View of Kawah Putih from the crater floor

The surrounding area is heavily forested. There is a pathway down to the lake which is surrounded by the high walls of the crater nestling into the side of Mount Patuha. The smell of sulfur is strong because there is a good deal of steam and sulfurous gas bubbling from the lake. There are tracks around the lake and through the nearby forest including to the peak of Mount Patuha. Visitors can walk around the crater area or sit in the various shelters. Local plants not widely found in lower altitudes in Java include Javanese Edelweiss and Cantigy (Vaccinium varingifolium). Animals and birds that may be spotted include eagles, owls, monkeys, mouse deer, and forest pigs. Panthers, leopards, and pythons have also sometimes been seen in the nearby forest.

A range of simple facilities exists near the lake. There is ample parking and public toilets. Entrepreneurial vendors sell trinkets and food. The site is well-signposted. Local farmers often take the opportunity to sell strawberries (widely grown in the area), steamed corn, and various other items such as pumpkin seeds (pepita).

Kawah Putih and the surrounding area (where there are resort facilities such as hot spas) is a popular spot for people from Bandung. On weekends and holidays, quite large numbers of Indonesian tourists visit Kawah Putih. The site is so far less well known to international tourists. According to Perhutani staff at the site, up to 10,000 people might visit on busy holidays and the total number of visitors is perhaps 300,000 per year.

== Access ==
Access is gained from the left of the main road travelling south by entering the park and proceeding along a 5 km access road. Travel time from the centre of Bandung, depending on traffic in and around Bandung, is perhaps two hours. Visitors typically leave their vehicles in a car park at the entry to the site and catch one of the regular mini shuttle buses (leaving every five minutes or so) for the 5 km to the crater.

The main road is the busy road south from Bandung through the town of Soreang, the capital of the Bandung District, continuing down through the crowded Pasir Jambu township. Minibuses ply the route southwards from Bandung and, depending on traffic, can take up to two hours to reach the entrance to the Kawah Putih area.

== Gallery ==
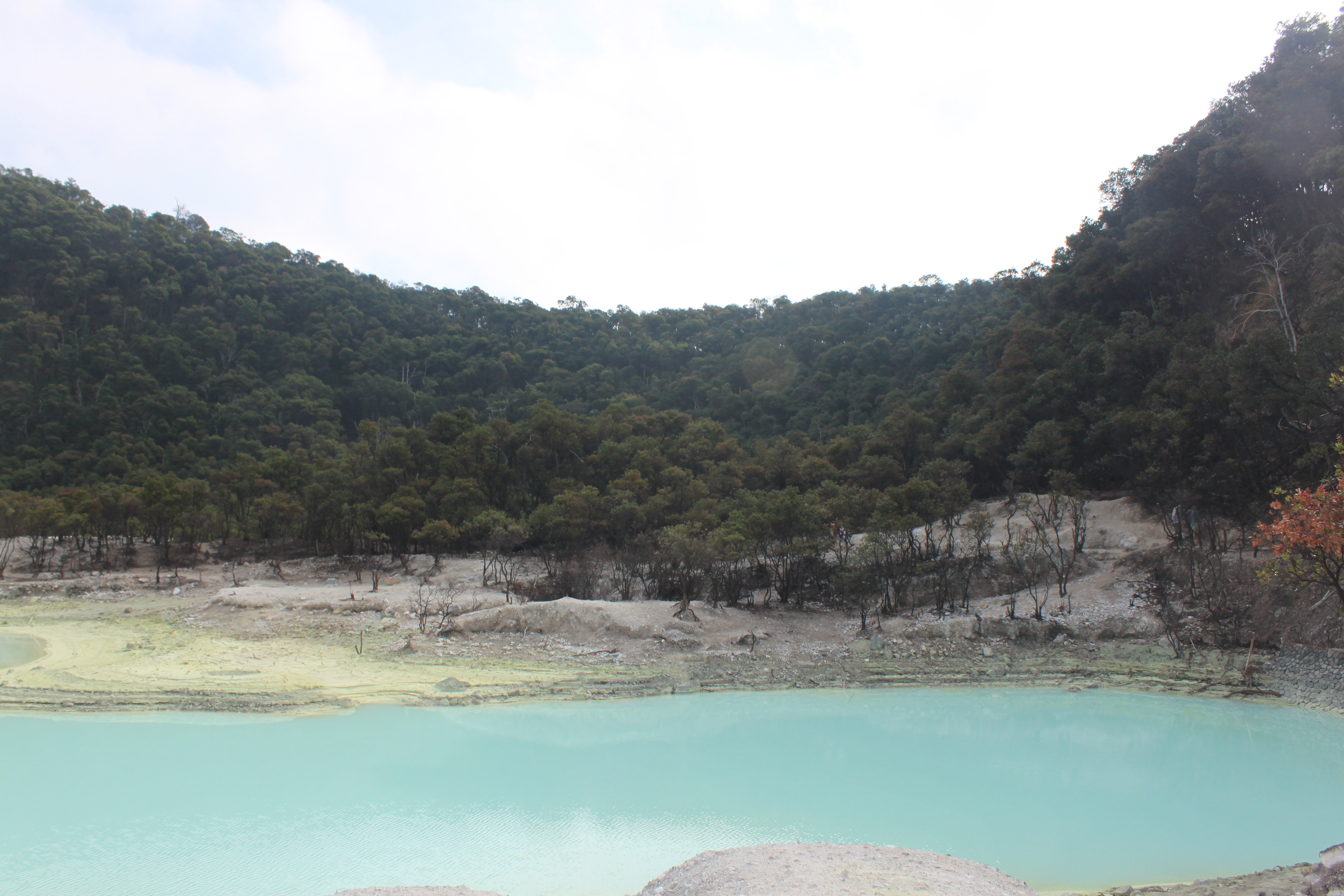

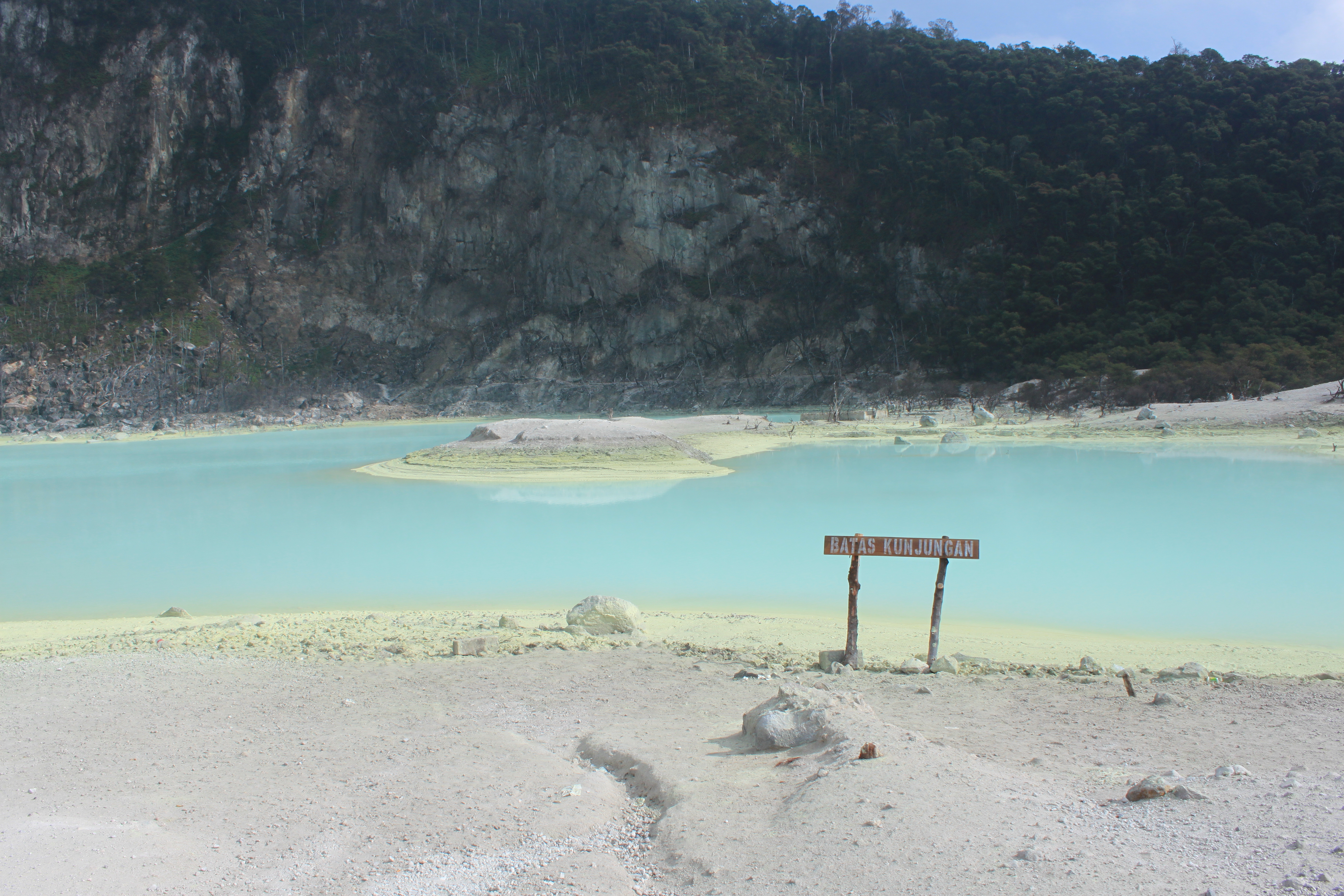

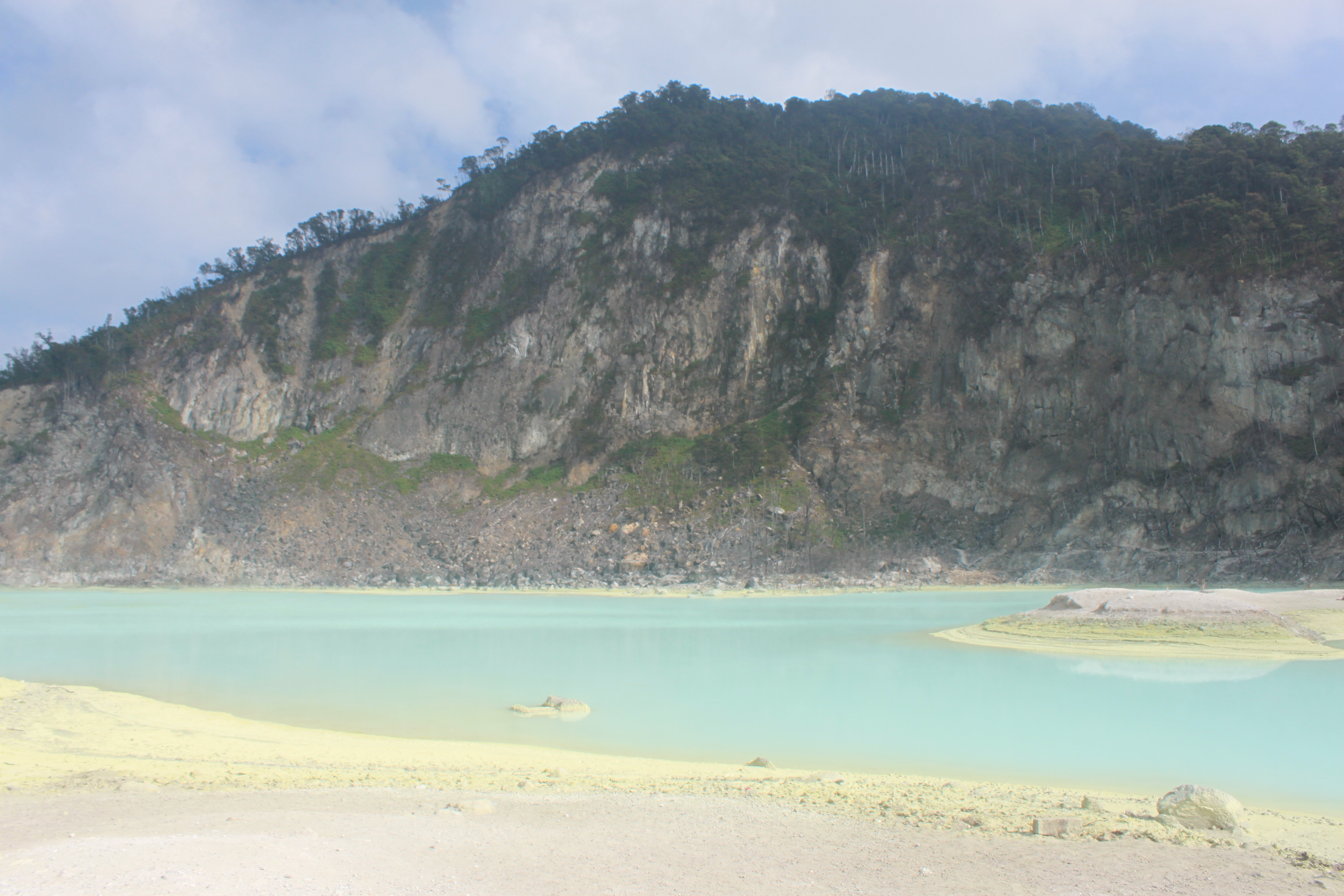

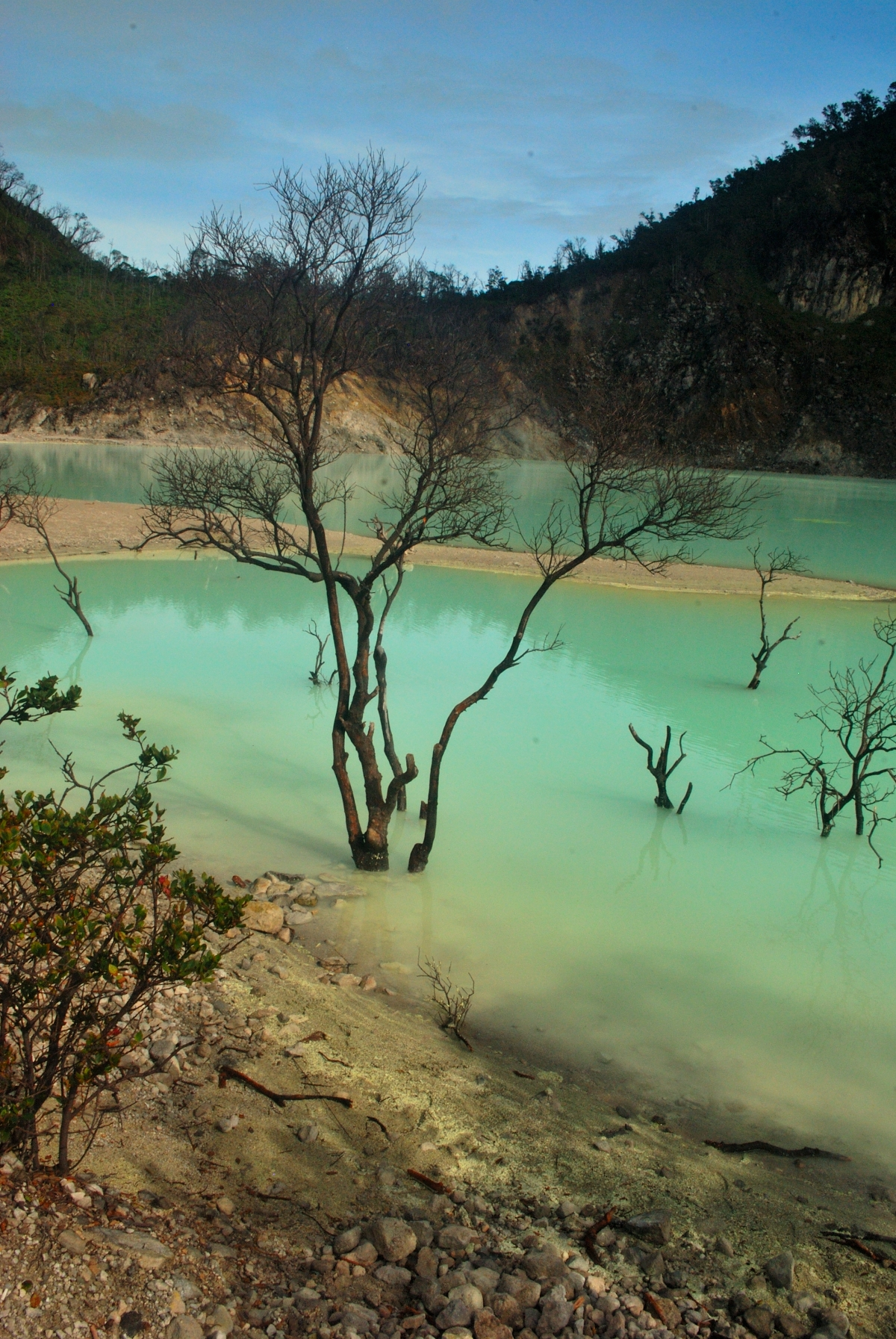
Dead trees on the shore of Kawah Putih

== See also ==
- List of drainage basins of Indonesia
