= Mount Kawi =

Stratovolcano on Java, Indonesia

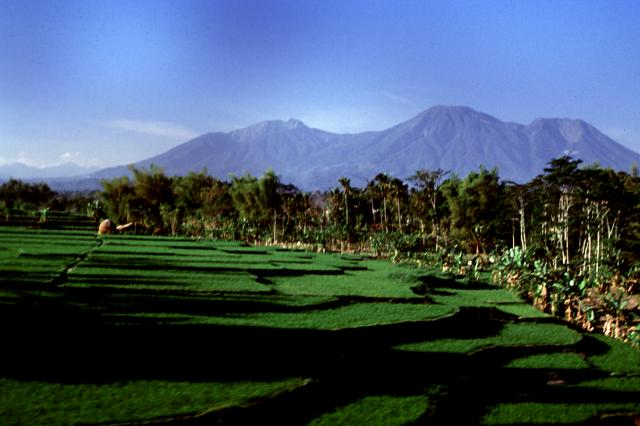

Highest point
- Elevation: 2,551 m (8,369 ft)
- Coordinates: 7.92°S 112.45°E

Geography
- Location: Java, Indonesia

Geology
- Rock age: Holocene
- Mountain type: Stratovolcano
- Volcanic arc: Sunda Arc

Mount Kawi or Gunung Kawi is a stratovolcano in East Java on Java island, Indonesia. It is a massive volcano, adjacent to Mount Butak. There is no historical record of its eruptions.

== See also ==
- List of volcanoes in Indonesia
