= Iyang-Argapura =

Mountain in East Java, Indonesia

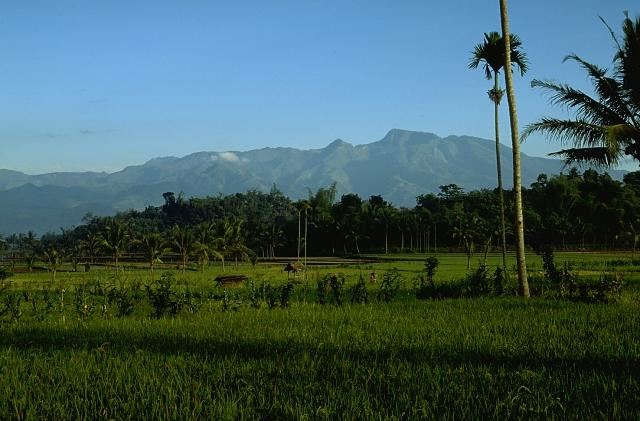
- View of the Iyan-Argapura complex

Highest point
- Elevation: 3,088 m (10,131 ft)
- Prominence: 2,745 m (9,006 ft)
- Listing: Ultra; Ribu
- Coordinates: 7.97°S 113.57°E

Geography
- Location within Java Location within Indonesia
- Location: Java, Indonesia

Geology
- Rock age: Holocene
- Mountain type: Complex volcano
- Volcanic arc: Sunda Arc

Iyang-Argapura or Mount Argopuro is a massive volcanic complex that dominates the landscape between Mount Raung and Mount Lamongan in East Java, Indonesia. Valleys up to 1,000 m deep dissect the strongly eroded Iyang volcano. No historical eruptions have been recorded within the last 500 years, but there is an unverified report about an eruption in AD 1597.

== See also ==
- List of ultras of the Malay Archipelago
- List of volcanoes in Indonesia
