= Mount Lamongan =

Stratovolcano in East Java, Indonesia

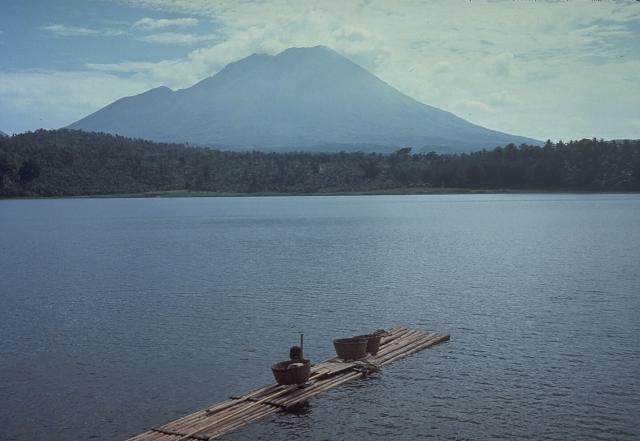
- Mount Lamongan from Ranu Klakah, 1985

Highest point
- Elevation: 1,641 m (5,384 ft)
- Listing: Ribu
- Coordinates: 7.979°S 113.342°E

Geography
- Location within Java Location within Indonesia
- <maplink>
- Location: Java, Indonesia

Geology
- Mountain type: Stratovolcano
- Volcanic arc: Sunda Arc
- Last eruption: February 1898

Mount Lamongan or Mount Lemongan is a small stratovolcano located between the massif Tengger caldera complex and Iyang-Argapura volcano complex in East Java, Indonesia. The volcano is surrounded by maars and cinder cones. The volcano's high point is locally named as Gunung Tarub. Lake-filled maars including Ranu Pakis, Ranu Klakah and Ranu Bedali, located on the eastern and western flanks. The northern flanks are dominated by dry maars. The Green Army organization, led by Aak Abdullah al-Kudus, has been working to reforest the mountain.

== See also ==
- List of volcanoes in Indonesia
