= Mount Perbakti =

Eroded stratovolcano in Java, Indonesia

Perbakti

Highest point
- Elevation: 1,699 m (5,574 ft)
- Coordinates: 6.75°S 106.68°E

Geography
- Location: Java, Indonesia

Geology
- Mountain type: Stratovolcano
- Volcanic arc: Sunda Arc
- Last eruption: Unknown

Perbakti is an eroded stratovolcano west of Mount Salak in West Java, Indonesia. The summit is elongated in a northwest-southwest direction, in which Gunung Endut volcano rises above the saddle of Perbakti. Two 2 km wide depressions on the northern and the southern side has formed two rivers, the Kaluwung Herang and Pamatutan rivers. Fumaroles, mud pots and hot springs are located on the south and the southeast flanks.

== See also ==
- Banten
- Cihara River
- Ciletuh-Palabuhanratu Geopark
- Cimandiri River
- List of volcanoes in Indonesia
- Mount Halimun Salak National Park
- Palabuhanratu Bay
