= Mount Butak =

Stratovolcano in East Java, Indonesia

- ꦒꦸꦤꦸꦁꦧꦸꦛꦏ꧀
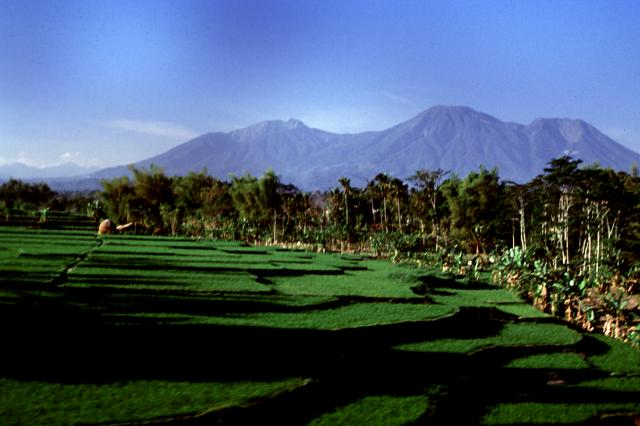
- The Kawi-Butak volcanic massif with Mt. Butak on the center

Highest point
- Elevation: 2,868 m (9,409 ft)
- Listing: Ultra; Ribu
- Coordinates: 7°55′S 112°27′E

Geography
- Location within Java
- Location: Java, Indonesia

Geology
- Rock age: Holocene
- Mountain type: Stratovolcano
- Volcanic arc: Sunda Arc
- Last eruption: Unknown

Mount Butak (Javanese: ꦒꦸꦤꦸꦁꦧꦸꦛꦏ꧀) is a stratovolcano in East Java province on Java island, Indonesia. It is a massive volcano, adjacent to Mount Kawi. There are no historical records of its eruptions.

== See also ==
- List of ultras of the Malay Archipelago
- List of volcanoes in Indonesia
