= Kiaraberes-Gagak =

Eroded stratovolcano on the island of Java

Kiaraberes-Gagak alias Perbakti-Gagak
- Location within Java Location within Indonesia

Highest point
- Elevation: 1,511 m (4,957 ft)
- Coordinates: 6.73°S 106.65°E

Geography
- Location: Java, Indonesia

Geology
- Rock age: Holocene
- Mountain type: Stratovolcano
- Volcanic arc: Sunda Arc
- Last eruption: April 1939

Mount Kiaraberes-Gagak or Mount Perbakti-Gagak is the westernmost volcano on Java island. It is an eroded stratovolcano with fumarolic areas on its flanks.

== See also ==
- List of volcanoes in Indonesia
