= Genuk =

District of Semarang, Central Java

- District
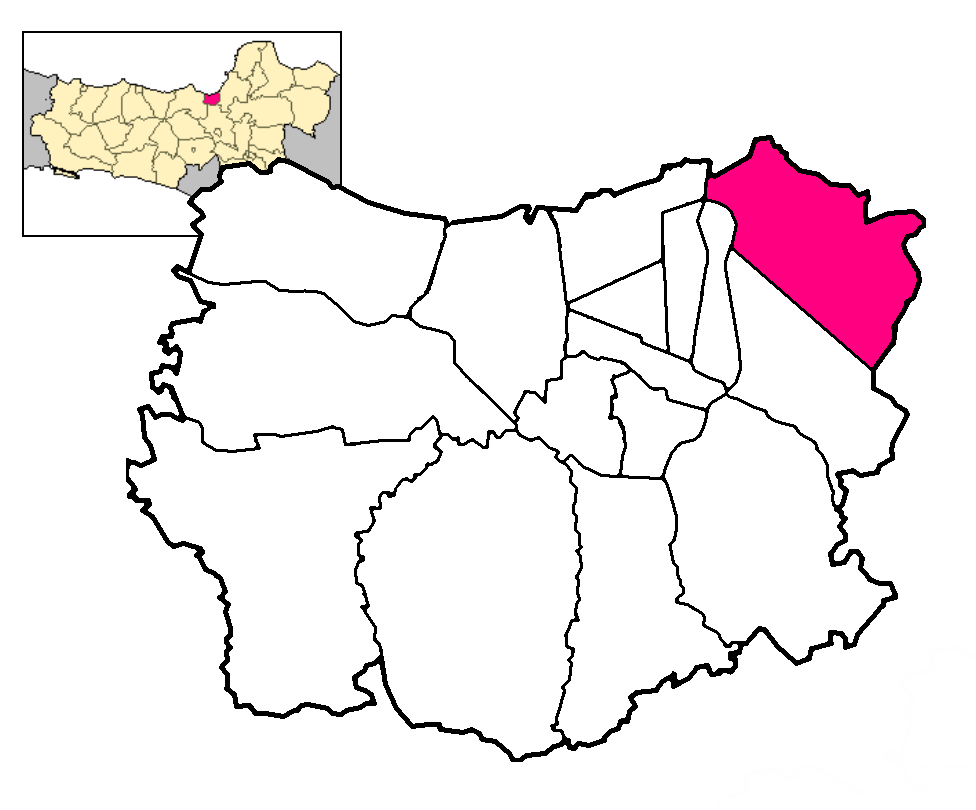
- Location map of Genuk district in Semarang
- Coordinates: 6°58′00″S 110°28′40″E
- Country: Indonesia
- Province: Central Java
- City: Semarang

Area
  - Total: 25.98 km^{2} (10.03 sq mi)

Population (2020)
  - Total: 123,310
  - Density: 4,746/km^{2} (12,290/sq mi)
- Time zone: UTC+7 (IST)
- Postal code: 50111 - 50231

Genuk is an administrative district (kecamatan) in Semarang, Central Java Province, Indonesia.

== Geography ==
Genuk is located in the eastern part of the city of Semarang, the capital of Central Java Province in Indonesia. It extends over low-lying areas near the northern coast of the island of Java, close to the Java Sea. One of its most notable residential areas is Perumahan Sembungharjo Permai.
