= Galunggung =

Stratovolcano in West Java, Indonesia

- Gunung Galunggung
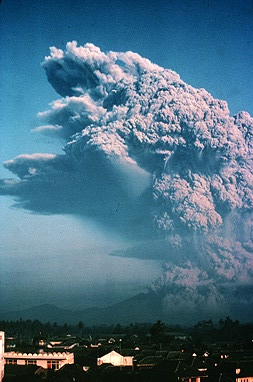
- Galunggung eruption in 1982

Highest point
- Elevation: 2,168 m (7,113 ft)
- Listing: Ribu
- Coordinates: 7°15′24″S 108°04′37″E

Geography
- Location within Java
- Location: West Java, Indonesia

Geology
- Mountain type: Stratovolcano
- Volcanic arc: Sunda Arc
- Last eruption: January 1984

Mount Galunggung (Indonesian: Gunung Galunggung, formerly spelled Galoen-gong, Sundanese: ᮌᮥᮔᮥᮀ ᮍᮜᮥᮀᮍᮥᮀ) is an active stratovolcano in West Java, Indonesia, around 80 km (50 mi) southeast of the West Java provincial capital, Bandung (or around 20 km (12 mi) to the northwest of the West Java town of Tasikmalaya). Mount Galunggung is part of the Sunda Arc extending through Sumatra, Java and the Lesser Sunda Islands, which has resulted from the subduction of the Australian Plate beneath the Eurasian Plate.

For the first time since 1982 after eruptions finished and conditions seemed normal, on February 12, 2012, the status was upgraded to Alert based on changes in conditions. On May 28, 2012, it was lowered from 2 back to 1 (on a scale of 1–4).

== 1822 eruption ==
Galunggung had its first historically documented eruption in 1822. It produced pyroclastic flows and lahars that killed 4,011 people.

== Hazardous eruption of 1982 ==
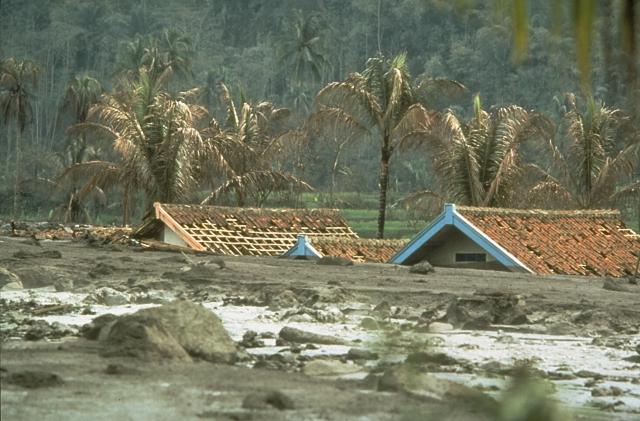
A lahar from the 1982 eruption of Galunggung.

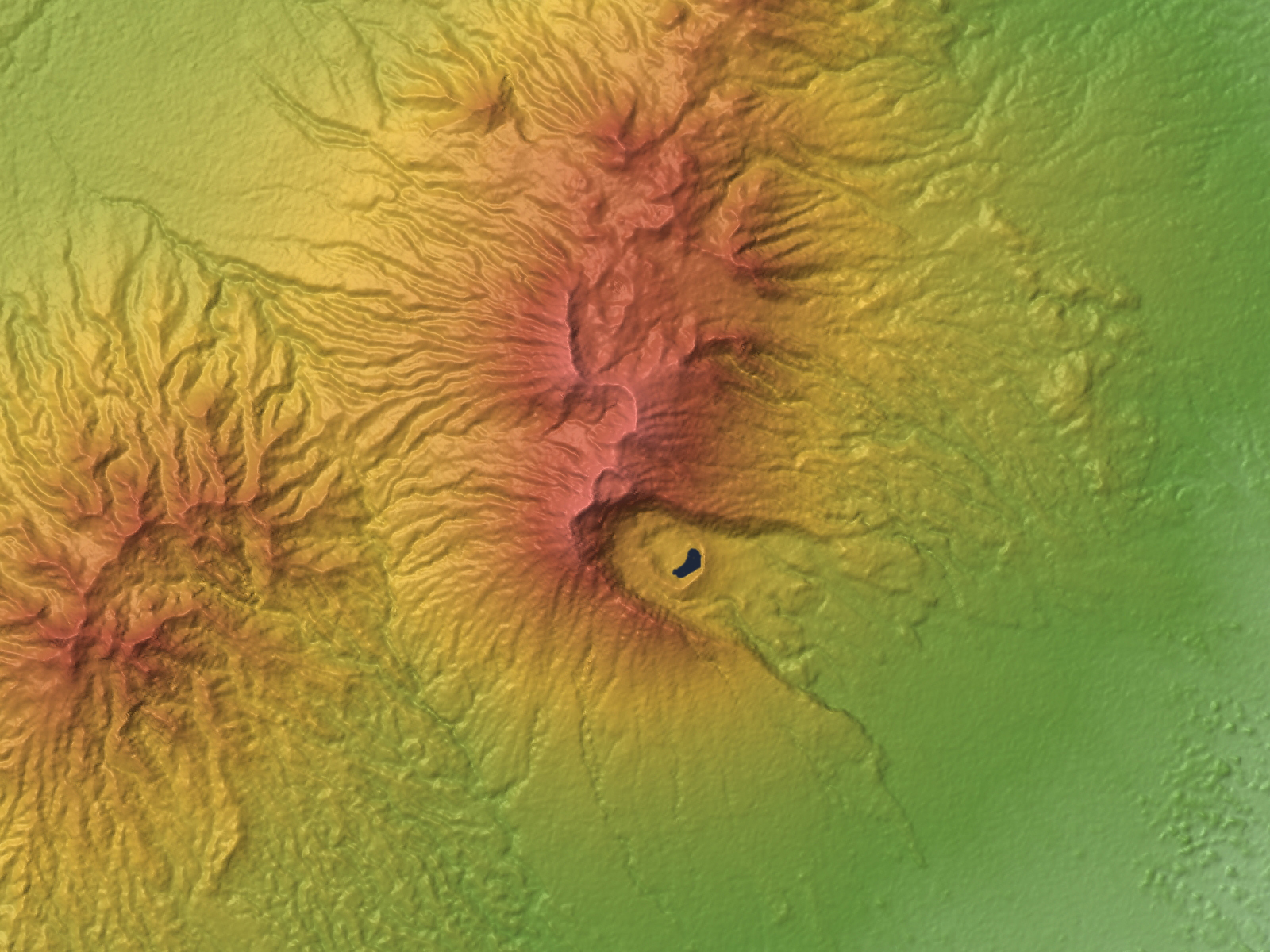
Relief map

The last major eruption on Galunggung was in 1982, which had a Volcanic Explosivity Index of 4 and indirectly killed 18 people in traffic accidents and by starvation. This eruption also brought the dangers of volcanic ash to aviation to worldwide attention after two Boeing 747 passenger jets flying downwind of the eruption suffered temporary engine failures and damage to exterior surfaces, with both planes being forced to make emergency landings at Jakarta airport.

One plane—British Airways Flight 009, carrying 248 passengers and 15 crew traveling from Kuala Lumpur, Malaysia, to Perth, Australia, on June 24, 1982—accidentally entered the ash cloud at night, about 150 km (93 mi; 81 nmi) downwind of the volcano. All four engines failed due to the build-up of volcanic ash, and the aircraft descended for 16 minutes, losing 7,500 m (24,606 ft) of its 11,500 m (37,730 ft) altitude, until the crew managed to restart the engines and land in Jakarta.

Three weeks later, on July 14, Singapore Airlines Flight 21A with approximately 230 passengers aboard also inadvertently entered the cloud at night, and three of its four engines stopped. The crew succeeded in restarting one of the engines after descending 2,400 m (7,874 ft). Both aircraft suffered serious damage to their engines and exterior surfaces.

== Historical avalanche deposits ==
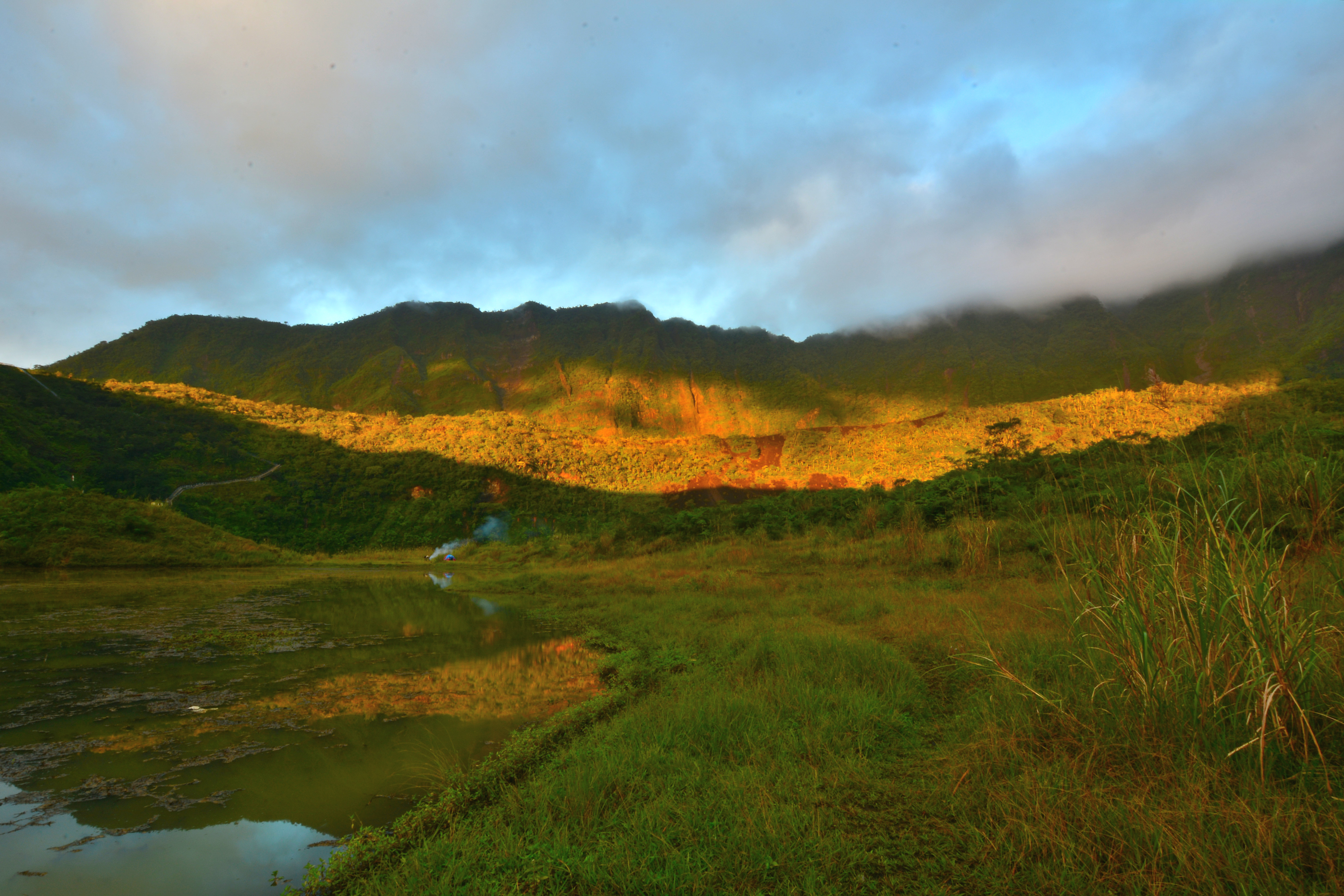
Galunggung mountain in 2017. Nowadays, the caldera is used as a camping site

A hummock deposit known as the Ten Thousand Hills of Tasikmalaya attracted the attention of early-20th-century geologists. Houses were built on the hummocks since they provided good defence against hostile people, and being above the paddy fields were free of mosquitoes and rats. Originally it was thought that either it had been formed by a lahar caused by the release of the waters of the crater lake, or that it was man-made, composed of rocks and boulders dumped there after being cleared from paddy fields.

However, in the light of the Mount St. Helens eruption of 1980 and from examination of the Mount Shasta deposits, it has become clear that the hummocks are a debris-avalanche deposit. Like these mountains, Galunggung has a horseshoe-shaped crater indicating a massive landslide, and examination of shattered lava blocks revealed them to be similar to deposits on the other two volcanoes. According to radiocarbon dating of samples taken from a lava flow, the landslide happened within the last 23,000 years.

== See also ==
- Volcanoes of Java
- List of volcanoes in Indonesia
- List of volcanic eruptions by death toll
