= Gunung Karang =

Highest volcano of Banten, Indonesia

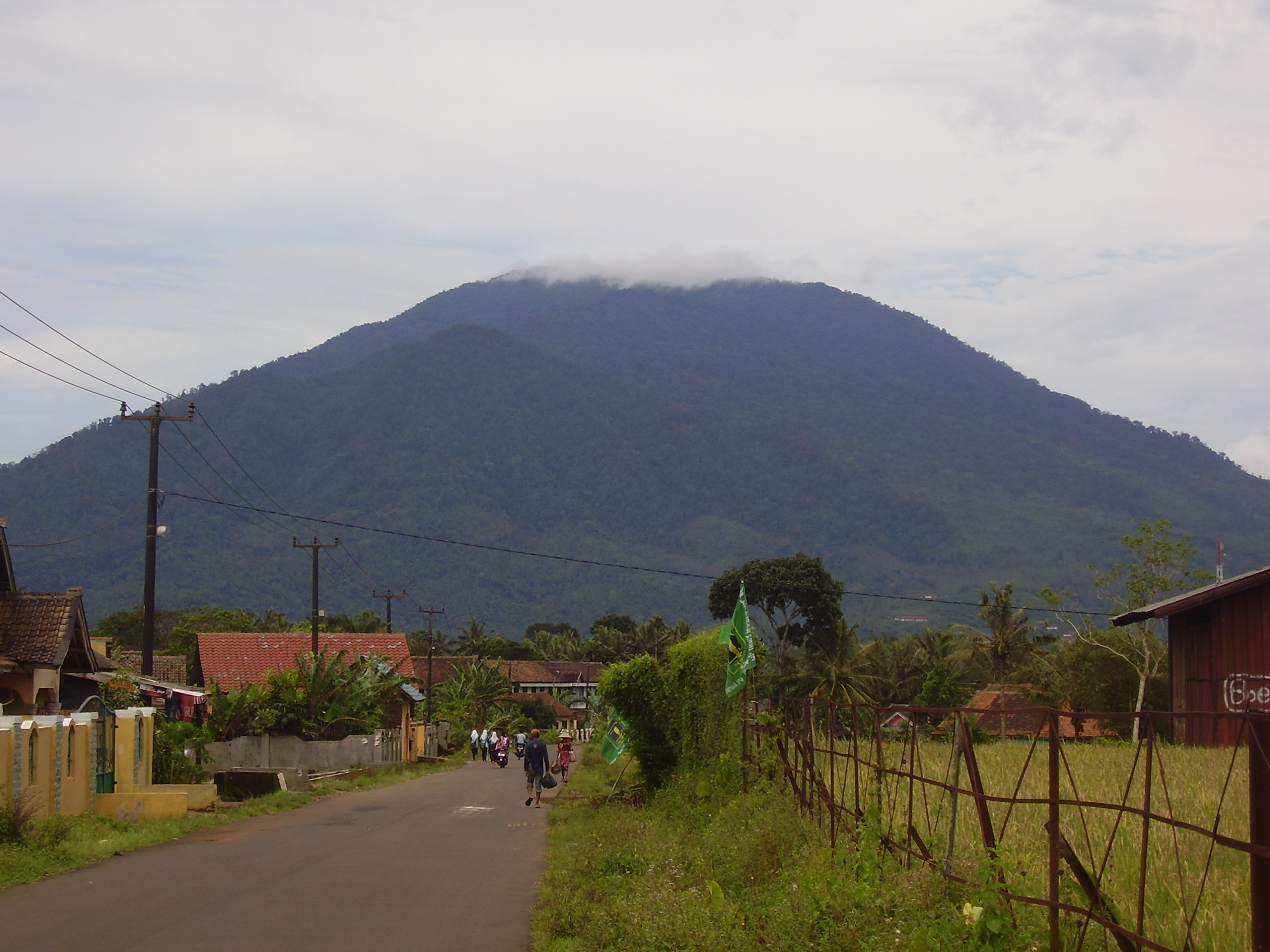
- Mount Karang in Banten. Photo courtesy Sumarso

Highest point
- Elevation: 1,768 m (5,801 ft)
- Prominence: 1,703 m (5,587 ft)
- Listing: List of volcanoes in Indonesia; Ultra; Ribu
- Coordinates: 6°16′09″S 106°03′00″E

Naming
- English translation: Mountain of Rock
- Language of name: Sundanese

Geography
- Location within Java Location within Indonesia
- Location: Banten, Indonesia

Geology
- Rock age: Holocene (?)
- Mountain type: Stratovolcano
- Volcanic arc: Sunda Arc

Climbing
- Easiest route: Hiking

Mount Karang (Sundanese: Gunung Karang, literally, "Mountain of Rock" or "Crag Mountain") is a volcano at the center of Banten, Indonesia. It is also the highest point of the province.

== See also ==
- List of ultras of the Malay Archipelago
