= Sunda Arc =

Volcanic island arc in Indonesia

- Interactive map of Sunda Arc

Geography
- Location: Indonesia
- Coordinates: 7.1510°S 110.1403°E
- Major islands: Sumatra, Java, Nusa Tenggara

Additional information
- Tectonic - Indo-Australian Plate and Eurasia Plate; Major Volcanoes - Merapi, Krakatoa, Mount Sinabung, Semeru

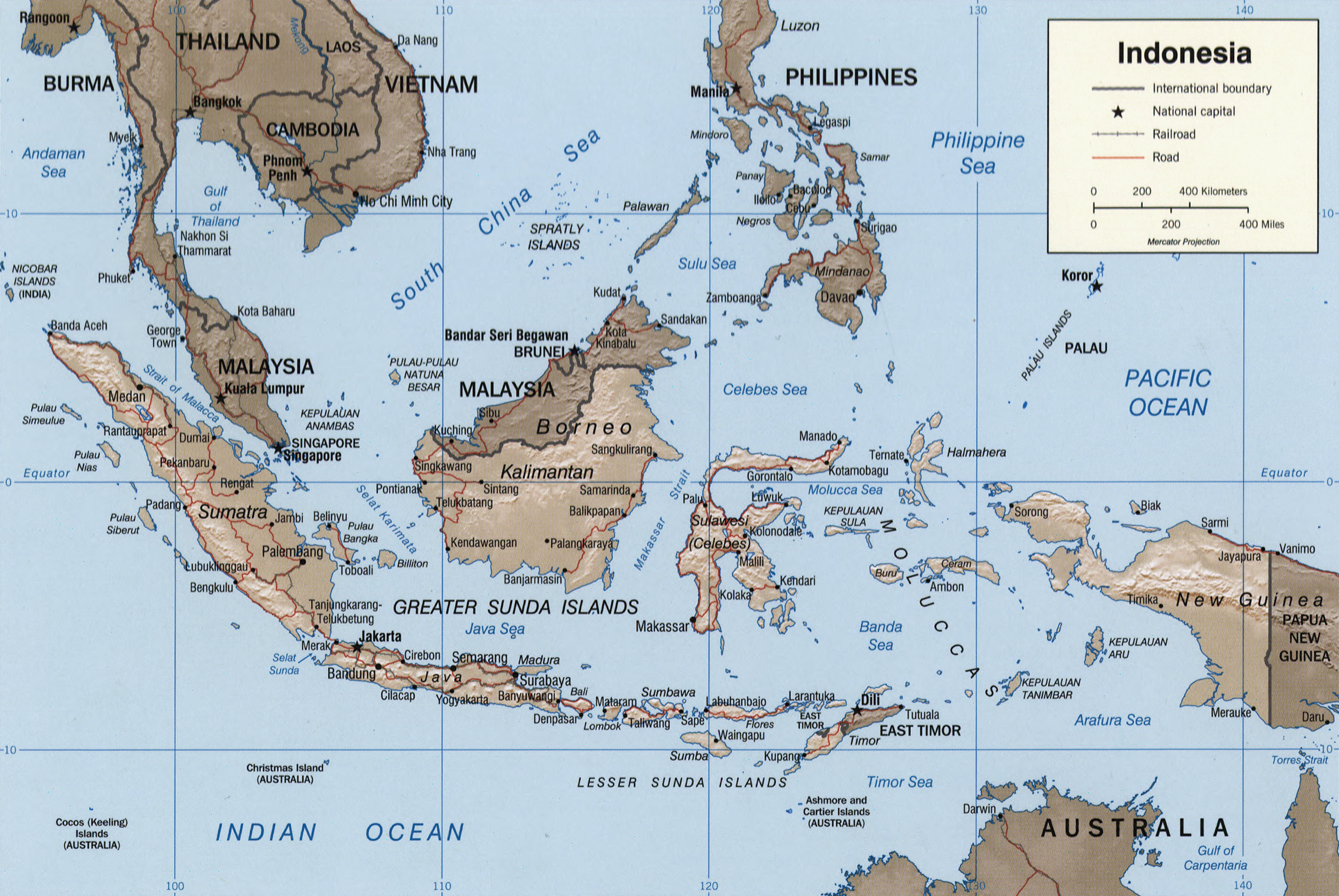
Map of the Sunda Arc

The Sunda Arc is a volcanic arc forming the topographic spine of the islands of Sumatra, Nusa Tenggara, Java, the Sunda Strait, and the Lesser Sunda Islands. The Sunda Arc begins at Sumatra and ends at Flores, and is adjacent to the Banda Arc. The Sunda Arc is formed via the subduction of the Indo-Australian Plate beneath the Sunda and Burma plates at a velocity of 63–70 mm/year.

== Formation and geologic setting ==
Mid-oceanic ridge basalts (MORB) form most of the oceanic basin south of Sunda, according to geodynamic studies. These plates began to converge in the Early Miocene. The Indo-Australian Plate is subducting beneath the Eurasian Plate with a dip angle of 49–56 degrees. The slab subducting under Java is continuous down to the lower mantle. However, the slab appears to beak apart under Sumatra Island. Earthquake depth records indicate that there is no deep seismic activity in Sumatra, likely due to the age of the subducting complex. Two types of subductions have been identified along the Sunda Arc: 1) orthogonal subduction along Java and 2) oblique subduction on the Sumatra side. These subductions are separated by the Sunda Strait.

== Notable seismic events ==
With the ongoing magmatic activities and the nature of the subduction zone, Sunda Arc has experienced major seismic events throughout history. These events cost the loss of lives and vast destruction along the coast. These are some major seismic events that have been recorded.

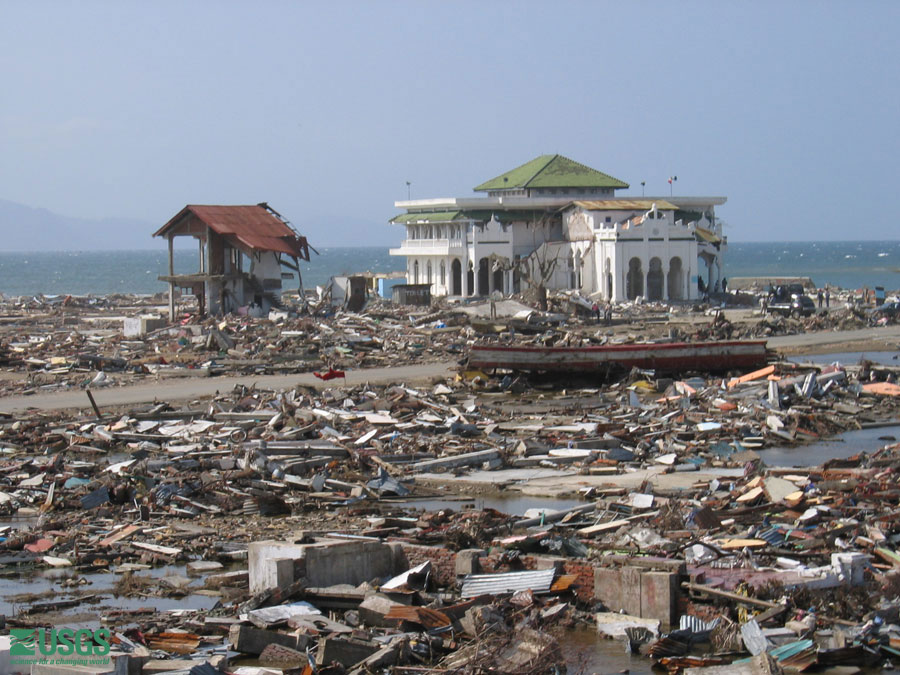
The aftermath of the 2004 tsunami in Aceh, Indonesia

=== Tsunami in December 2004, Indian Ocean ===
In 2004, a tsunami in the Indian Ocean was triggered by an earthquake of 9.15 magnitude near Sumatra Island. In the Banda Aceh area, the tsunami height reached up to 35 meters, which surpassed the value recorded before this event.

=== Tsunami in July 2006, West Java and Central Java, Indonesia ===
An earthquake and tsunami occurred on July 17, 2006, causing major destruction in West Java and Central Java. The M_{w}-7.7 earthquake-induced tsunami struck over 250 km of the coastline and caused more than 600 deaths. The approximate run-up height was about 4–6 meters.

== Historic eruptions and arc volcanism ==
The Sunda Arc is home to some of the world's most dangerous and explosive volcanoes. The 1815 eruption of Mount Tambora on Sumbawa and the 1257 eruption of Mount Samalas on Lombok were among the largest in the last two millennia, ranking 7 on the VEI scale. The Sunda Arc subduction zone was also the site of one of the largest known eruptions of the Cenozoic, the VEI 8 Toba supereruption on Sumatra, which expelled 2,800 km^{3} of magma c. 74,000 BP. The resulting caldera has become Lake Toba. The loudest noise in recorded history occurred during the 1883 eruption of Krakatoa and was heard 5,000 km (3,100 mi) away. Hundreds of thousands of people have been killed by these eruptions and by episodes of activity at other volcanoes, including Papandayan, Galunggung, Merapi, Kelud, Sinabung, and Agung.

=== Main-arc volcanism ===
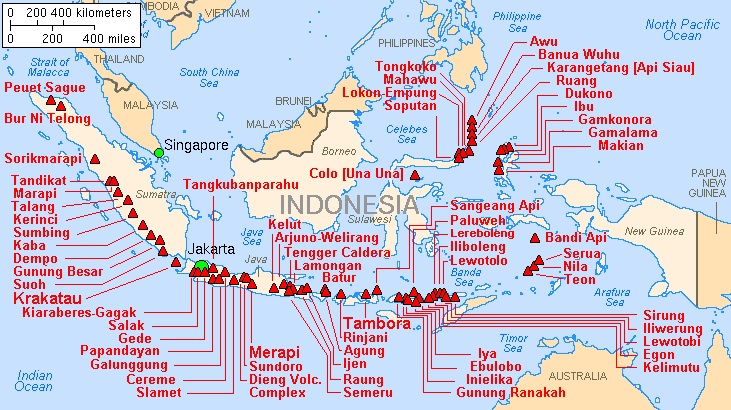
A map showing chains of volcanoes in Indonesia

The main-arc volcanism along Sunda is mainly derived from the interaction between the Indo-Australian Plate and the Eurasia Plate. Magma originates from the partial melting of the mantle wedge driven by the fluids from the subducting slab. In addition, volcanic rocks from the Quaternary generally show more enrichment in alkaline contents than those from the Tertiary age. The majority of basalts of the arc have calc-alkaline contents, except for some potassic lava production in East Java.

=== Back-arc volcanism ===
The magmatic activities along the back-arc may or may not relate to the main arc materials. Magma and lava appear to have originated from molten materials at a deeper part of the mantle as supported by a higher K_{2}O/Na_{2}O ratio in comparison to other parts of Sunda Arc. The most salient volcanoes in the back-arc region are Lasem, Muria, and Bawean in which their volcanic rocks show complex patterns in terms of chemical signature.

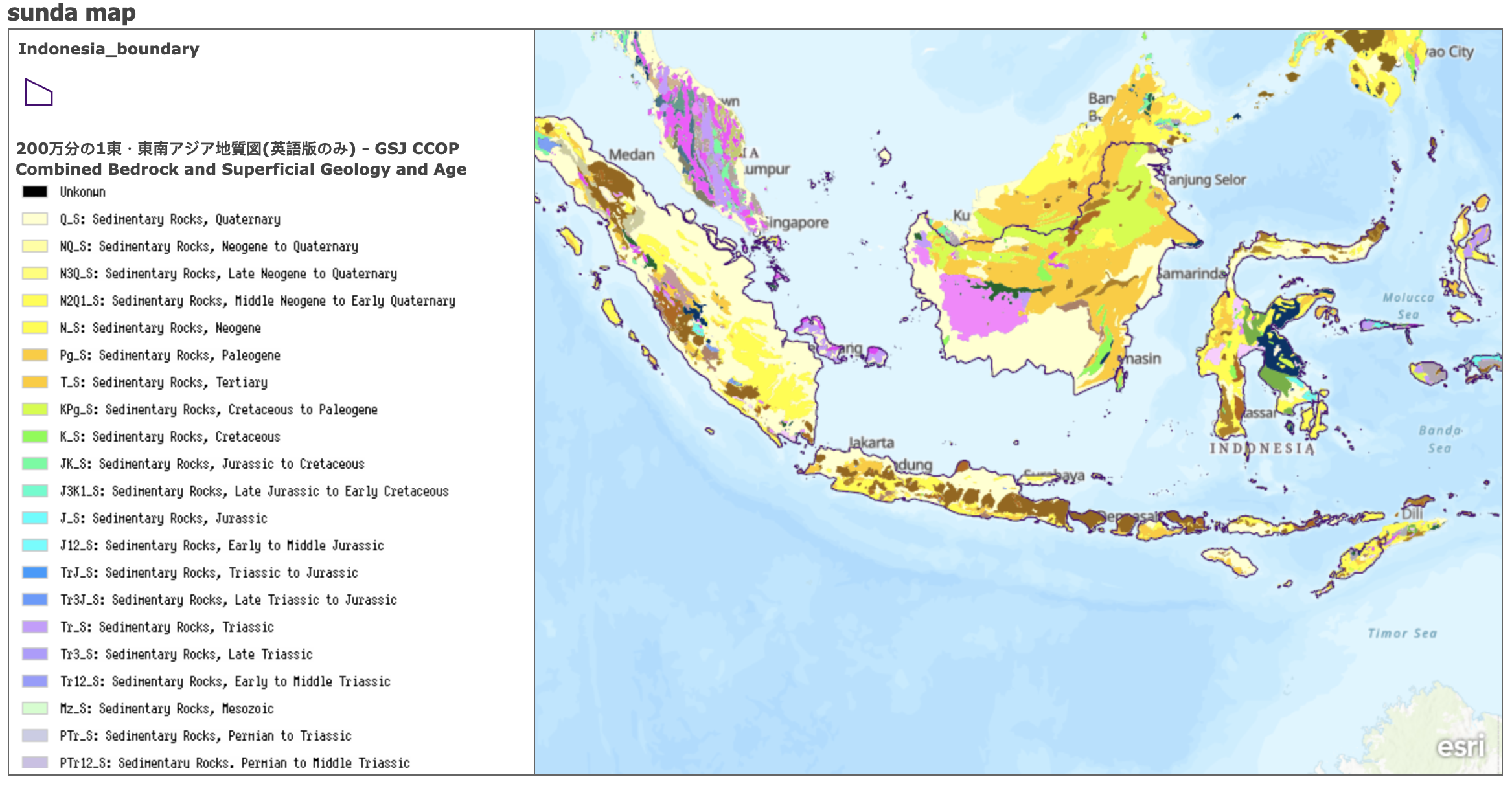
A geologic map of Indonesia Region (ESRI, USGS, HERE, Garmin, NOAA)

== Major islands ==
=== Java ===
Java Island is located on the east side of the Sunda Arc, located between Sumatra and Bali. Its oceanic crust's thickness is approximately 20–25 kilometers. With the geological activities and the tectonic nature of Sunda Arc, megathrust earthquakes and volcanic activities are ubiquitous on Java island. Modern volcanoes at Java are formed during the Tertiary with typical products of andesitic composition and progressively get more alkali content during the Quaternary. Along the Java island, there are approximately 62 geothermal fields that can be utilized for further usages including producing electricity. Java is also a germinal center for supplying gold and copper in which the occurrences of these low-sulfidation (LS) epithermal deposits may associate with magmatic arc activities with the spatial relationship between the akaditic magma and porphyry Cu-Au deposits.

==== East Java ====
Most volcanic activity in East Java is Plinian-type, which is very explosive and emits columns of hot volcanic debris. The adiakitic magma, which deviates from usual island-arc magma, is associated with porphyry deposits. There is evidence that the Ringgit-Beser volcanic complex also produces potassic and magnesian lava, which could be a result of the decreasing influence of subduction-related material. A major volcano in East Java is Mount Bromo.

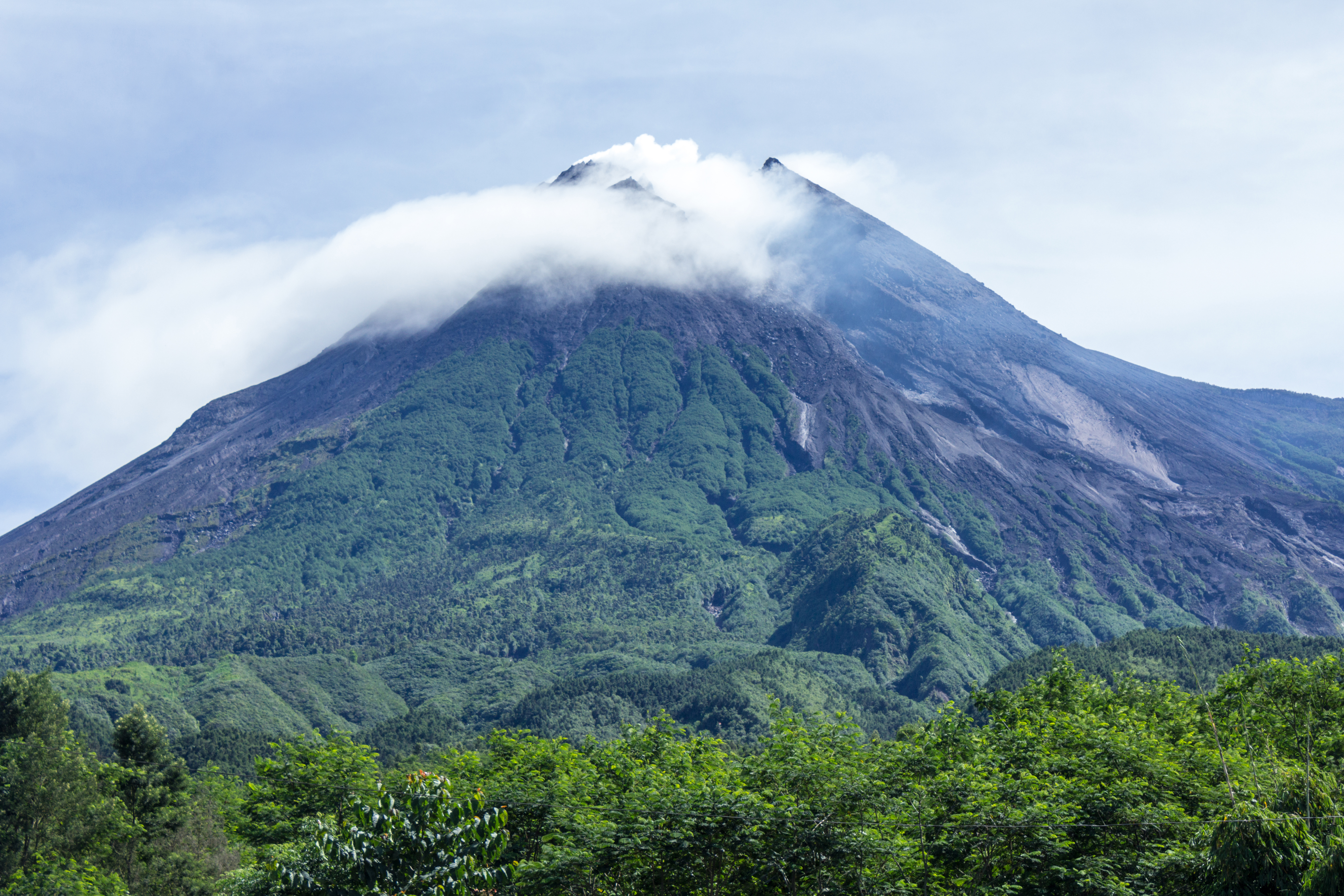
Mount Merapi on Java Island

==== Central Java ====
There exist two main arcs at Central Java which are Southern Mountain Arc (SMA) and Modern Volcanic Arc (MVA) which give rise to frequent volcanic activities. Prior studies suggested that SMA was formed during the Middle Eocene, followed by the subduction that resulted in the formation of MVA in the Late Eocene. Central Java is home to one of the most notorious volcanoes, Merapi, as well as other major volcanoes such as Merbabu, Muria, and Slamet.

Mount Merapi is the most active volcano in Indonesia which erupts periodically every 2–6 years and has shown perennial volcanic activities dating back roughly 2000 years ago based on carbon isotopic signatures. The earliest eruption has been approximated to be roughly 40,000 years ago. The most recent significant eruptions occurred in 1994, 2006, and 2010. Mount Merapi is a steep stratovolcano situated on Central Java Island with seismic and volcanic activities that could pose major threats to countless lives and infrastructures in its vicinity. Most recent volcanic activities are induced by the collapse of the lava dome, contributing to the highly explosive eruption of andesitic materials.

==== West Java ====
The volcanic activities in this region have begun roughly since the Late Cretaceous or Pleistocene epoch. There are two major volcanic zones called the volcanic front (VF) and the rear arc (RA) with different chemical imprints. The volcanic development of the northern area of West Java started earlier during the Late Cretaceous period, while the southern area's volcanic development developed later during the Miocene. The geochemical study of major and trace elements and isotopic signatures of lava have confirmed the steady-state subduction and ongoing replenishment of magma for about 10 Ma. The volcanic rocks found on West Java are dated back to the Eocene. The basement of West Java is a continental lithosphere which can be inferred from crustal assimilation and contamination in volcanic rocks. The latest large eruption recorded in the province was the 1982 eruption of Mount Galunggung, with a recorded VEI of 4.

=== Krakatoa ===
The island of Anak Krakatau has grown at an average rate of five inches (13 cm) per week since the 1950s. Quiet periods of a few days have alternated with almost continuous Strombolian eruptions since 1994. In 1883 CE, tsunamis were triggered by the eruption of Krakatoa with a run-up of 41 meters. The magnitude of damage reached Panama, which was located almost 19,300 km away from the focus.

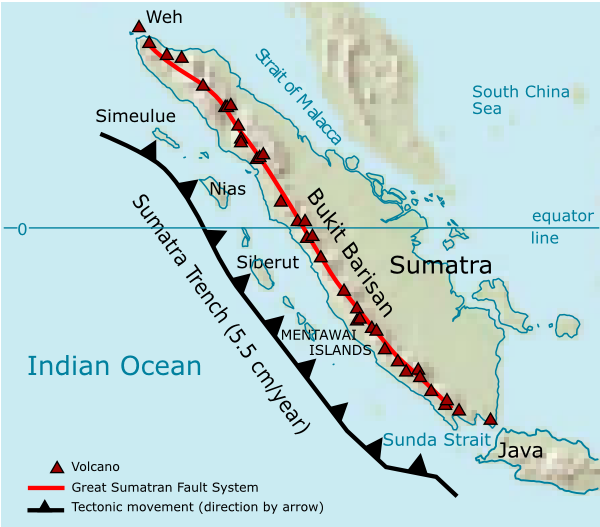
Map of the subduction around Sumatra

=== Sumatra ===
Sumatra Island is located on the southwest side of the Sunda Arc. The main seismic zone of Sumatra is the Sumatra Fault System (SFS), which trends NW-SE. The subducting oceanic crust is dated to be approximately 50 to 90 Ma. A K/Ar study reveals that subducted-related magmatism in Sumatra started roughly in the early Mesozoic according to the evidence derived from the plutonic body on Barisan Mountain. The key mineralization found in Sumatra is epithermal veins of Au, Ag, Zn, Pb, and other metals in which these ore bodies are correlated to arc volcanism and subvolcanism intrusive bodies.

Mount Sinabung is a stratovolcano of andesite and dacite in the Karo plateau of North Sumatra, 40 kilometres (25 mi) from the Lake Toba supervolcano. It has been continuously active since 2013.

=== Nusa Tenggara ===
Nusa Tenggara lies on the east side of the Sunda Arc. The information and study on this island are scarce compared to Java due to the difficulty of access. Generally, the island is composed of Quaternary volcanic deposits. Major volcanoes in Nusa Tenggara are Kelimutu and Mount Rinjani. Another active major volcano in the region is Mount Tambora, whose eruption in 1815 led to global climate abnormalities in the subsequent year, known as the Year Without a Summer. Seismic studies have shown clusters of seismic events beneath active island-arc volcanoes, which may be a result of the collision zone.

== See also ==
- List of volcanoes in Indonesia
