= Cibatu–Cikajang railway =

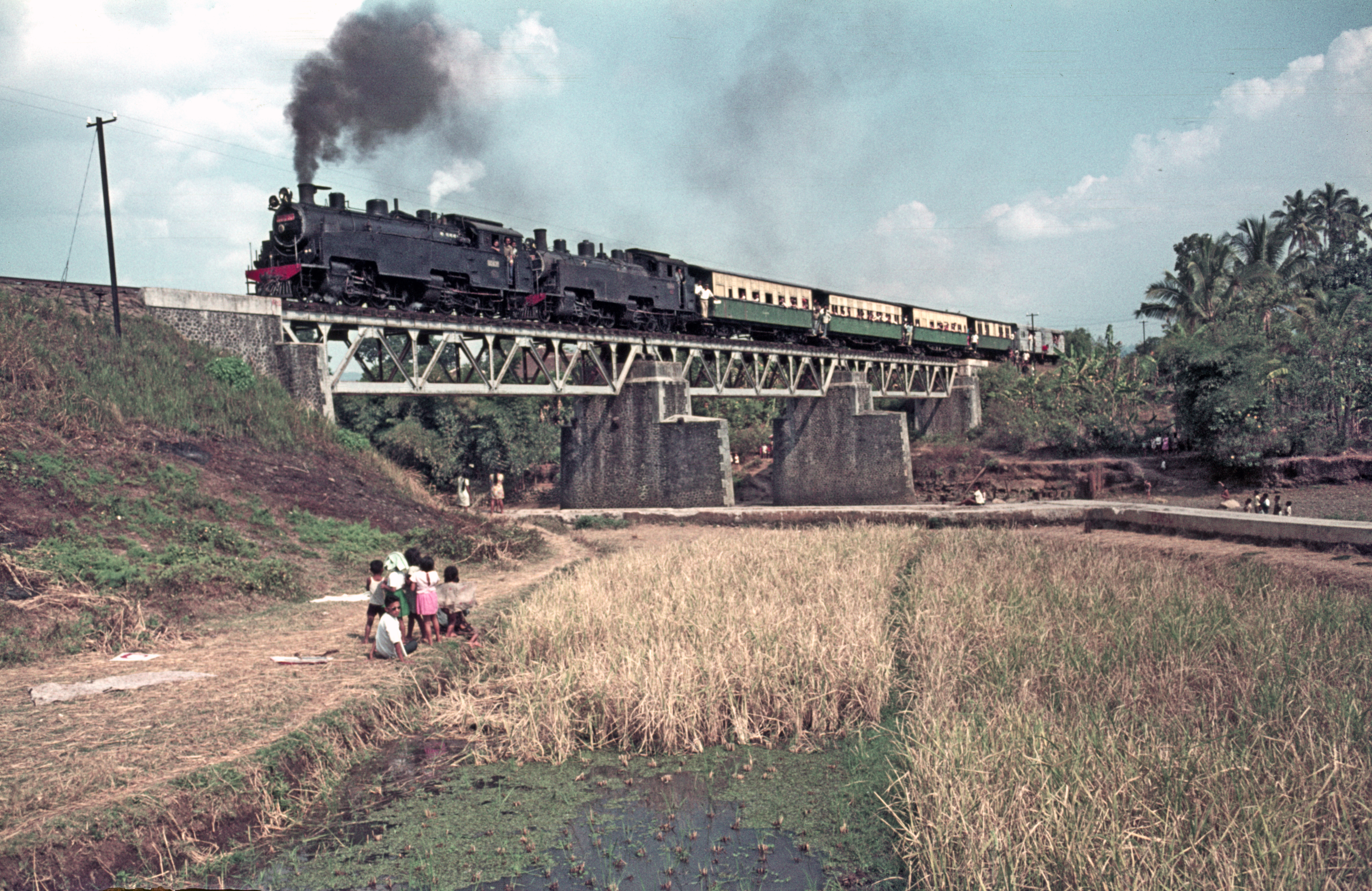
- CC10 14 and CC10 30 locomotive Double heading in August 1972

Overview
- Native name: Jalur kereta api Cibatu–Cikajang
- Status: Operational (Cibatu-Garut only)
- Owner: Directorate General of Railways (DJKA)
- Locale: Cibatu-Garut-Cikajang, West Java
- Termini: Cibatu; Cikajang
- Stations: 15 (13 railway station and 2 railway halts)

Service
- Type: Inter-city rail
- Operator(s): PT Kereta Api Indonesia & KAI Commuter

History
- Opened: 1889-1930

Technical
- Number of tracks: 1
- Track gauge: 1,067 mm (3 ft 6 in)
- Electrification: not available

The Cibatu–Cikajang railway is a branch line of the southern line of Java Island that connecting between Cibatu with Cikajang in Garut Regency with a length of approximately 47 km (29 mi), included in Bandung Operational Area II. Currently, only the Cibatu–Garut segment is operational after the 2019–2022 reactivation, while the Garut–Cikajang segment that is still inactive.

== History ==
=== Cibatu–Garut ===
The design for the Cibatu–Garut railway line was first proposed by the Inspector General of the Staatsspoorwegen (SS), H.G. Derx, who submitted the initial design to the Dutch East Indies Government on 28 October 1882, along with the Cicalengka–Cilacap line. Initially, this line was planned to be built from Warung Bandrek. In 1886, the SS lines were actually planned to be divested, but Derx opposed it. Not only Derx, but also the Surabaya Chamber of Commerce and Industry in a speech dated 4 June 1886 as well as articles by J.K. Kempees and R.A.I. Snethlage in a number of magazines with the result that Minister Sprenger van Eyk postponed the decision regarding the divestment. In the 1887 Dutch East Indies State Budget, van Eyk allocated funds for the construction of the Cilacap–Cicalengka line with a branch to Garut. The line was built together with Cicalengka–Cibatu and completed on 14 August 1889.

The Cibatu to Garut railway line was originally planned as the main route from Bandung to Yogyakarta. Therefore, the construction of this route was carried out in conjunction with the Cicalengka to Cibatu railway. In a lively opening speech for the Cicalengka–Garut line, R.H.J. Spanjaard, the project leader for the line, admitted that the construction of this 51 km (31,6 mil) line was the most difficult compared to other line construction projects between Bandung and Cilacap. One of the difficult parts of the line's construction was building the line between Cicalengka and Leles, which had to pass through the Nagreg area.

Finally, the continuation of the line to Yogyakarta was not built from Garut, but from Cibatu. This decision was made because the mountainous terrain east of Garut was more difficult to build a railway on than the mountains east of Cibatu. This led to the Cibatu–Garut segment being downgraded to a branch line.

=== Garut–Cikajang ===
On 18 March 1921, The law on the construction of steam tram lines in West Java was passed with the issuance of Staatsblad No. 204. The four lines were the Rancaekek–Tanjungsari, Banjaran–Pangalengan, Kopo–Ciwidey, and Garut–Cikajang railway lines. However, due to cost-saving reasons, the construction of the first two lines was temporarily cancelled. The extension of this line, to Garut–Cikajang, was still underway in early 1928.

The fertile soil of Garut, stretching south between Mount Cikuray and Mount Papandayan, encouraged the development of plantations in southern Garut. Consequently, plans were made to extend the railway line south of Garut. Although a detailed engineering design was prepared, construction didn't begin immediately due to doubts about the line's potential profitability and the financial crisis caused by the Great Depression. Furthermore, consideration was given to transporting plantation products by sea from Cilauteureun Bay. Construction of the Garut–Cikajang line finally began in 1926 and opened on 1 August 1930.

=== 1940s to 1950s ===
During the Japanese occupation, the Garut–Cikajang segment was reportedly dismantled along with other railway lines in Indonesia. This dismantling took place in 1942. Japan considered these routes less important. Furthermore, it was also involved in a war in East Asia, which later became known as the Greater East Asia War. Therefore, materials such as these trains were of great value to Japan in meeting its wartime needs.

On 1 June 1942, Japan established the Rikuyu Sokyoku, an agency responsible for the implementation of all non-military land transportation in Java and Madura. This bureau had its headquarters in Bandung, which occupied the former headquarters of the Staatsspoorwegen. To ensure smooth land transportation, this bureau organized transportation based on trains, trucks, buses, cikar, dokar, and so on. Specifically for trains themselves, this bureau employed experts, technicians, and laborers in the railway sector who came from the Dutch and the indigenous community.

After Japan's surrender to the Allies on 15 August 1945 and the Proclamation of Indonesia on 17 August 1945, the railway workers also took over railway assets still under Japanese control. This culminated in the takeover of the Rikuyu Sokyoku headquarters in Bandung on 28 September 1945, returning it to its original function as the railway headquarters, and establishing the Djawatan Kereta Api Republik Indonesia (DKARI).

In the first quarter of the following year, precisely on 20 March 1946, the Allied forces issued an ultimatum to the Indonesian government to remove armed elements from Bandung. The city's atmosphere became tense. On the recommendation of Colonel Abdul Haris Nasution, Ir. Moh. Effendi Saleh, who served as Head of the Traction and Material Department of DKARI, proposed to Ir. Djoeanda Kartawidjaja, the head of DKARI, to move the Railway Center out of the city. The proposal was accepted and it was decided to move the Traffic Department to Cisurupan, Garut, occupying a hotel in the local area; the Traction Department was evacuated to Leles, Garut, occupying a former factory building; The Roads and Buildings Department was evacuated to Purwokerto, occupying a former hotel owned by Serajoedal Stoomtram Maatschappij, and the printing department was placed in Sokaraja, Banyumas. Finally, the Bandung Inspection Office 3 was moved to Tasikmalaya and then again to Banjar.

On 24 March 1946, Bandung was razed to the ground by the Indonesian People's Army and the local population. Thousands of city residents left Bandung while burning their homes and fled to South Bandung, Garut, and the surrounding areas. The scorched earth Bandung City was intended to prevent the city from being exploited by the Allies. This event later became known as the Bandung Sea of Fire.

Shortly after the Bandung Sea of Fire incident, DKARI operated an express train service from Solo to Garut. This express train service was intended to open up fast access between Yogyakarta, the capital of Indonesia at that time, and Cisurupan, Garut. Although Cisurupan, Garut, was chosen as the DKARI Traffic Department office at that time, Cisurupan was inaccessible by train. This was because the Garut-Cikajang line that passed through Cisurupan had been dismantled by Japan and had not yet been rebuilt. The operation of this train also greatly helped the flow of mobilization and movement of people in the southern part of Garut.

Amidst the increasingly harsh threats from Allied and Dutch forces, DKARI finally moved its offices again at the end of 1946. This time, the relocation was quite far from its original location, moving to Yogyakarta, half of Central Java, and part of East Java, in accordance with the agreed-upon demarcation lines of the Republic of Indonesia at that time. In 1947, the Dutch entered West Java and occupied Bandung. Seeing the devastated conditions, the Dutch began repairing and reconstructing the previously destroyed infrastructure. In the railway sector, the Dutch gathered experts, technicians, and employees from state-owned railways (Staatsspoorwegen or SS) and private railways. Subsequently, a merger of state-owned and private railway companies that had previously operated in the Dutch East Indies was formed, called the Staatsspoorwegen Verenigd Spoowegbedjrif (SS/VS).

SS/VS moved quickly in handling the rehabilitation of a number of damaged railway lines in West Java and parts of East Java. In its field implementation, in West Java, SS/VS often received attacks, disturbances and sabotage from rioting groups, such as DI/TII. In Garut itself SS/VS succeeded in reactivating the Garut-Cikajang line which had been dismantled by the Japanese previously. The Garut building was also reconstructed because the main building had been destroyed. For the time being, an emergency station building was erected while waiting for the new building to be completed.The new station building also has an architecture similar to other important SS stations, such as the new Karawang building which was inaugurated on 28 October 1930.

=== Suspend Cibatu-Cikajang (1970-1983) ===
Throughout its operation, this line could only be climbed by large-mass mallet locomotives such as the DD52, CC10, D14, or CC50, all SS heritage. The CC10 locomotive became the mainstay because it was a mallet locomotive of a small size, making it ideal for branch lines, although the decline in condition towards the end of the line's operational period made the CC50 locomotive more frequently used. The 1970s became a golden decade for this line because this line was widely documented by foreign railway enthusiasts. Since that era, the condition of the steam locomotives serving this line began to decline and one by one they were retired. Because there were no more locomotives ready to operate, coupled with the eruption of Mount Galunggung in 1982, which resulted in damaged train facilities and infrastructure and the presence of volcanic ash which impacted the water used for steam locomotives, this line was closed in 1982 for the Garut-Cikajang segment and 1983 for the Cibatu-Garut segment.

Since the line's closure, much of its alignment has been converted into rice fields or plantations, or residential areas near the city. The R25 rails used were also buried beneath the tracks, and during their reactivation, they were re-exposed. Because they were still serviceable, the existing R25 rails were used as forced rails to secure trains on sharp curves.

=== Reactivation (2019-March 2022) ===
For support West Java tourism, the Directorate General of Railways Ministry of Transportation of the Republic of Indonesia granted a 30-year concession right to PT Kereta Api Indonesia to reactivate and operate this railway line. This scheme is also used by the Ministry of Transportation of the Republic of Indonesia to increase the capacity and quality of railway lines located in Southern Sumatra, Araskabu–Kualanamu Airport branch and Batu Ceper–Soekarno-Hatta Airport branch.

On 26 September 2018, Edi Sukmoro, President Director of PT KAI, inspected the condition of the railway line before the reactivation process was carried out, by tracing the dead rail line using a motorbike.

Some of the defunct railway lines are still intact, while others are densely populated with residential areas, especially in Garut. This reactivation is a pilot project for the reactivation of other defunct railway lines.

It is targeted that in September 2019, this route will begin testing and continue with regular operations for make sure that railway line operated in the future. To realize this reactivation, PT KAI assigned PT KA Properti Manajemen (KAPM), a subsidiary of KAI, as the contractor.

This reactivation was carried out by replacing the R25 rails and wooden/steel sleepers that had been buried in the ground with R42 type rails with concrete sleepers, then the "Krian" tebeng signals that had been used were also replaced with semi-automatic Siemens & Halske type mechanical signals, as well as improving the facilities at each station. 2 stations that among the routes selected for revival are Pasir Jengkol and Wanaraja.

On 29 September 2019 one day after the birthday of KAI, a trial was carried out on the first segment, Cibatu–Wanaraja, using the CC201, after previously being compacted. The following day, another trial run was conducted using a Kricak train. Meanwhile, Inspection Train 3, carrying PT KAI's board of directors, also visited for the trial run. Some time later, a community service event was held at Wanaraja Station, organized by the Rail Clinic.

As of mid-January 2020, the reactivation of the second segment of the railway line (Wanaraja–Garut) was fully connected and compaction had been carried out by a mesin pecok.

On 12 March 2020, A train set trial has been carried out on this line. This trial also aims to check the readiness of the signaling, switches, and other supporting facilities and infrastructure before this line can be officially used. However, due to the COVID-19 pandemic, the inauguration of this route had to be postponed until 2022.

On 24 March 2022, the reactivation of the Cibatu–Garut segment was inaugurated by the Minister of Transportation Budi Karya Sumadi and the Minister of State-Owned Enterprises Erick Thohir. The inauguration was also attended by the Regent of Garut, Rudy Gunawan, and officials from PT KAI Daop II Bandung. The reactivation ceremony was held at Garut Station. One day later, two train services named Garut Cibatuan and Cikuray (Pasar Senen-Garut ran regularly on this segment. A total cost of IDR 400 billion has been disbursed for the reactivation of this line.

On 24 January 2024, PT KAI officially one train named the Papandayan that from Gambir with the Panoramic class.

== Service ==
Trains that may pass the Cibatu–Cikajang railway line:

=== Mixed class ===
- Papandayan, between Gambir and Garut (will extended to Cikajang if the Garut-Cikajang railway line reopened)

=== Economy class ===
- Cikuray, between Pasar Senen and Garut (will extended to Cikajang if the Garut-Cikajang railway line reopened)

=== Local (Commuter Line) ===
- Garut Commuter Line, between Purwakarta and Garut (will extended to Cikajang if the Garut-Cikajang railway line reopened)

== See also ==
- Bandung–Tasikmalaya–Kroya
- Cikampek–Padalarang railway
- Rajawali–Cikampek railway
