= Cibatu railway station =

Railway station in Garut Regency, Indonesia

Cibatu Station Stasiun Cibatu
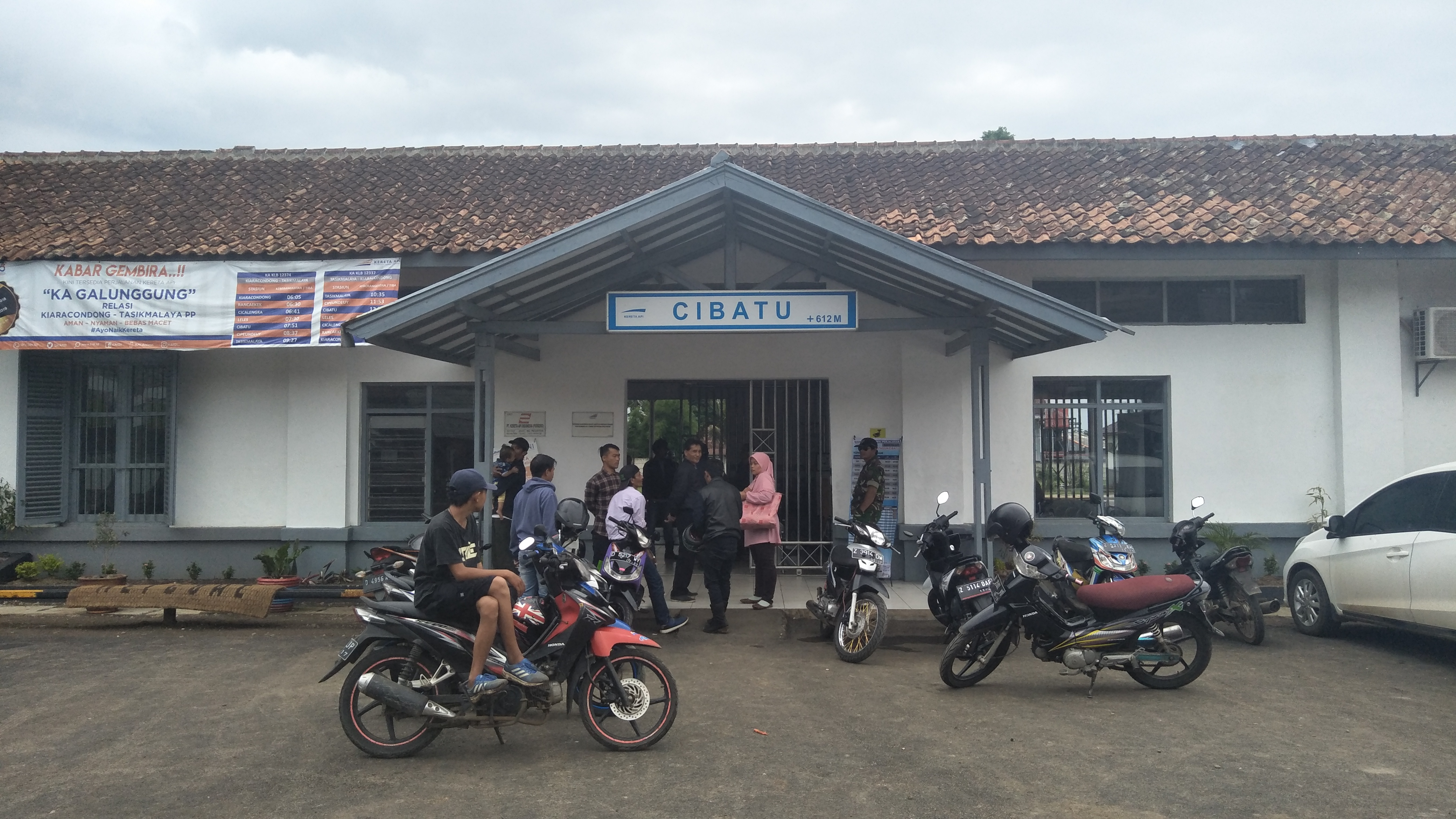
- Cibatu station from the front side, 2019

General information
- Location: Jalan Cibatu, Sidangsari, Garut Regency, West Java, Indonesia; Indonesia
- Coordinates: 7.1001°S 107.9795°E
- Elevation: 612 metres (2,008 ft)
- Owner: Kereta Api Indonesia
- Manager: Kereta Api Indonesia
- Lines: Padalarang–Kasugihan; Cibatu–Cikajang; C Garut Commuter Line
- Platforms: 4 (one side platform and three island platforms which are all quite low)
- Tracks: 4

Construction
- Parking: available
- Accessible: available

Other information
- Status: active
- Station code: CB
- Classification: I

History
- Opened: 1 October 1890
Location

Cibatu Station (CB) is a Class I railway station located in Cibatu, Cibatu, Garut Regency, which is 58 kilometres east of Bandung. The station, which is located at an elevation of 612 meters above sea level is included in Bandung Operational Area II and is currently the largest railway station in Garut Regency with an area of 1 ha (10,000 m^{2}).

The location of Cibatu station is approximately 21 kilometers north of Tarogong Kidul, Garut. Its location and relatively large size make it the primary departure station for Garut residents traveling by rail to destinations across Java.

The Cibatu station has a branch to the Cibatu–Cikajang railway line, but was deactivated in 1983 due to competition from private vehicles and other means of public transportation. On 24 March 2022, the Cibatu–Garut line officially reopened after nearly 40 years of inactivity.

The only train that passes through Cibatu station without stopping is the Kahuripan.

== History ==
=== Early History ===
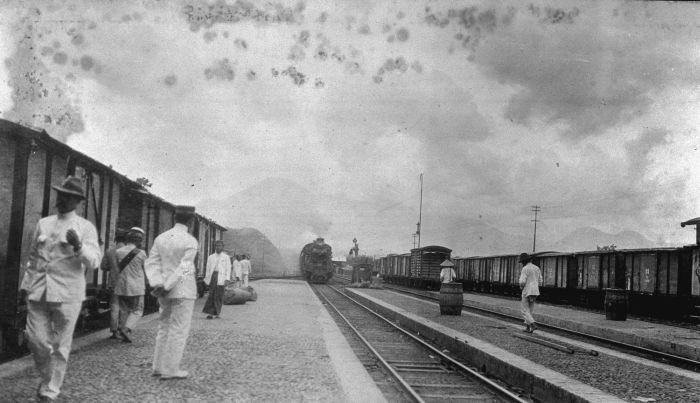
Cibatu station in 1918

The Cicalengka–Cibatu–Garut railway line was opened on 14 August 1889, as part of a project to connect Cicalengka Station with Cilacap by Staatsspoorwegen, the railway company owned by the Dutch East Indies. However, advertisements in newspapers Bataviaasch Handelsblad and Java-bode indicate that Cibatu Station only served as a train stop and general passenger station on 1 October 1890.

During the Dutch colonial era, Cibatu Station was a popular station because it became a stopover for European tourists who wanted to vacation in the Garut area. In the book "A Century of Grand Hotel Preanger 1897-1997" written by Haryoto Kunto, between 1935 and 1940 every day at Cibatu Station, a dozen taxis and limousines belonging to hotels in Garut were parked, including the Papandayan Hotel, Villa Dolce, Belvedere Hotel, Van Hengel Hotel, Bagendit Hotel, Villa Pautine, and Grand Ngamplang Hotel. At that time, the Garut area with its beautiful natural conditions was indeed a favoured destination among European tourists.

=== Visits of Famous Figures ===
British comedian Charlie Chaplin visited Cibatu station in 1927. At that time, Charlie Chaplin and actress Mary Pickford were travelling to Garut.

Another notable figure who visited the station was Georges Clemenceau, founder of the newspapers La Justice (1880), L'Aurore (1897), and L'Homme Libre (1913). Clemenceau also served as Prime Minister of France for two terms, from 1906 to 1909 and from 1917 to 1920.

Following Indonesian independence in 1946, then the President of the Republic of Indonesia, Soekarno, also visited Cibatu Station during a series of extraordinary train journeys along the southern route. Throughout the journey, residents of small towns asked Soekarno to disembark at each station (including Cibatu Station) and deliver speeches.

=== Ticket Counter Closing ===
Despite serving passengers, Cibatu Station along with Garut, Wanaraja, Pasirjengkol, Leles, and Leuwigoong officially stopped selling Garut Cibatuan Local Train tickets (now called Commuter Line Garut) at the station counter (go show), the only local train served at this station, starting 1 November 2022. Tickets became available exclusively through the Kereta Api Indonesia application Access (now called Access by KAI) up to seven days before departure (H-7).

While on 1 January 2025, Cibatu Station has also officially stopped selling intercity train tickets (KAJJ) via "go show" service, along with Leles Station and Cipeundeuy. The station now only offers ticket sales through automated ticket machines ("box" counters). Ticket reservations can also be made through the KAI "Access by" app, the official KAI website, and other external channels.

== Facilities ==
On the north side of the station is a locomotive depot which was formerly used for repair and maintenance of steam locomotives. This locomotive depot also functioned as a reserve facility if a locomotive had to be replaced during a trip due to damage or if there was a locomotive with a train that required additional motive power (usually double traction). In 1983, with the closure of the Cibatu-Cikajang railway line, the depot ceased operating as one of the main depots. Currently, the depot only has the status of a sub-depot.

In addition to the original station building and locomotive depot, other ancient buildings that still exist at Cibatu Station include the water tower, signal house, safe, and old signaling equipment. Signal and switch settings are carried out at the station's signal house.

== Service ==
The following trains stopped at Cibatu station under the 2025 timetable (Gapeka 2025) and its July 2025 revision.

=== Inter-city rail ===
Southern Java Line
Train name	Class	Relation		Information
Mixed class
Lodaya (regular & addition)	Executive	Bandung	Solo Balapan	Via Tasikmalaya–Yogyakarta
Lodaya (regular & addition)	Economy	Bandung	Solo Balapan	Via Tasikmalaya–Yogyakarta
Papandayan	Panoramic	Gambir	Garut	Via Purwakarta–Bandung
Papandayan	Executive	Gambir	Garut	Via Purwakarta–Bandung
Papandayan	Premium Economy	Gambir	Garut	Via Purwakarta–Bandung
Pangandaran	Panoramic	Gambir	Banjar	Via Purwakarta–Bandung
Pangandaran	Executive	Gambir	Banjar	Via Purwakarta–Bandung
Pangandaran	Premium Economy	Gambir	Banjar	Via Purwakarta–Bandung
Baturraden Express	Executive	Purwokerto	Bandung	Via Tasikmalaya–Kroya stopped only bound to Bandung (status: ceased as regular)
Baturraden Express	Business	Purwokerto	Bandung	Via Tasikmalaya–Kroya stopped only bound to Bandung (status: ceased as regular)
Economy
Kutojaya Selatan addition	Economy	Kiaracondong	Kutoarjo	Via Tasikmalaya–Kroya
Cikuray	Premium Economy	Pasar Senen	Garut	Via Cikampek–Kiaracondong
Serayu	Economy	Pasar Senen	Purwokerto	Via Cikampek–Kiaracondong
Pasundan (regular & addition)	Economy	Kiaracondong	Surabaya Gubeng	Via Tasikmalaya–Lempuyangan

=== Local (Commuter rail) ===
Train name	Relation		Information
C Garut Commuter Line	Garut	Purwakarta	The journey to Purwakarta is only during the day, while the reverse is in the morning and evening.
C Garut Commuter Line	Garut	Padalarang	One-way travel only in the morning.
C Garut Commuter Line	Cibatu	Padalarang	The trip to Padalarang is only in the morning, while the reverse is in the evening.

== Incident ==
- On 15 November 1951, the Bandung-Surabaya Express was detained by an Indonesian National Armed Forces (TNI) soldier at Cibatu Station, because fighting was taking place in the Leles area. Subsequently, on 25 June 1952, train no. 334, which was stopped at Cibatu Station, was also detained by an Indonesian National Armed Forces (TNI) soldier on its way to Garut due to fighting taking place in the Cimanuk and Tunggilis areas. Both incidents were related to conflicts involving groups believed to be affiliated with DI/TII.

Preceding station	Kereta Api Indonesia	Following station
Leuwigoong towards Padalarang	Padalarang–Kasugihan	Warungbandrek towards Kasugihan
Terminus	Cibatu–Cikajang	Pasirjengkol towards Cikajang
