= Geothermal power in Indonesia =

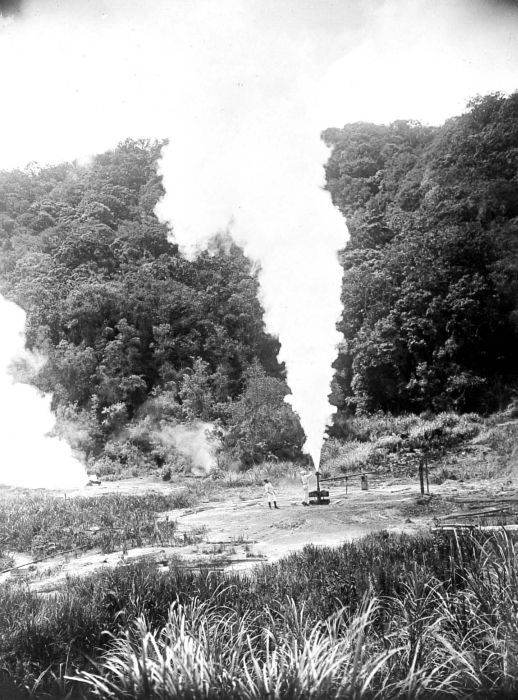
First successful geothermal test boring in Indonesia at Kawah Kamojang in 1926

Geothermal power in Indonesia is an increasingly significant source of renewable energy. As a result of its volcanic geology, it is often reported that Indonesia has 40% of the world's potential geothermal resources, estimated at 28,000 megawatts (MW).

With 2,653 MW of installed capacity as of year-end 2024—reflecting additions such as the Sorik Marapi and Salak expansions—Indonesia ranked second in the world after the United States (3,937 MW) in installed geothermal power capacity, ahead of the Philippines. By 2025, Indonesia's Ministry of Energy and Mineral Resources reported that installed geothermal capacity had reached 2,744 MW (about 2.71 GW). In 2007, geothermal energy represented 1.9% of the country's total energy supply and 3.7% of its electric power.

At the 2010 World Geothermal Congress in Bali, President Susilo Bambang Yudhoyono announced a plan to build 44 new geothermal plants by 2014, more than tripling capacity to 4,000 MW. By 2025, Indonesia aims to produce more than 9,000 MW of geothermal power, becoming the world's leading geothermal energy producer. This would account for 5% of Indonesia's total energy needs.

A detailed report on the geothermal sector in Indonesia issued in 2015 by the Asian Development Bank and World Bank, Unlocking Indonesia's Geothermal Potential, indicated that reforms in key areas of policy were likely to be needed to stimulate sustained expansion in the sector.

== History ==
The first proposal on energy from volcanoes came in 1918 during the Dutch colonial era. In 1926, five test borings were drilled in Java's Kawah Kamojang field, the third being the first that was successful. In the early 1980s, it was still discharging superheated steam from a depth of 66 metres at a temperature of 140 °C and a pressure of 3.5 to 4 bars. A prefeasibility study for electricity generation was initiated in 1972 by Geothermal Energy New Zealand. The first generator was inaugurated in 1983 by President Suharto and subsequently expanded in 1987.

Since the mid-1980s, Chevron, the world's largest geothermal power producer, has operated two geothermal fields in West Java at Salak and Darajat with a combined capacity of around 365 MW. Between 1989 and 1997, explorations were conducted at the Sibayak geothermal field in northern Sumatra, and subsequently a 12 MW plant has been placed in operation.

In 1991, the Indonesia Geothermal Association (Asosiasi Panasbumi Indonesia - API), a non-governmental organisation, was established to promote and advertise geothermal energy. It has approximately 500 members including geothermal experts, companies, and stakeholders. The Wayang Windu Geothermal Power Station in West Java, owned by British Star Energy, has been in operation since 2000. It currently comprises two units with a total capacity of 227 MW. There are plans for a third unit of 127 MW which is expected to be on-stream by mid-2013.

== Exploration and development ==
Exploration of the Bedugul Geothermal Field in Bali started in 1974 and though production capacity was estimated at 175 MW in 2008, the project is on hold after being opposed by local residents.

At the 2010 World Geothermal Congress in Bali, several companies were awarded the rights to develop geothermal fields and power plants: Golden Spike Indonesia won the tender to develop a power plant at Mount Ungaran in Central Java, Sokoria Geothermal Indonesia gained rights to develop a plant at Ende, on Flores island, while Supreme Energy was chosen to develop plants at Mount Rajabasa in Lampung and Solok in West Sumatra. These projects were estimated to require a total investment of US$1.68 billion.

As of 2010, a total of 265 potential sites for plants have been identified across the country. Development of the industry, however, involves a range of complex policy issues, some of which are proving to be a continuing source of controversy. In mid-2011, for example, the Indonesian Government issued an expected regulation providing certain guarantees for investors with the aim of encouraging increased investment in the geothermal sector. However, investor response was guarded, suggesting that key aspects had not been addressed in the regulation.

In late 2013, PT Pertamina Geothermal Energy (PGE) -- a geothermal business branch of state oil and gas company PT Pertamina—said that it planned to develop eight new geothermal plants with a total capacity of 655 MW (expected to require $2.0 bn of new investments). These included:

- 110 MW at Ulubelu in Lampung Province
- 110 MW at Lumut Balai in South Sumatra
- 40 MW at Lahendong
- 30 MW at Karaha
- 35 MW at Kamojang
- 110 MW at Hululais
- 110 MW at Sungai Penuh

Of these, several were to be financed with loans from World Bank and Japan International Cooperation Agency.

In addition, work is starting on the Sarulla geothermal plant in North Sumatra with a total planned capacity of 320 MW. The plant has been on the books since the early 1990s but development was stalled over various issues. The plant, expected to cost around $1.65 billion, will be built with financial support from the Asian Development Bank along with the Japan Bank for International Cooperation and other lenders. The first 110 MW started in 2017.

== Installed capacity ==
According to the Renewable Energy Policy Network's Renewables 2013 Global Status Report, Indonesia has the third largest installed generating capacity in the world in the geothermal sector. With 1.3 GW installed capacity, Indonesia trails only the United States (3.4 GW) and the Philippines (1.9 GW). However it leads Mexico (1.0 GW), Italy (0.9 GW), New Zealand (0.8 GW), Iceland (0.7 GW), and Japan (0.5 GW).

According to the International Renewable Energy Agency, Indonesia as of 2021 has the second largest installed generating capacity globally in the geothermal sector; with 2.3 GW installed capacity, Indonesia trails only the United States (3.9 GW).

== Recent developments ==
In recent years, the Indonesian Government has announced plans for two 'fast-track' increases in the total capacity of Indonesia's electricity generation network of 10,000 MW each. Under the second 10,000 MW fast-track plan it was forecast that a relatively large share of 3,970 MW would be installed in geothermal plants. But under the first 10,000 MW fast-track plan, investment in the geothermal sector appears to be lagging.

- September 2011: The Indonesian state-owned electricity utility Perusahaan Listrik Negara (PLN) announced that the outlook was that by 2014 only 1,200 MW of power was likely to be produced from geothermal plants. The then-president director of the PLN, Dahlan Iskan, said that plans to develop a number of geothermal plants were behind schedule because private sector investors were reluctant to invest as a result of the perceived risks in the sector.
- July 2012: A senior official from the PLN reported that there were 13 geothermal power plants that were still stuck in the exploration stages and were likely to miss development deadlines. Problems mentioned included disappointing results at drilling sites, lack of adequate supporting infrastructure (mainly roads), and difficulties that firms faced in obtaining required permits for their activities from the forestry department and local governments.
- June 2013: The first International Geothermal Conference and Exhibition was held in Indonesia. The relatively slow development of the sector attracted comment. The Minister for Energy and Mineral Resources announced that the prices to be paid for energy supplied by geothermal suppliers would be increased to encourage activity in the sector. Speaking at the conference, the Indonesian Vice President Boediono called for changes in policy to speed up development.
- June 2013: Work on a significant geothermal project in Lampung in South Sumatra (planned size, 220 MW) was suspended following local protests. Local villagers in the Mount Rajabasa area claimed that development of the project would damage the social structure of the community. The Forestry Minister, Zulkifli Hasan, sided with the local community saying that the company developing the site, PT Supreme Energy, would need to convince the local villagers of the safety of the project. In response, the chair of the Indonesian Geothermal Association said that the government should shut all geothermal projects if top officials were "half-hearted" in their commitment to investors.
- August 2014: The Indonesian Parliament approved a new Geothermal Law aimed at facilitating development in the sector. Key points of the new law included the following: (a) Geothermal activities would no longer be considered mining activities; development of geothermal resources can be carried out in forest conservation areas. Under the existing Forestry Law, mining operations are prohibited in protected forests. (b) Tenders for geothermal projects will be called by the central government instead of by local administrations. (c) New geothermal projects will be developed under new, more favorable, pricing arrangements. (d) Local administrations will receive a portion of the revenues derived from geothermal resources. (e) Quite detailed provisions were set out regarding such things as surveys of geothermal sites, exploration, tendering procedures, the size of working areas, arrangements for determining prices and administrative sanctions, obligations of the holders of geothermal licenses, and so on.

== Policy issues ==
Expansion in the sector appears to be being held back by a range of factors including an uncertain regulatory environment (including, especially, uncertainty over land laws) and the perceived risks of development. The Indonesian Government's plans for development of the geothermal sector rely largely on private sector investment. But numerous reports indicate that private sector investors are concerned about a range of risks including technical (geological) risks, regulatory risks stemming from uncertain government policy, and financial risks arising from the pricing policies determined by the Indonesian Government. For example, coal has been indirectly subsidised through the Domestic Market Obligation policy, which requires coal companies to sell at a government-specified, subsidised rate to the national utility. By comparison, geothermal power has enjoyed relatively unfavourable tender processes and is sold at higher prices. This makes it difficult for geothermal plants to compete with conventional fuels.

There is disagreement within the Indonesian Government as to how to mitigate risks or, where that is not possible, who should bear these risks. Policy makers in the power sector, with an eye to meeting the government's official investment targets, are often inclined to the view that at least some of the risks should be borne by the Indonesian Government through the national budget managed by the Ministry of Finance. Official policy from the Ministry of Finance has traditionally been cautious, resisting the suggestion that unspecified risks should be borne by the Indonesian budget.

In response to reports about certain of the risks that private sector investors were concerned about, in mid-2011 the government issued a regulation intended to provide guarantees that the state electricity utility PLN would meet financial obligations to independent power producers (IPPs) who invested in the geothermal sector. But the regulation was quickly criticised by representatives of private investors as being too limited and for failing to clarify important concerns.

Pricing policy

Prices have been another important policy issue in the sector. In an effort to encourage private sector investment, the Indonesian government has been establishing a feed-in tariff scheme by instructing state electricity utility PLN to purchase power from geothermal projects at various rates ranging from around 6.5 US cents to over 12 US cents per kWh. The government is also preparing a regulation that is expected to specify the price that the PLN must purchase power from geothermal plans in the second 10,000 MW fast-track electricity sector program which the government has announced; this regulation is expected to be finalised by early 2012.

== Environmental issues ==
According to the Ministry of Forestry, around 80% of geothermal reserves are located in designated conserved forest areas. The 2009 mineral and coal mining law lists geothermal exploration as a mining activity so a presidential decree would be required to allow geothermal activities within conserved forest areas. According to the ministry, geothermal mining is unlikely to cause environmental harm. In May 2011, the Indonesian government imposed a two-year moratorium on logging. However this excepts the energy sector, including geothermal activities.

== See also ==
- List of power stations in Indonesia
- List of geothermal power stations
- List of volcanoes in Indonesia
- Energy in Indonesia
