= Garut =

Town in West Java, Indonesia

- Town
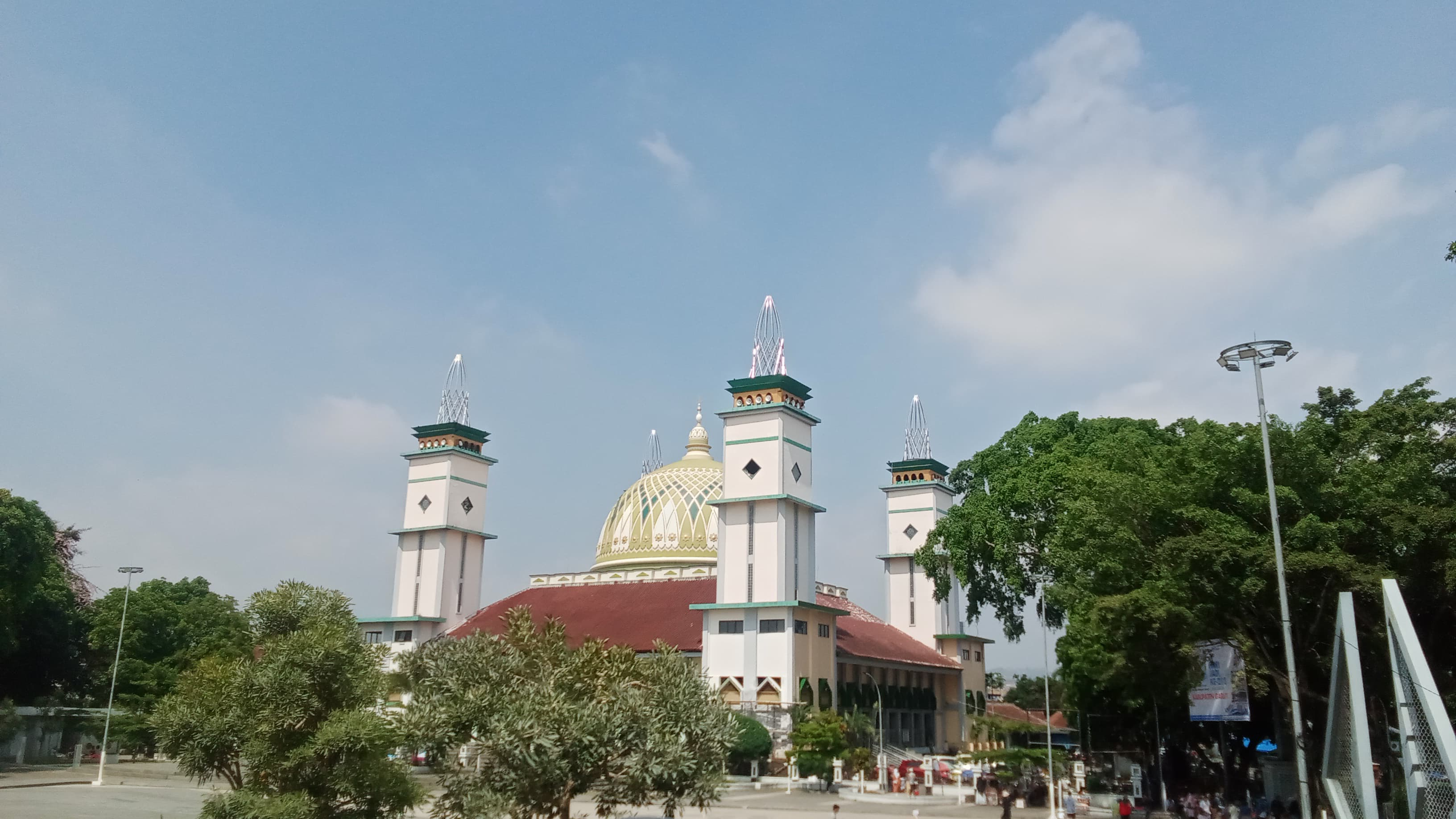
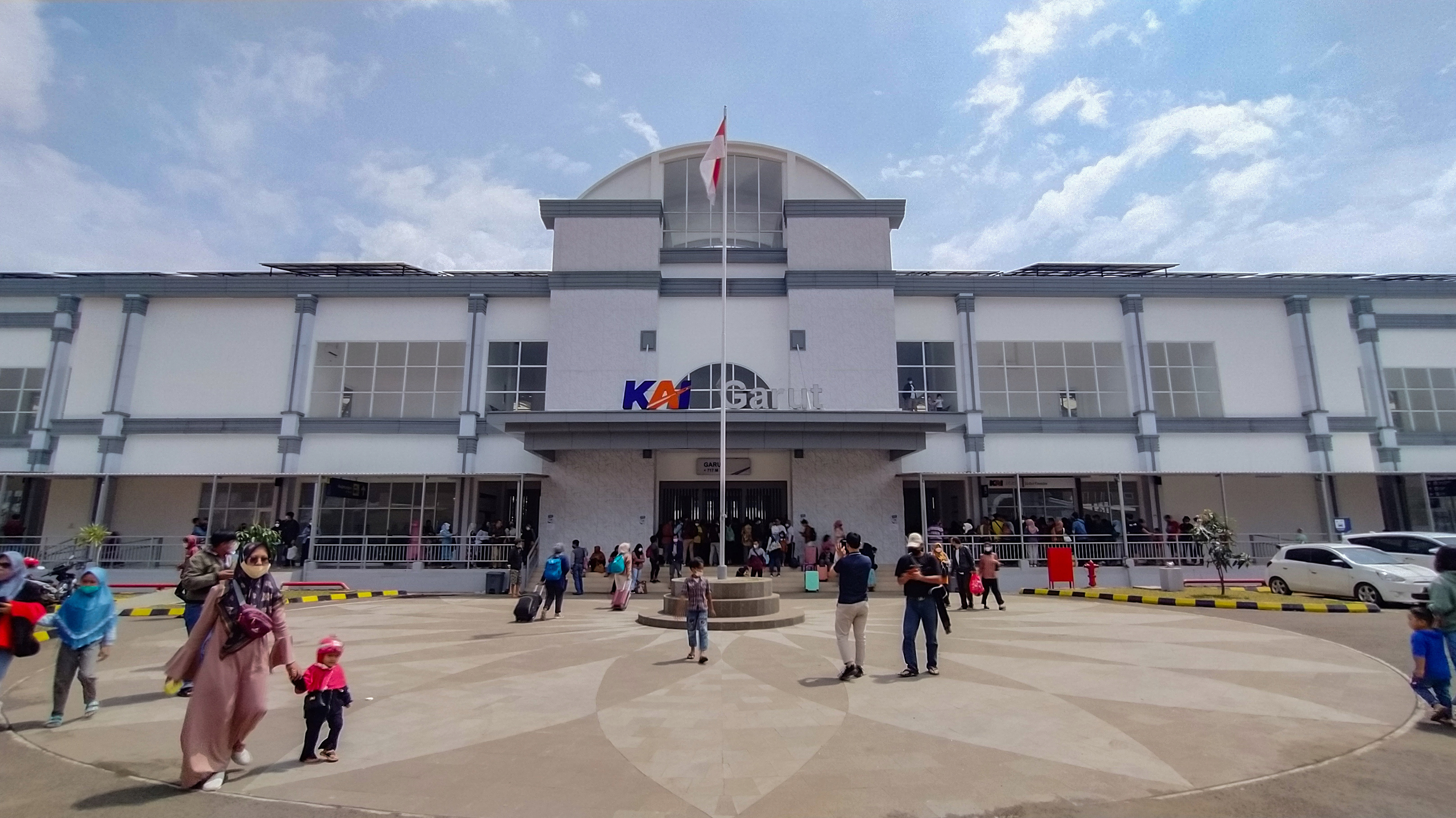
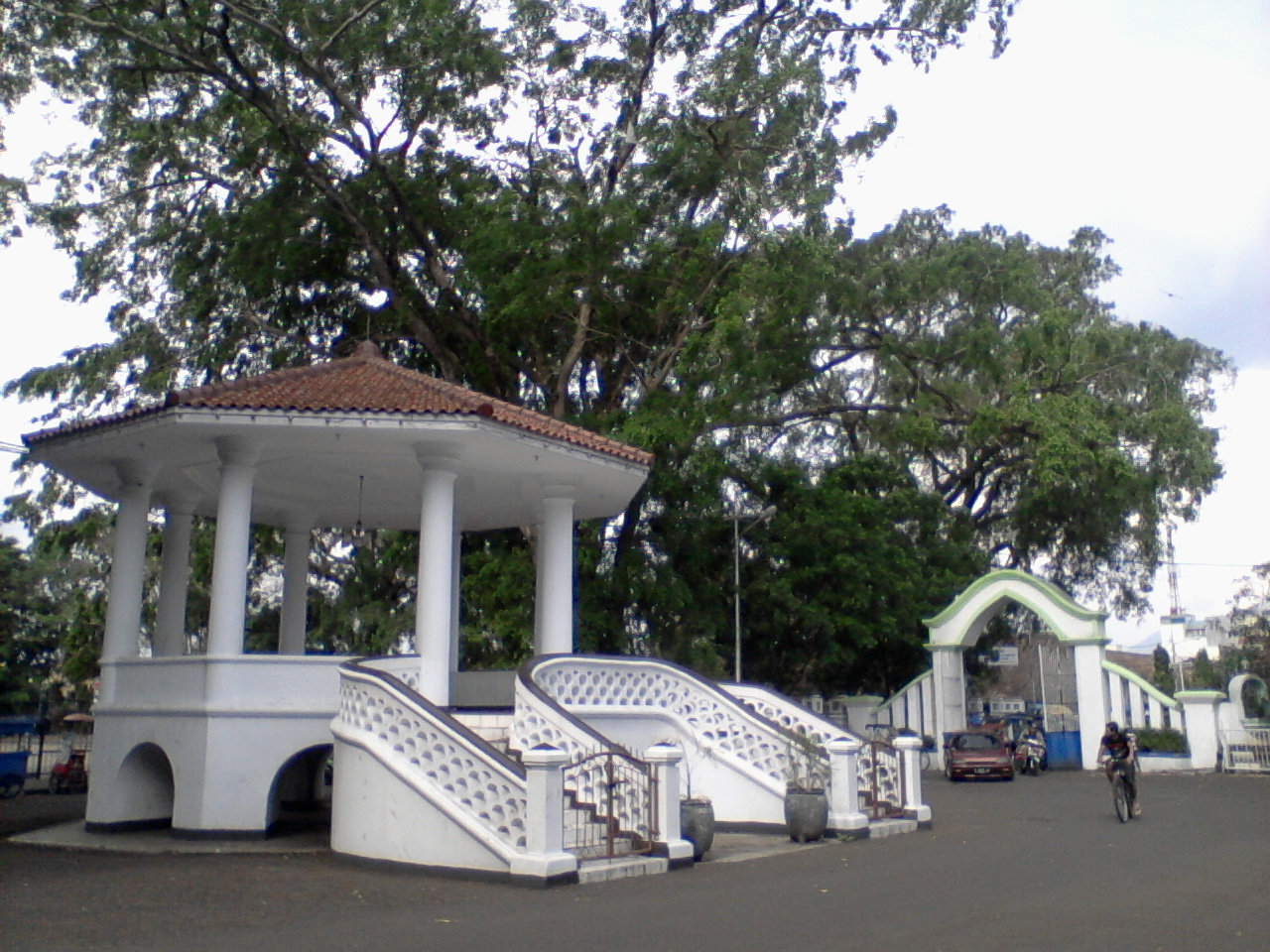
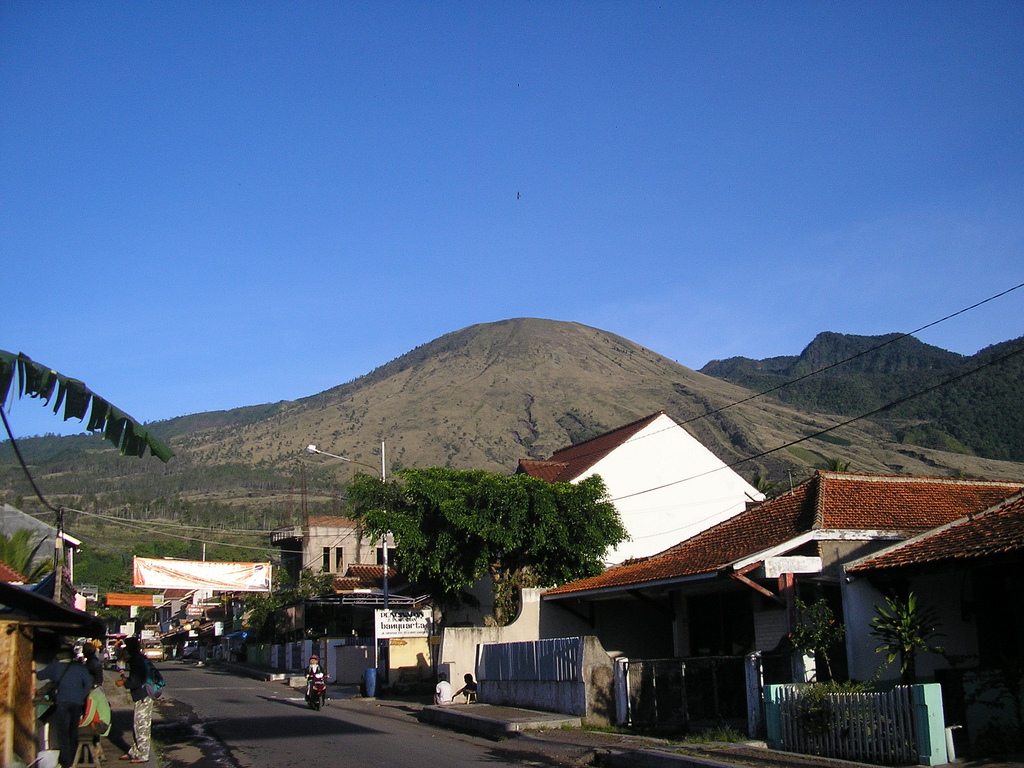
- Clockwise from the top: Great Mosque of Garut, Garut Railway station, Babancong Pavilion, view of Mount Guntur from Garut
- Nicknames: Kota Intan (Diamond City); Zwitserse Van Java (Switzerland of Java)
- Motto: Tata Tengtrem Kerta Raharja
- Location in Java and Indonesia Garut (Indonesia)
- Coordinates: 7°13′S 107°54′E
- Country: Indonesia
- Region: Java
- Province: West Java
- Regency: Garut Regency
- Established: 17 Maret 1813

Area
  - Total: 27.71 km^{2} (10.70 sq mi)
- Elevation: 717 m (2,352 ft)

Population (mid 2024 estimate)
  - Total: 131,809
  - Density: 4,757/km^{2} (12,320/sq mi)
- Time zone: UTC+7 (IWST)
- Area code: (+62) 262

Garut is a district and town in West Java of Indonesia, and the former capital of Garut Regency. It is located about 75 km to the southeast of the major city of Bandung.

== History ==
The modern history of Garut started on March 2, 1811, when the Balubur Limbangan Regency was dissolved by Governor General Herman Willem Daendels because the area's production of coffee had decreased and the Regent, Tumenggung Wangsakusumah II, had refused a command to plant indigo. Balubur Limbangan Regency then comprised six districts: Balubur, Malangbong, Wanaraja, Wanakerta, Cibeureum and Papandak.

The Limbangan Regency, which has now become the Garut Regency, was founded by Lieutenant-Governor Stamford Raffles on February 16, 1813. RAA. Adiwijaya, who governed from the 1813 until 1821, was the first Regent of the Garut Regency. He was well known as Dalem Cipeujueh. The town of Suci was originally the capital of the new Limbangan Regency. However it was thought that Suci did not meet the requirements of a capital because the area was crowded and quite narrow.

Regarding this matter, Regent Limbangan Adipati Adiwijaya formed a committee to find a suitable place for the capital of the Regency. In the beginning, the committee found Cimurah, about 3 km to the East Suci (currently the village is known by the name of Pidayeuheun Village). However, in this place clean water was difficult to obtain so the place not regarded as suitable to become the capital. The committee then decided that a suitable place was about 5 km to west of Suci. In addition to fertile land, the place has a spring that flows to the River Cimanuk and is surrounded by mountains, like Mount Cikuray, Mount Papandayan, Mount Guntur, Mount Galunggung, Mount Talaga Bodas, Kandangwesi and Mount Karacak.

When the site was first found, there was a spring nearby that was said to have been surrounded by a small pond closed off by thorny scrub. According to local stories, one person in the group had his hands badly scratched by the thorns. A European in the team asked about the bleeding and was told that the problem was "kakarut!" The answer was misheard by the European visitor as "gagarut" rather than "kakarut". Team members of the committee thus named the thorny plant "Ki Garut" and the pond was named "Ci Garut" (the location of this pond now was occupied by SLTPI, SLTPII, and SLTP IV Garut buildings). The area around the pond was named "Garut". The name of "Garut" was approved by Regent (of Limbangan Regency) Adipati Adiwijaya to be the Capital of the Limbangan Regency.

On September 15, 1813, the development of capital facilities and infrastructure, such as residence, the hall, office assistant resident, mosques, and square was started. In front of the hall, between the town square and the hall was gotten by "Babancong" where the Regent as well as the official of the other government gave the speech in front of the public. After the place was completed earlier, the Capital of the Limbangan Regency moved from Suci to Garut around 1821. Based on the Governor General Decree No: 60 dated May 7, 1913, the name of the Limbangan Regency was replaced by "Garut Regency", with the town of Garut becoming the capital on July 1, 1913. At that time, the Regent was RAA is Wiratanudatar (1871–1915). Garut district at that time covered the three villages of Kota Kulon (West City) village, the Kota Wetan (East City) Village, and Margawati Village. The Garut Regency covered the districts of Bayongbong, Cibatu, Tarogong, Leles, Balubur Limbangan, Cikajang, Pakenjeng, Bungbulang and Pameungpeuk. In the year 1915, RAA Wiratanudatar replaced by his nephew of Adipati Suria Karta Legawa (1915–1929). On August 14, 1925, a decision based on the Governor General, Garut Regency government passed a law giving stand-alone status (autonomy) to the town.

Gallery

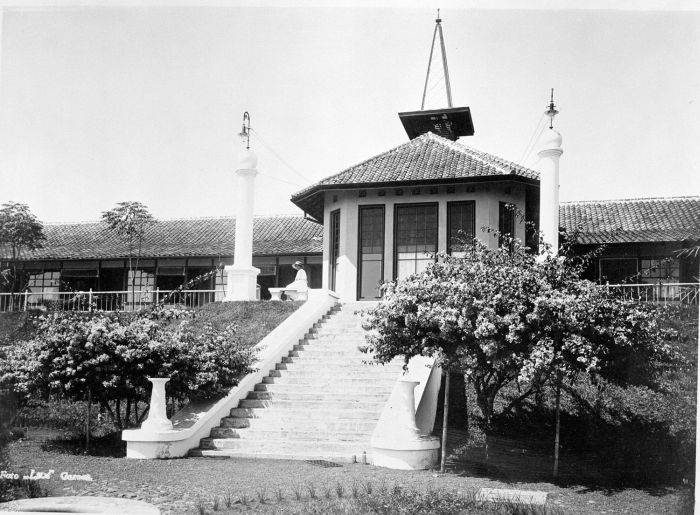
The sanatorium of Garut in the 1920s

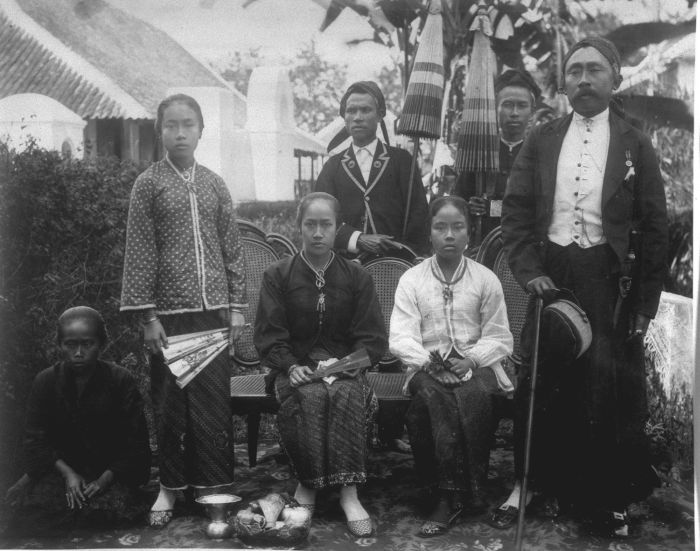
The Regent of Garut, Raden Adipati Aria Wiratanudatar VII, with his wife RA Lasminingrat (sitting) and his family.

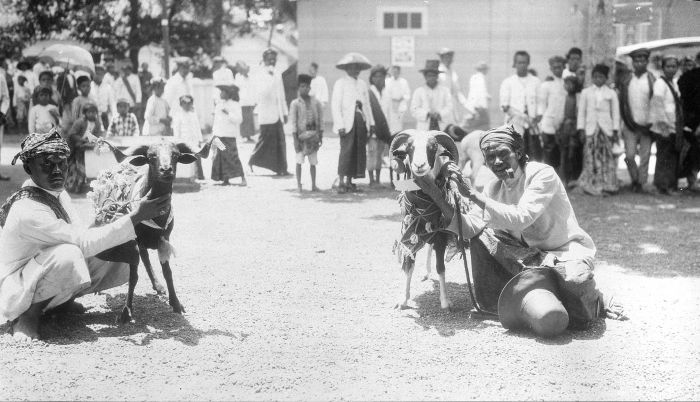
Goat fights in Garut (1921)

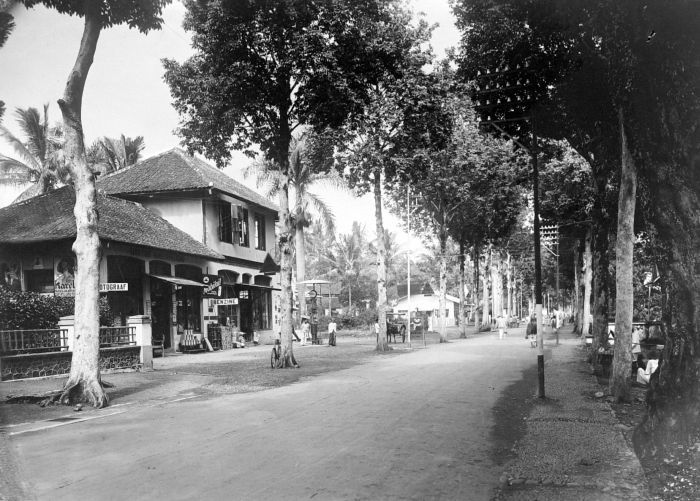
The main street of Garut in 1936

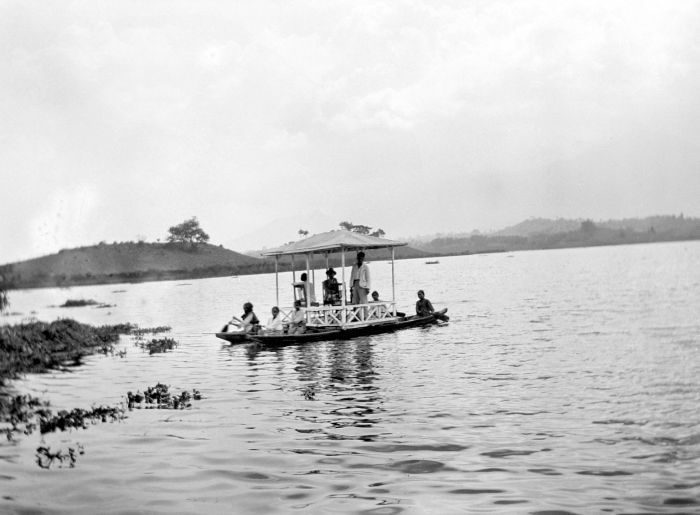
Lake Bagendit in Garut, 1932

== Tourism and incidents ==
Garut was of importance even before World War II, being a hill station for the Dutch elite of the region.

The Danish writer Johannes V. Jensen accounted his visit to Garut in the short story Paa Java from 1915. The legendary film star Charlie Chaplin is said to have visited Garut twice. He is reported to have visited in 1927 and 1935, staying at the Grand Hotel Ngamplang in Cilawu region, a hilly resort around 3.4 kilometers from the city center.

More recently, Garut is a centre of tourism in the region south of Bandung for hiking, hot spas, nearby lakes and villages, and so on. Nearby sites include the following:

- Mount Papandayan, about 15 km to the southwest of Garut.
- The Kamojang crater, a geothermal field and tourist spot, is located on the slopes of Mount Guntur approximately 25 km to the northwest of Garut.

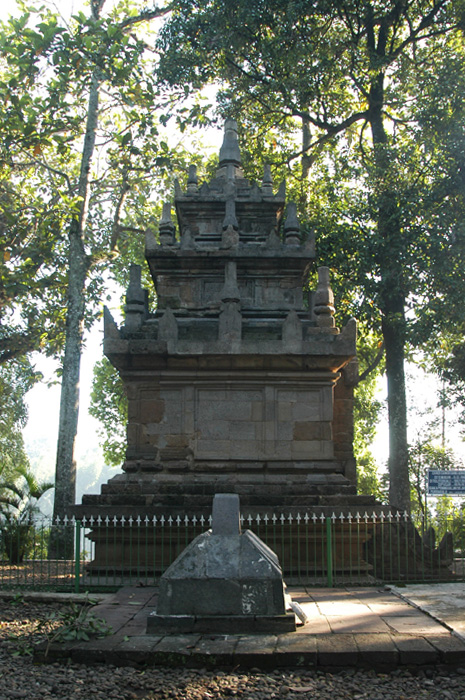
Cangkuang Hindu temple is located 10 km north of Garut.

- The Cangkuang Hindu temple, near the village of Leles, is around 10 km towards the north of the town of Garut on the road to Bandung. The temple, said to have been built during the period of the Galuh Sundanese kingdom in the 8th century, is one of the few Hindu sites in West Java. The restored temple is on the edge of Cangkuang lake where there is a campsite and a few bungalows.
- Curug Orok, a group of waterfalls (curug in Indonesian).
- Masjid Asy-Syuro is a mosque that has an art-deco architecture. Therefore, this mosque looks like a church because of its architectural style. This is a conserved building in Garut. Built in 1934 and finished in 1936. It consists of a hall, a "mimbar", and a tower. This building has a thick wall and stone decoration at its lower part. This mosque is located at Kampung Cipari, Desa Sukarasa, Kecamatan Pangatikan (previously Wanaraja). This building had been functioned as a shelter and fortress while a civil and political conflict of Darul Islam or Tentara Islam Indonesia movement. Now this mosque is still used as a normal mosque for praying and a center of Pesantren Cipari, a traditional and modern Islamic boarding school complex.
- Kawah Talaga Bodas, a with and cyan crater.
- Kebun Mawar Situhapa, a rose plantation garden at the District of Samarang.
- Kampung Bali, a gallery of ancient heritage such as Keris, Tombak, Script, Jewelry, etc. This place is located at District of Cibatu.
- Taman Satwa Cikembulan, a mini zoo and kids play ground at the District of Leles, about 1 kilometer from Situ Cangkuang.
- Desa Wisata Domba or also known as De Wisdom. This is a tourism spot with Sheep/Lamb theme.
- Karacak Valley, is a camping site at Mount Karacak.
- Darajat Pass, a hot spring pools spot at the hill of Kamojang, This place is located at District of Samarang.
- Cipanas Tarogong is a village with so many hotels and hot spring pools at the District of Tarogong.
- Sukaregang Leather Home Industry Center, a perfect spot for shopping leather products with affordable price. This place is located at the District of Garut Kota.

To facilitate the tourists who want to explore Garut tourism destination, there are tour operator companies who can be contacted.

== Local foods ==
- Dodol is among the famous local cuisines from Garut. Dodol is made from rice flour, glutinous rice flour, brown sugar, and coconut milk. Dodol, which is popular because it is sweet and sticky, is prepared with many different fruit flavours.
- Dorokdok (Skin Crackers). Dorokdok is usually made from dried Water Buffalo's skin. The only way to make it is to fry the dried skin. Dorokdok is popular because it is crunchy and salty.
- Burayot made of Brown sugar and Chosen rice flour. The ingredients and taste are same as that found in other versions of the regional specialty known as "Ali Agrem" but because burayot is round and wrinkled (or "ngaburayot" in Sundanese) it called burayot. Burayot is produced in the region around the small township of Leles to the north of Garut because the ingredients are easily available in the area.
- Chocodot is a mixture of Chocolate and Dodol. It is a new emerging brand for souvenir snack from Garut.
- Rangginang is a kind of chips made from a processed rice called ketan. Its salty and crunchy.
- Dapros is a kind of colorful chips with a bloom rose shape.
- Leupeut is another kind of rice. Packed with banana leave. It is often used as a substitution of rice while traveling.

== Volcanoes ==
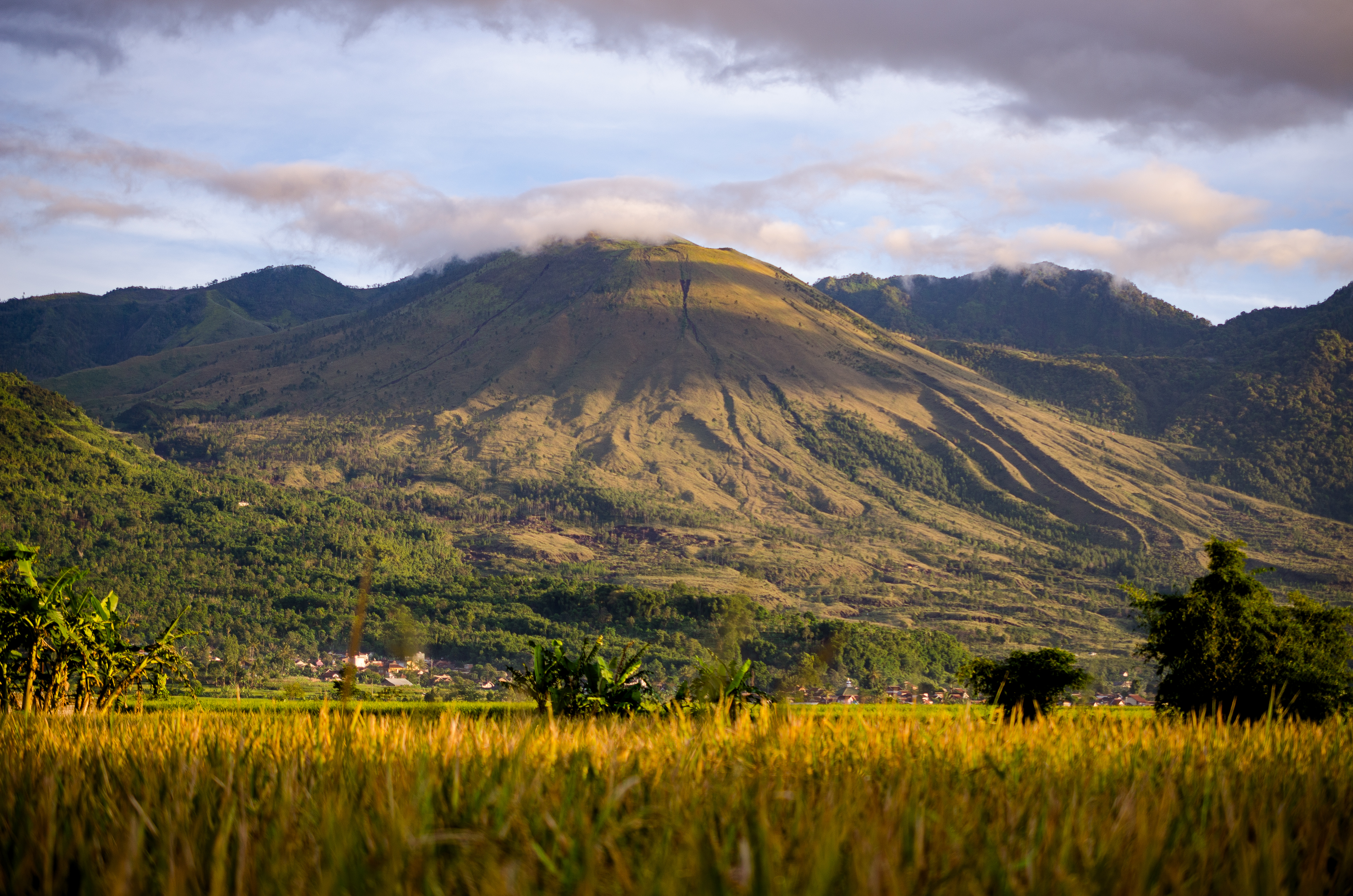
Mount Guntur, 10 km from the city of Garut

Garut is in a valley surrounded by various volcanoes. The most well known is Mount Galunggung which experienced a major eruption in 1982. Following the eruption, over 60 people died and much damage was done to the agricultural sector and infrastructure in the region. Other nearby volcanoes are Mount Talagabodas (around 2,200 metres), Mount Guntur (around 2,250 metres), and Mount Cikurai (over 2,900 metres).

== Beaches ==
In the south of Garut Regency there are more than 10 beaches. The most well known beaches are Santolo Beach at Cikelet district and Sayang Heulang Beach, the others are Cilauteureun, Rancabuaya, Taman Manalusu, Cijayana, Karang Paranje, Sancang, Gunung Geder, Pantai Cijeruk Indah, Karang Tepas or Sodong parat. They are located 94 kilometres from Garut town and spread along 72 kilometres of the south coast. Franz Wilhelm Junghuhn in the colonial era plotted the beaches. Now, since 2006 Gunung Geder Beach is boosted by the Indonesian government to be a new tourist site. Gunung Geder Beach with 7 kilometres of beach has white sand near the sea and brownish sand far the sea. An alternative route besides that through Garut is through Ciwidey and Rancabali.

== Greater Garut ==
The urban area of Garut town (Kota) extends into three adjacent districts, with a combined area of about 150 km^{2} and an official estimated population of just over 500,000 in mid 2024.

District	Area in km^{2}	Pop'n 2010 census	Pop'n 2020 census	Pop'n mid 2024 estimate	Admin centre	No. of Villages	Post code
Tarogong Kidul	19.46	108,192	114,965	120,031	Sukakarya	12	44150
Tarogong Kaler	50.57	84,843	95,942	102,612	Cimanganten	13	44151
Kota Garut	27.71	126,452	127,583	131,809	Pakuwon	11	44111: 44119
Karangpawitan	52.07	116,833	135,814	146,814	Sindanglaya	20	44182
Totals	149.81	436,320	474,304	501,266		56	

== Notes ==
- Witton, Patrick (2003). Indonesia (7th ed.). Melbourne: Lonely Planet. p. 166. ISBN 1-74059-154-2.
- See Official website of Garut Regency for useful details and links.
