= Kandangwesi =

Ancient royal heritage area in southern Garut

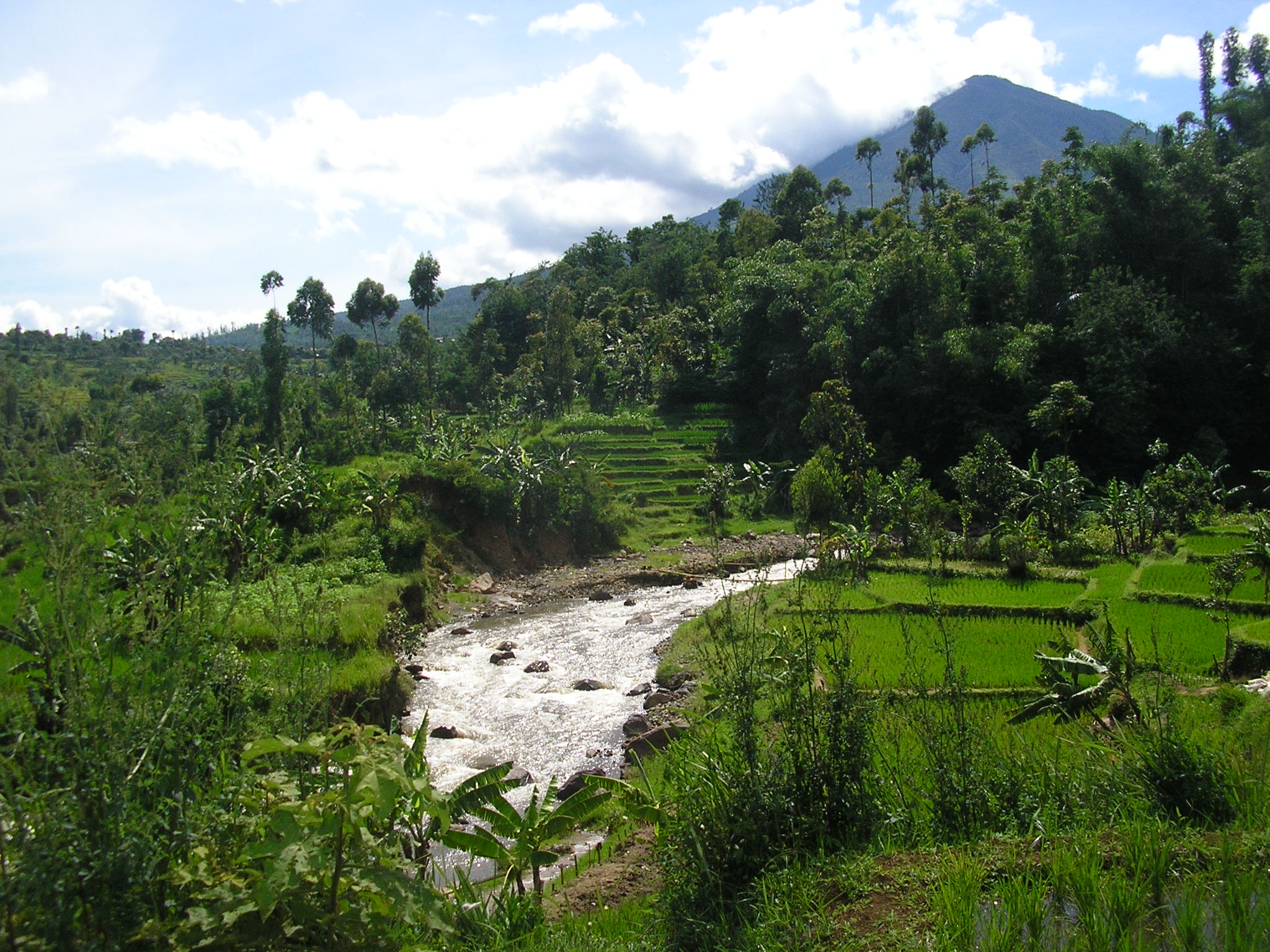
Kandangwesi in Garut.

Kandangwesi is an ancient royal heritage area in southern Garut (Garut Regency, West Java province, Indonesia) Kandangwesi include Bungbulang district, Pakenjeng district, Pamulihan district, Caringin district, Mekarmukti district, Cisewu district, Talegong district and Selaawi district.
