= Great Mosque of Garut =

Mosque in Garut, West Java, Indonesia

Masjid Agung Garut Great Mosque of Garut
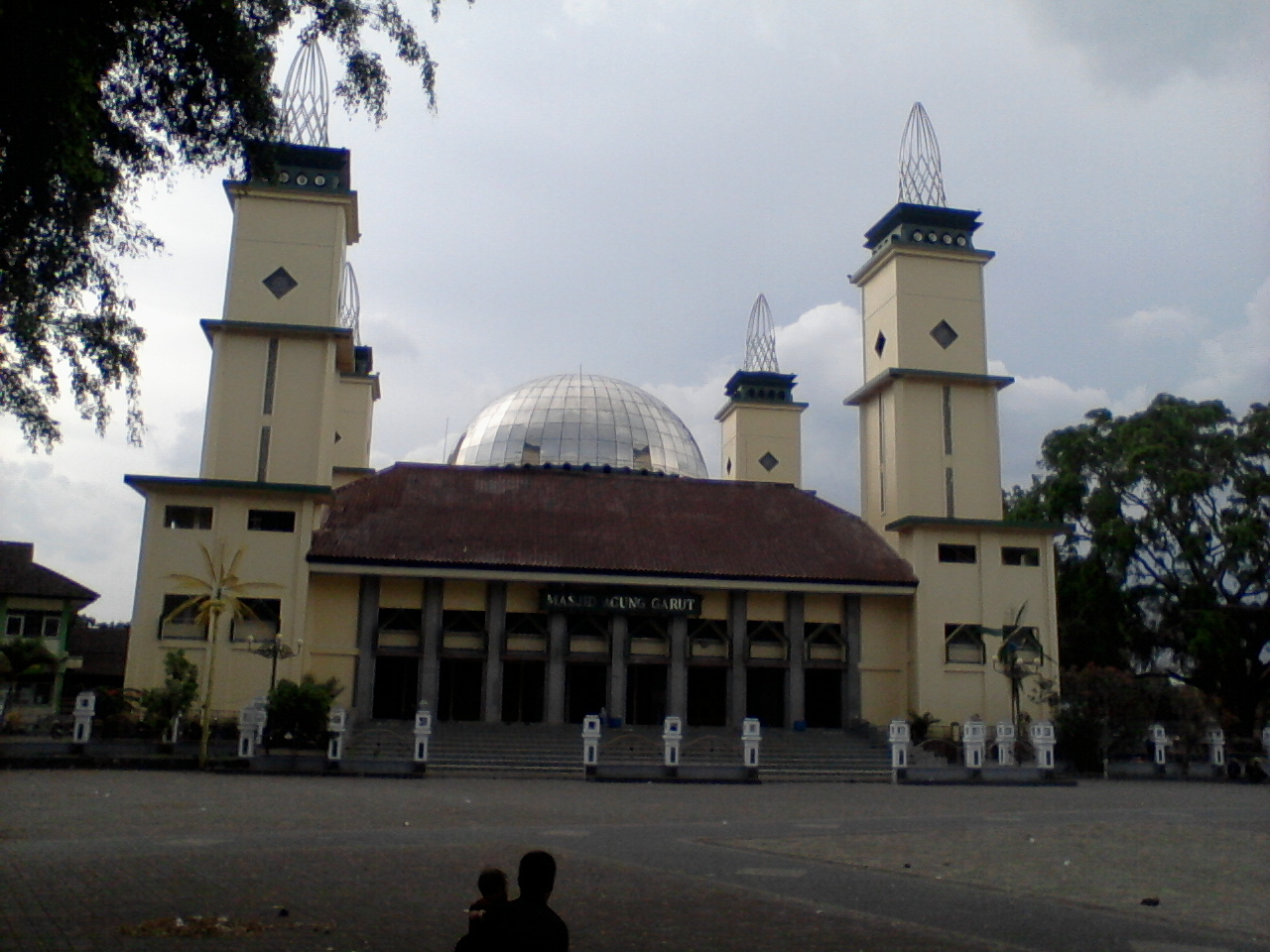
- Outer look since the 1998 renovation

- Location within Java Location within Indonesia

Religion
- Affiliation: Islam
- Branch/tradition: Sunni

Location
- Location: Garut, Garut Regency, West Java, Indonesia
- Interactive map of Masjid Agung Garut; Great Mosque of Garut
- Coordinates: 7°12′58″S 107°54′03″E

Architecture
- Type: Mosque
- Style: Dutch colonial style (1813-1949); Traditional Javanese style (1949-1979) Contemporary Javanese style (1979-)
- Groundbreaking: September 15, 1813
- Completed: 1949 (first renovation); 1979 (second renovation); 1998 (third renovation)

Specifications
- Dome: 1
- Minaret: 4

The Great Mosque of Garut is a historical congregational mosque in the city of Garut, Garut Regency, West Java, Indonesia. The mosque is one of the oldest mosques in the region, first constructed on September 15, 1813 by the Dutch colonial representatives in the Priangan. The mosque was renovated three times in 1949, 1979, and 1998 into a traditional Javanese Islamic architectural style with sloped roofs.

== Description ==
=== Initial construction ===
The regional capital of the Garut area was moved from Balubur Limbangan to the current area, and the Dutch colonial government initiated four infrastructure development plans, among which was the construction of the mosque. The Dutch constructed the pavilion building (the Babancong), the residence of the regent, the office of the regent assistant (the present-day Bakorwil building), as well as the prison building in the vicinity of the mosque.

The construction of the mosque was initiated by the Regent Wira Tanu Datar VII who held power until 1815, and succeeded by Musa Suria Kertalegawa who came to power in 1829. By the time, the mosque became a center of activities for the local religious community.

=== Renovation ===
The initial construction was intended for five-times daily prayers, but as the development continued, and the popularization of pesantren (Islamic boarding school) culture, the mosque began to hold Friday Prayers, Eid prayers and other congregational religious activities.

To accommodate this, the mosque was renovated in 1949, with a fresh outer look based on the Javanese Mataram Islamic architecture. The characteristics of the renovated style were the three-level roofs soaring upward. The mosque was renovated again in 1979 and a dome was installed.

The third renovation was initiated on November 10, 1994, and completed on August 25, 1998. For the third renovation, the current governor of West Java Ridwan Kamil, who back then was an assistant professor of the Bandung Institute of Technology, was involved as an architect. Ridwan Kamil was assigned to deploy a satellite technology to determine the direction of Qibla. It was an assignment he directly received from his lecturer and was one of his first mosque projects. The third renovation has also widened the courtyard which is being used today for bazaar during Islamic events and the regional government's official ceremonies.

=== Religious education ===
Since Ramadan in 1983, the mosque has been holding pesantren kilat or an Islamic boarding school program for a limited duration of time. The mosque has been a popular place for children's basic religious education such as Qur'anic recitation. It also opened a program for university students.

== Gallery ==
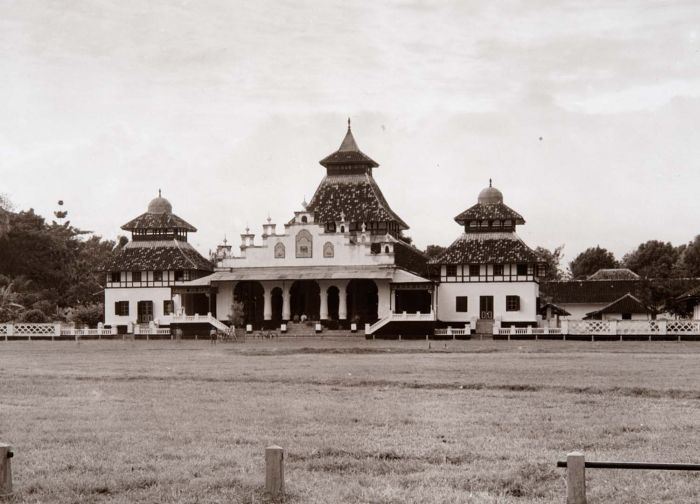
The initial Dutch colonial style

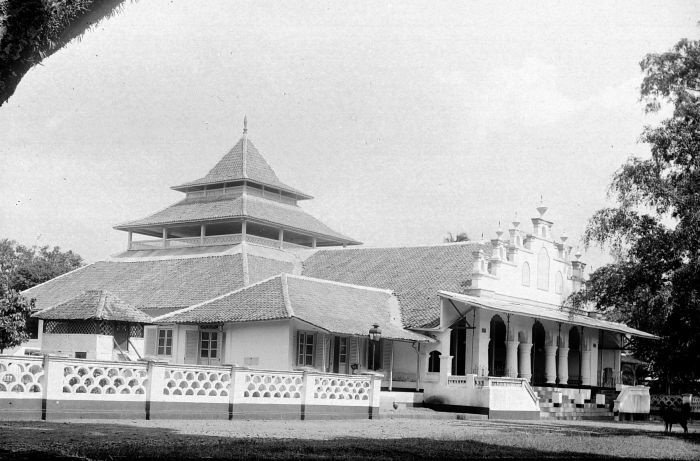
Javanese style since the 1949 renovation
