= Mount Kamojang =

Geothermal field and tourist spot in West Java, Indonesia

Kamojang
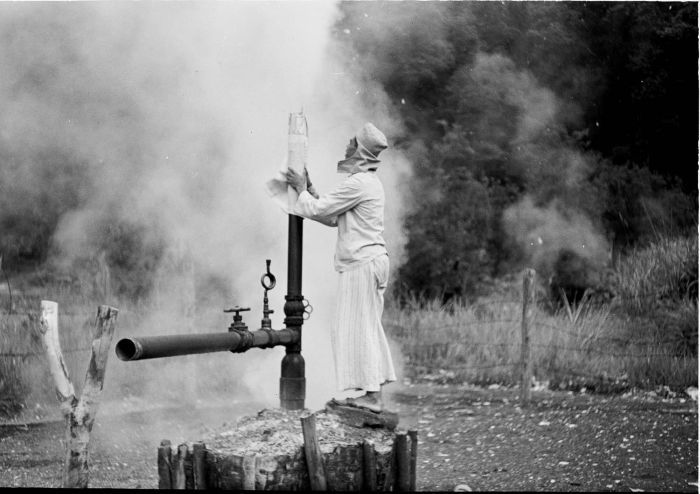
- Work at Kawah Kamojang in 1935

Highest point
- Elevation: 1,730 m (5,680 ft)
- Coordinates: 7°07′30″S 107°48′00″E

Geography
- Location within Java Location within Indonesia
- Location: Java, Indonesia

Geology
- Mountain type: stratovolcano
- Volcanic arc: Sunda Arc
- Last eruption: Pleistocene

Mount Kamojang, popularly known as Kawah Kamojang (Kamojang crater), is a volcano containing a geothermal field and tourist spot in West Java, Indonesia. The crater is located in district (kecamatan) Ibun in the Bandung Regency, approximately 45 km to the southeast of Bandung through the towns of Majalaya and Ibun. The crater can also be reached from the opposite direction through the town of Garut, in Garut Regency (the distance by road from Garut to the northwest through the township of Samarang is around 25 km).

The volcano that the crater is located around Mount Guntur but the crater itself is listed as an independent active volcano of Indonesia because of its geothermal activities.

== Geothermal activities ==
Kamojang Geothermal Power Plant Complex
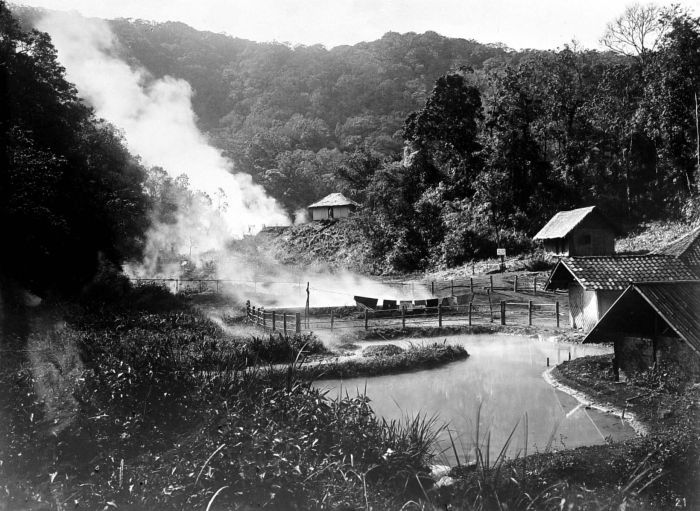
- Country: Indonesia
- Location: Garut, West Java
- Coordinates: 7°07′30″S 107°48′00″E
- Status: Operational
- Commission date: 1983(Unit 1); 1987 (Unit 2 & 3); 2008 (Unit 4); 2015 (Unit 5)
- Operator: PT Pertamina Geothermal Energy Tbk
- Site elevation: 1,730 m (5,680 ft)

Power generation
- Units operational: 5
- Nameplate capacity: 235 MW: 1 × 30 MW (Unit 2); 2 × 55 MW (Unit 2 & 3); 1 × 60 MW (Unit 4); 1 × 35 MW (Unit 5)

External links
- Commons: Related media on Commons

There is a long history of interest in the possibility of developing the geothermal potential of the Kamojang region. The first geothermal wells in Indonesia were drilled at Kamojang in 1926 by the Dutch colonial government. The current geothermal field is on the slopes of Mt Guntur, about 7 km to the west of the peak of the mountain. There are four operating geothermal generating units with a capacity of 200 MW. The fourth unit began operation in January 2013. A fifth unit with a planned capacity of 35 MW was contracted in October 2013 with estimated construction completion by July 2015.

Kamojang is the site of the first modern geothermal site in Indonesia, commissioned by former president Soeharto in January 1983. The 5 current units, with a capacity of 235 MW, are owned and operated by PT Pertamina Geothermal Energy, a subsidiary of Indonesia's major state-owned companies, PT Pertamina.

== See also ==
- List of volcanoes in Indonesia
- Geothermal power in Indonesia
