= 2010 World Geothermal Congress =

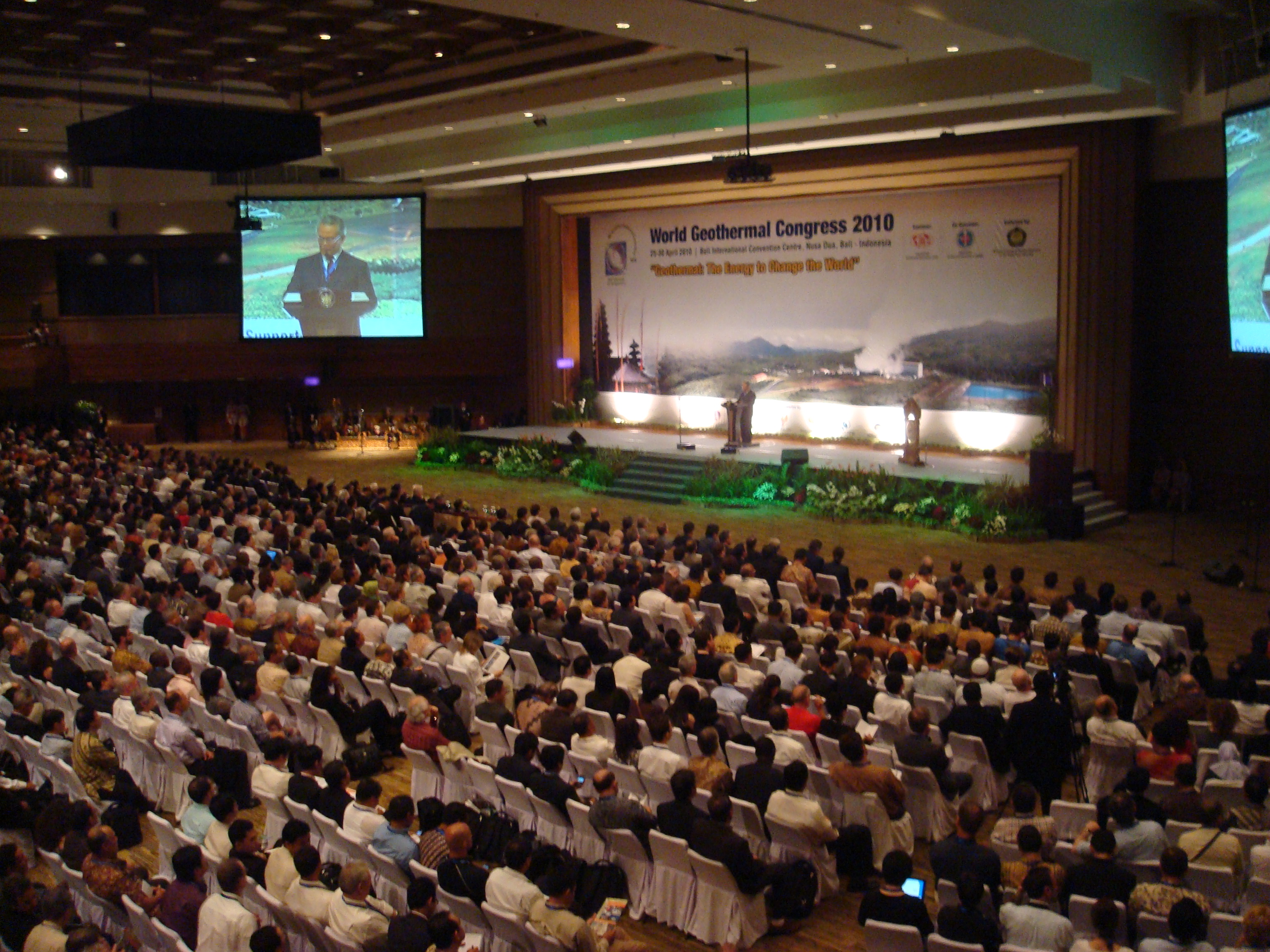
The Bali Conference, 26 April 2010

The 2010 World Geothermal Congress took place between April 25-30, 2010, in Bali, Indonesia. It was called the world's biggest geothermal energy conference.

== History ==
The World Geothermal Congress is organized every five years by the International Geothermal Association. The previous three conferences took place in Florence, Italy (1995), Beppu-Morioka, Japan (2000) and Antalya, Turkey (2005). The one in 2015 took place in Melbourne. There was none in 2020 due to the start of the COVID-19 pandemic, which had begun in March of that same year.

== Bali Conference ==
Attendees from 80 countries were discussing better ways to develop geothermal power as an environmentally friendly energy source which can be harnessed in the future for less cost than it is today.

The Summit was opened by Indonesian president, Susilo Bambang Yudhoyono at Westin Hotel, Nusa Dua, Bali. The opening was marked by the signing of 12 geothermal-related contracts worth in the range of US$5 billion. Among the contracts were agreements between the Indonesian state power firm PT PLN and PT Pertamina Geothermal Energy (PGE) - a geothermal business branch of state oil and gas company PT Pertamina - to develop four geothermal power plants in Sulawesi and Sumatra.

The Congress concluded with over 2,500 participants signing the Bali Declaration "Geothermal Energy to Change the World" during the closing ceremony.

== See also ==
- Geothermal power in Indonesia
