= Sindangratu (Wanaraja) =

- Village
- Location within Indonesia
- Coordinates: 7°10′48″S 107°59′44″E
- Country: Indonesia
- Province: West Java
- Regency: Garut
- District: Wanaraja

Population (2010)
  - Total: 6,542
- Time zone: UTC+8 (WITA)

Sindangratu (Indonesian pronunciation: [sɪndaŋˈrat̪u]) is a village in the Garut Regency, West Java province, Indonesia. This village has a population of 6542 according to the 2010 census.
