= Garut orange =

Variety of fruit

Garut Oranges are a fruit variety grown in the mountains and hilly areas of Java, Indonesia, specifically in the Wanaraja, Samarang and Bayongbong Districts of Garut Regency. These locations feature mountains or hilly areas, with highland elevations of more than 900 m (3,000 ft) above sea level. Many kinds of fruits and vegetables compete for this growing area.

When Indonesia was a Dutch colony, Garut Oranges were considered one of Indonesia's most famous exotic fruits.

Garut Oranges have a good taste, good coloring, thick skin textures, and good aroma. Crops have been significantly damaged by Citrus Vein Phloem Degeneration (CVPD).
