= Garsela =

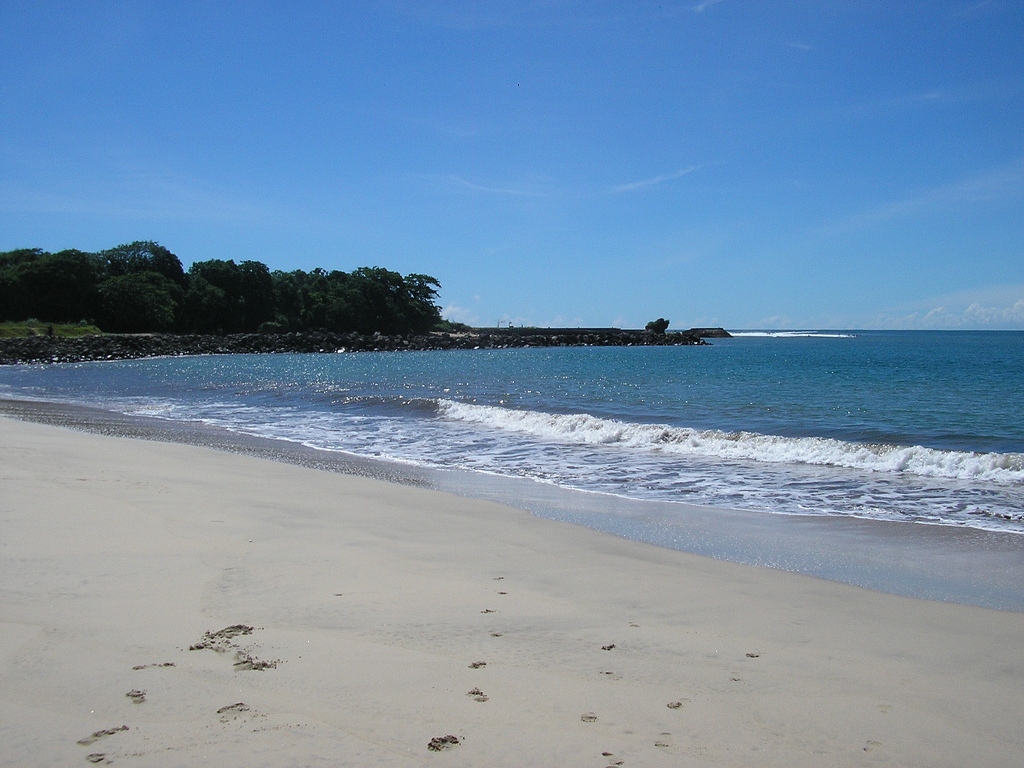
Pameungpeuk in Garut Selatan (Garsela) West Java, Indonesia

Garsela also Garsel or Garut Selatan or South Garut is a region located in the southern part of the Garut Regency, West Java Province, Indonesia. After the creation of a new regency in the West Java province, the city has received approval in 2011 have received as the seat of the provincial government.

The expansion of the Garut Selatan Regency included 327 villages with 15 districts namely Sub Cikajang, Banjarwangi, Cisewu, Talegong, Bungbulang, Pamulihan, Pakenjeng, Cikelet, Pameungpeuk, Cibalong, Cisompet, Pendet, Singajaya, Cibulit, and Mekarmukti with Garut Selatan as the planned district capital. The Port at Santolo Cikelet. The best place for relaxation and tourism is Gunung Geder Beach at Cikelet.
