= Rajabasa =

Stratovolcano at the most southeastern point of Sumatra

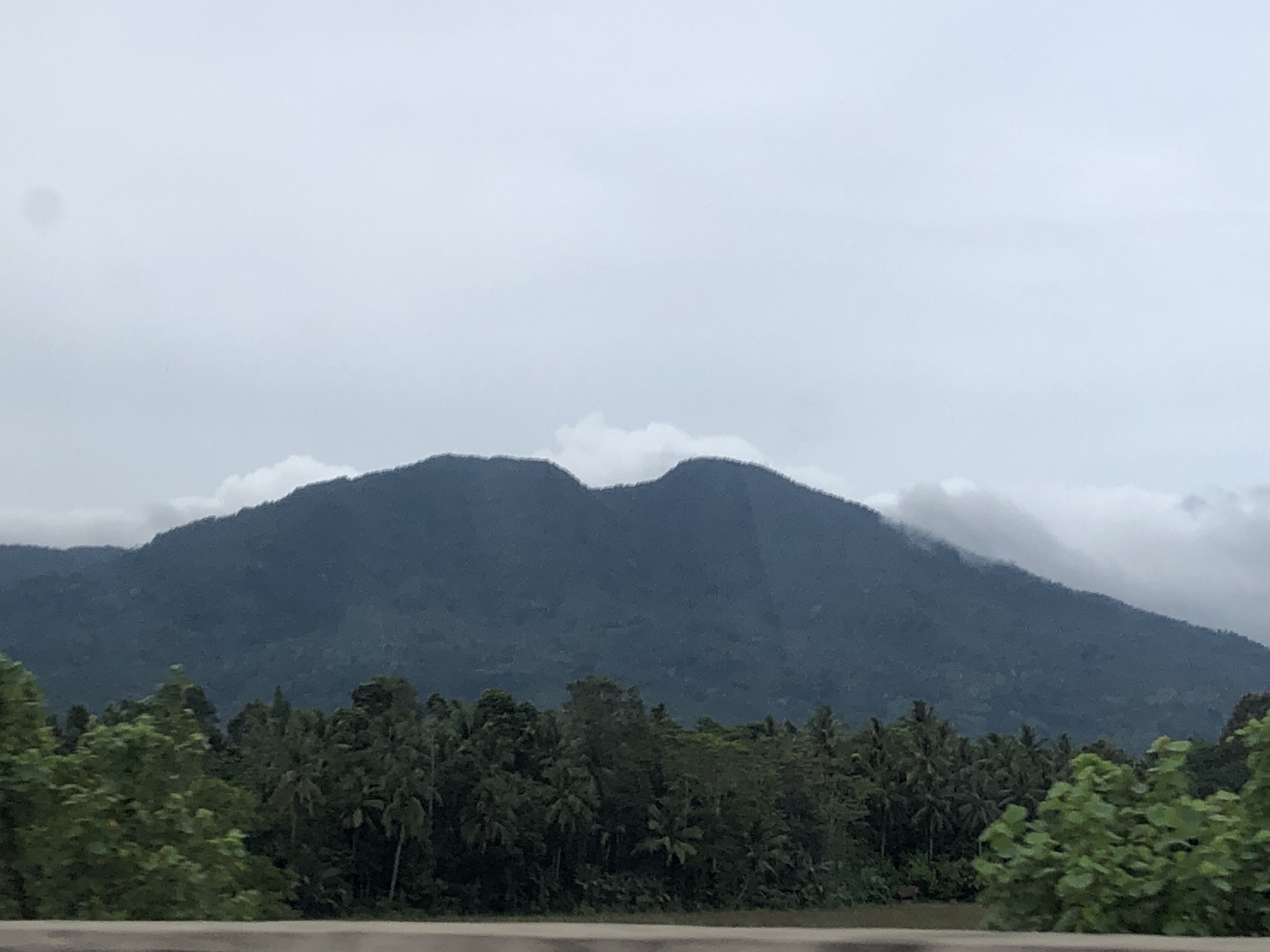

Highest point
- Elevation: 1,281 m (4,203 ft)
- Listing: Ribu
- Coordinates: 05°47′00″S 105°37′30″E

Geography
- Location: Sumatra, Indonesia

Geology
- Mountain type: stratovolcano
- Volcanic arc: Sunda Arc
- Last eruption: Unknown

Rajabasa is an isolated 1281-m-high conical volcano along the Sunda Strait at the most southeastern point of Sumatra. It has a well-preserved 500 x 700 m summit crater with a swampy floor. The volcano is covered with vegetation. Although fumarolic activity occurs on the foot and flanks of the volcano and increased activity was reported in April 1863 and May 1892, it is not known when it last erupted.

The eastern slopes of Mount Rajabasa are part of the Sekampung River Basin. All the watercourses originating from its upper reaches are utilized for agricultural irrigation on the downstream, southern side of the Sekampung River.

== See also ==
- List of volcanoes in Indonesia
