= South Tarogong =

South Tarogong Tarogong Kidul
- District

Regional transcription(s)
  - Sundanese: ᮒᮛᮧᮌᮧᮀ ᮊᮤᮓᮥᮜ᮪
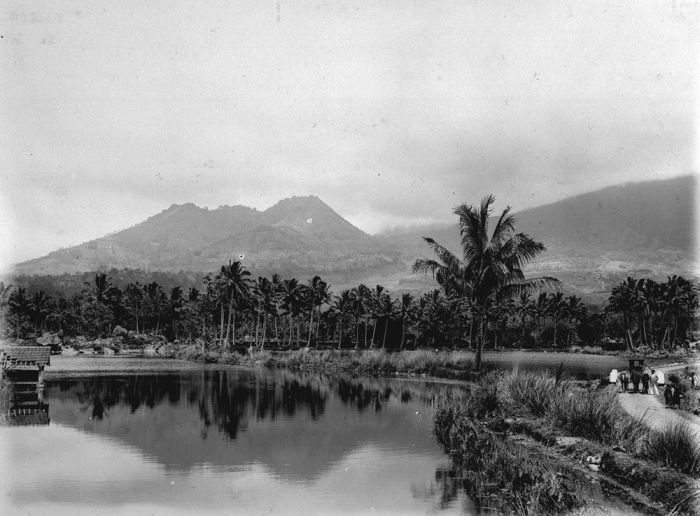
- South Tarogong in the early 20th-century CE

- Location in Java and Indonesia South Tarogong (Indonesia)
- Coordinates: 7°12′54″S 107°53′8″E
- Country: Indonesia
- Province: West Java
- Regency: Garut Regency

Government
  - Camat: Lilis Neti
  - Secretary: Yanti

Area
  - Total: 16.72 km^{2} (6.46 sq mi)
- Elevation: 714 m (2,343 ft)

Population (mid 2024 estimate)
  - Total: 121,219
  - Density: 7,250/km^{2} (18,780/sq mi)
- Time zone: UTC+7 (IWT)
- Postal code: 44150
- Area code: (+62) 262
- Villages: 12
- Website: Official website

South Tarogong (Indonesian: Tarogong Kidul; Sundanese: ᮒᮛᮧᮌᮧᮀ ᮊᮤᮓᮥᮜ᮪) is an administrative district (kecamatan) of Garut Regency which serves as the regency seat. The district was established in 2003 from the more urbanised southern part of the former Tarogong District. It is divided into twelve villages, all sharing the post code of 44150, which are as follows:

Reference Code	Kelurahan or Desa	Area in km^{2}	Pop'n mid 2024 estimate
32.05.05.2011	Kersamenak	1.86	7,814
32.05.05.2005	Cibunar	1.25	5,576
32.05.05.2007	Sukabakti	1.60	4,316
32.05.05.1009	Sukakarya	0.60	5,368
32.05.05.1012	Sukajaya	2.10	15,036
32.05.05.1006	Jayawaras	0.66	11,480
32.05.05.2004	Haurpanggung	1.31	14,971
32.05.05.2003	Jayaraga	1.30	14,035
32.05.05.1001	Pataruman	0.72	9,192
32.05.05.1002	Sukagalih	2.34	17,647
32.05.05.2010	Mekargalih	2.23	9,575
32.05.05.2008	Tarogong	9.76	6,209
32.05.05	Totals	16.72	121,219

Of the twelve villages, five (Jayawaras, Pataruman, Sukagalih, Sukakarya and Sukajaya) are classed as urban kelurahan and seven are classed as rural desa.

== Climate ==
Tarogong has an elevation moderated tropical monsoon climate (Am) with moderate rainfall from June to September and heavy rainfall from October to May.

Climate data for Tarogong
Month	Jan	Feb	Mar	Apr	May	Jun	Jul	Aug	Sep	Oct	Nov	Dec	Year
Mean daily maximum °C (°F)	27.0 (80.6)	27.2 (81.0)	27.5 (81.5)	27.7 (81.9)	27.7 (81.9)	27.2 (81.0)	26.7 (80.1)	27.2 (81.0)	27.8 (82.0)	28.2 (82.8)	27.6 (81.7)	27.3 (81.1)	27.4 (81.4)
Daily mean °C (°F)	22.9 (73.2)	22.9 (73.2)	23.1 (73.6)	23.3 (73.9)	23.2 (73.8)	23.3 (73.9)	21.7 (71.1)	21.9 (71.4)	22.5 (72.5)	23.2 (73.8)	23.0 (73.4)	23.0 (73.4)	22.8 (73.1)
Mean daily minimum °C (°F)	18.9 (66.0)	18.7 (65.7)	18.8 (65.8)	18.9 (66.0)	18.7 (65.7)	17.5 (63.5)	16.8 (62.2)	16.7 (62.1)	17.2 (63.0)	18.2 (64.8)	18.5 (65.3)	18.8 (65.8)	18.1 (64.7)
Average rainfall mm (inches)	275 (10.8)	243 (9.6)	302 (11.9)	226 (8.9)	168 (6.6)	92 (3.6)	78 (3.1)	56 (2.2)	67 (2.6)	148 (5.8)	232 (9.1)	284 (11.2)	2,171 (85.4)
Source: Climate-Data.org
