= Mount Guntur =

Active stratovolcano in western Java

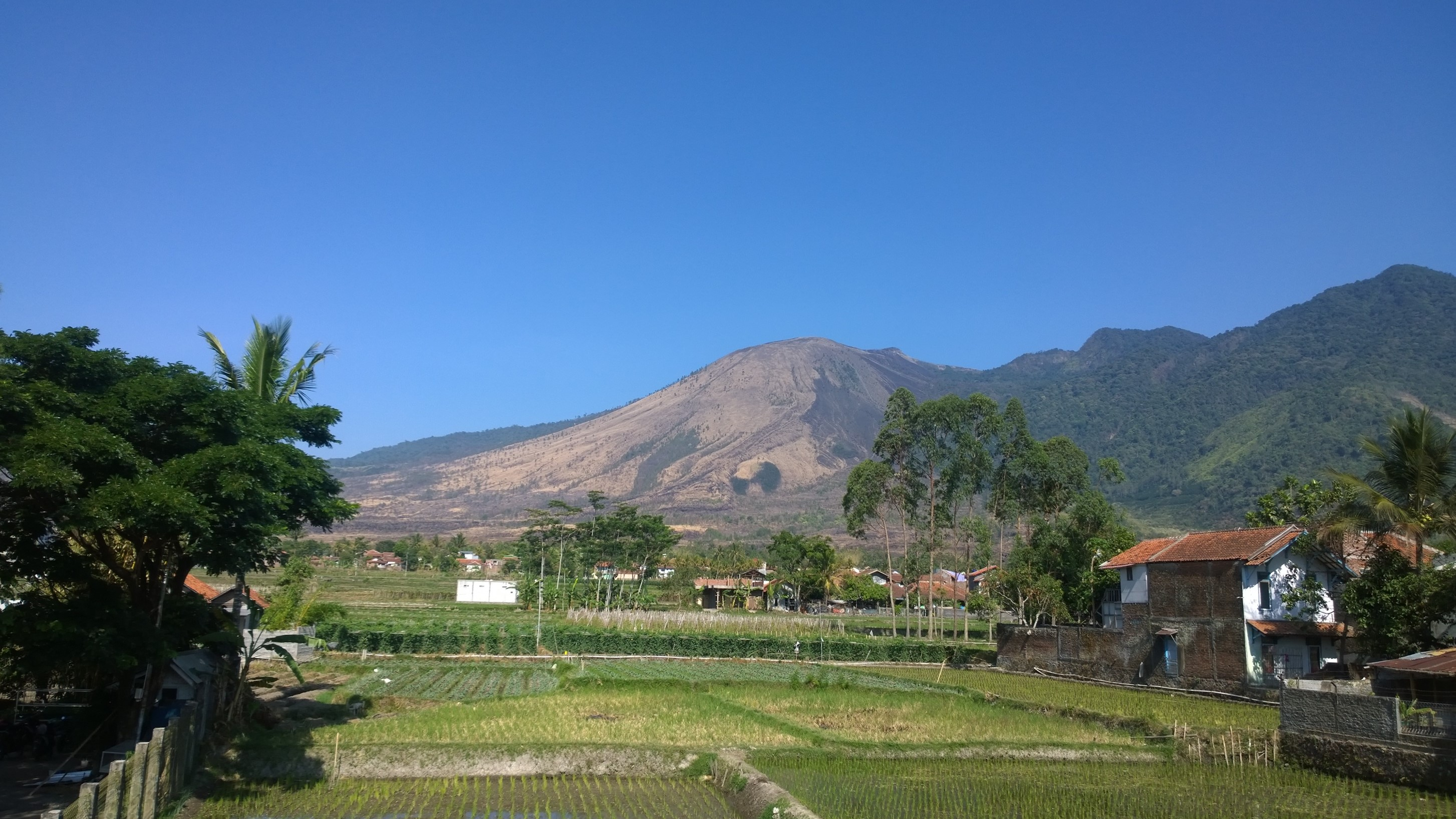
- Mount Guntur, seen from Tarogong Kaler

Highest point
- Elevation: 2,249 m (7,379 ft)
- Listing: Ribu
- Coordinates: 7°08′35″S 107°50′24″E

Geography
- Location within Java Location within Indonesia
- Location: West Java, Indonesia

Geology
- Mountain type: Stratovolcano
- Volcanic arc: Sunda Arc
- Last eruption: October 1847

Mount Guntur (Indonesian: Gunung Guntur) is an active stratovolcano in western Java. However, since the 19th century, it has not erupted. The name Guntur means "thunder" in the Sundanese language. Mt. Guntur has the biggest volcanic product coverage area in the western segment of Java Island.

The Kamojang crater, a geothermal power field and a tourist site, is located on the slopes of Mount Guntur.

== See also ==
- List of volcanoes in Indonesia
