= Garut Regency =

Regency in West Java, Indonesia

Garut Regency Kabupaten Garut
- Regency

Other transcription(s)
  - Sundanese: ᮊᮘᮥᮕᮒᮦᮔ᮪ ᮌᮛᮥᮒ᮪
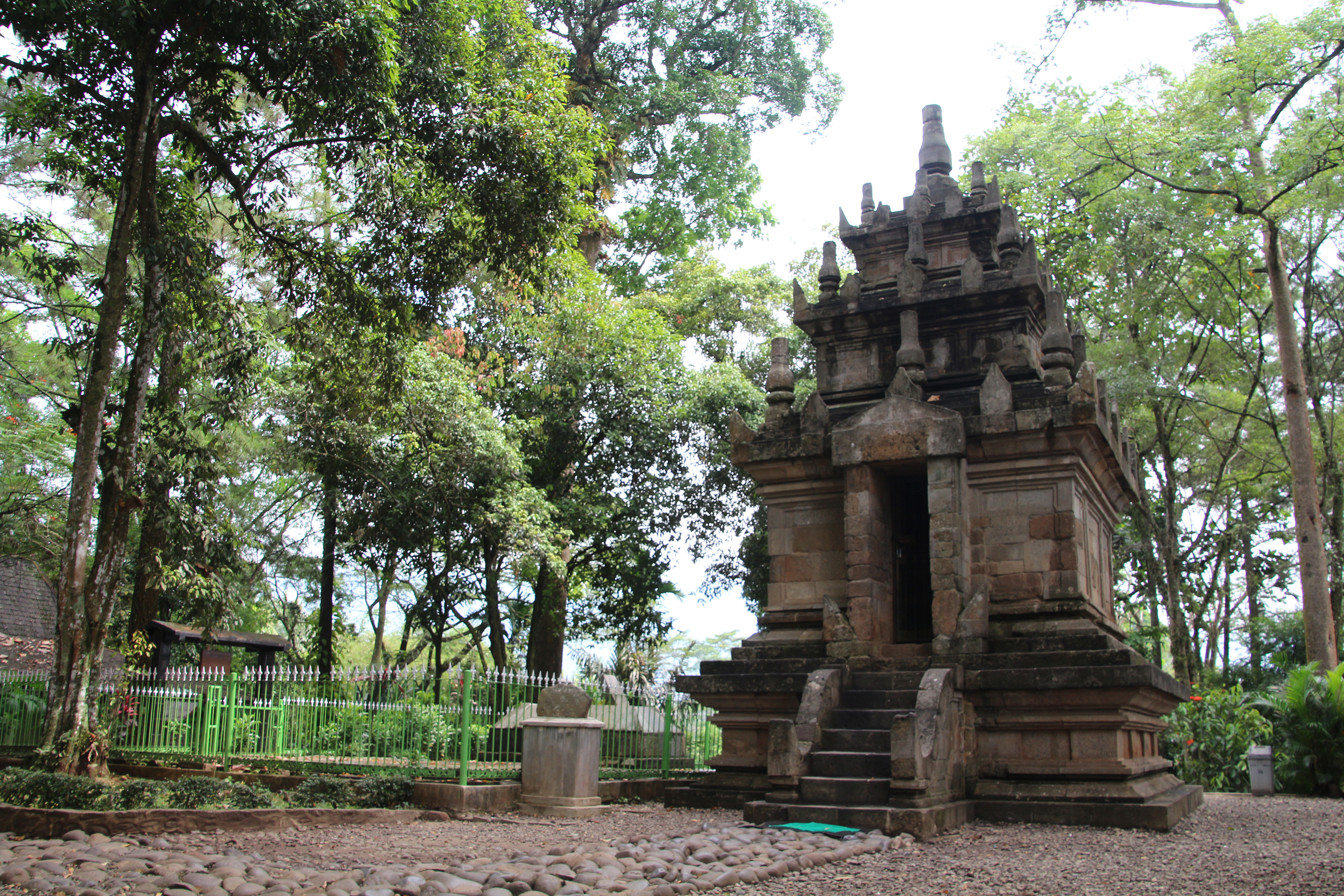
- Cangkuang Temple

- Coat of arms
- Nickname: Kabupaten Intan (Regency of Diamonds)
- Motto(s): Tata Tengtrem Kerta Raharja ᮒᮒ ᮒᮨᮀᮒᮢᮨᮙ᮪ ᮊᮨᮁᮒ ᮛᮠᮁᮏ (Orderly, peaceful, and prosperous)
- Location within West Java

- Location in Java and Indonesia Garut Regency (Indonesia)
- Coordinates: 7°12′10″S 107°53′09″E
- Country: Indonesia
- Province: West Java
- Regency seat: South Tarogong (Tarogong Kidul)

Government
  - Regent: Abdusy Syakur Amin
  - Vice Regent: Luthfianisa Putri Karlina

Area
  - Total: 3,065.19 km^{2} (1,183.48 sq mi)

Population (mid 2025 estimate)
  - Total: 2,748,699
  - Density: 896.747/km^{2} (2,322.56/sq mi)
- Time zone: UTC+7 (WIB)
- Area code: 0262
- Website: garutkab.go.id

Garut Regency (Indonesian: Kabupaten Garut, Indonesian pronunciation: [kabuˌpat̪ɛn ˈɡarʊt̪̚]; Sundanese: Kabupatén Garut) is a regency in the Indonesian province of West Java. It covers an area of 3,065.19 km^{2} (1,186.91 mi^{2}). Geographically, it lies between 6°57′34″ – 7°44′57″ South latitude and 107°24′34″ – 108°7′34″ East longitude. The population at the 2010 census was 2,404,121, and at the 2020 census was 2,585,607; the official estimate as at mid 2025 was 2,748,699 (comprising 1,404,181 males and 1,344,518 females). South Tarogong (Tarogong Kidul) is the regency seat, which is located within the urbanised area of Greater Garut, which covers the four districts of Tarogong Kidul, Tarogong Kaler, Garut Kota and Karangpawitan - with a combined area of almost 150 km^{2} and a population in mid 2025 of 507,867.

== Adjacent regencies ==
It is bordered by:

- Eastern side: Tasikmalaya Regency
- Western side: Cianjur Regency and Bandung Regency
- Northern side: Sumedang Regency
- Southern side: Indian Ocean

== Geography ==
In general, Garut has a cool but tropical climate, with an average temperature of 24 °C (76 °F). Average annual rainfall is 2,590 mm (102 inches). This area includes valley territory surrounded by volcanoes (Mount Karacak: 1,838 m, Mount Cikuray: 2,821 m, Mount Guntur: 2,249 m, Mount Papandayan: 2,622 m) on the northern side, with average heights of 700–750 m above sea level. Streams of solidified lava are present on their slopes.

== Administrative districts ==
Garut Regency is currently divided into 42 districts (kecamatan), listed below with their areas and populations at the 2010 and 2020 censuses, together with the official estimates as at mid 2025. The table also includes the locations of the district administrative centres, the number of villages in each district (totaling 421 rural desa and 21 urban kelurahan), and its post code.

However, in 2013 the National Legislative Council approved a proposal to create a new Regency - South Garut Regency (Kabupaten Garut Selatan) - to include the 16 southernmost districts (those listed first in the table below) of the existing Garut Regency, with a combined population of 708,750 in mid 2025. The new Regency would thus inherit 63% of the land area of the existing regency, but only 25.8% of its population in mid 2024. As at 2025, this proposal has not yet been implemented, but for convenience the table below has been split to distinguish those districts in the proposed South Garut Regency.

| Kode Wilayah | Name of District (kecamatan) | Area in km^{2} | Pop'n 2010 census | Pop'n 2020 census | Pop'n mid 2025 estimate | Admin centre | No. of Villages | Post code |
|---|---|---|---|---|---|---|---|---|
| 32.05.35 | Cisewu | 172.83 | 32,976 | 33,412 | 34,432 | Cisewu | 9 | 44169 |
| 32.05.36 | Caringin | 99.03 | 29,566 | 32,010 | 34,063 | Purbayani | 6 | 44166 |
| 32.05.37 | Talegong | 108.74 | 30,715 | 28,747 | 29,625 | Sukamulya | 7 | 44167 |
| 32.05.31 | Bungbulang | 146.98 | 59,659 | 58,300 | 60,798 | Bungbulang | 13 | 44165 |
| 32.05.32 | Mekarmukti | 55.22 | 15,634 | 18,161 | 19,995 | Cijayana | 5 | 44155 |
| 32.05.34 | Pamulihan | 132.44 | 17,570 | 18,592 | 19,566 | Pakenjeng | 5 | 44168 |
| 32.05.33 | Pakenjeng | 198.44 | 65,752 | 68,277 | 71,203 | Jatiwangi | 13 | 44164 |
| 32.05.30 | Cikelet | 172.32 | 40,928 | 44,488 | 47,432 | Cikelet | 11 | 44177 |
| 32.05.27 | Pameungpeuk | 44.11 | 38,852 | 42,560 | 45,547 | Mandalakasih | 8 | 44175 |
| 32.05.29 | Cibalong | 213.59 | 40,768 | 44,565 | 47,644 | Karya Mukti | 11 | 44176 |
| 32.05.28 | Cisompet | 172.25 | 49,848 | 52,746 | 55,510 | Cisompet | 11 | 44174 |
| 32.05.26 | Peundeuy | 56.79 | 22,408 | 23,755 | 25,022 | Peundeuy | 6 | 44178 |
| 32.05.24 | Singajaya | 67.69 | 45,509 | 47,313 | 49,369 | Singajaya | 9 | 44170 |
| 32.05.25 | Cihurip | 40.42 | 17,993 | 18,691 | 19,548 | Cihurip | 4 | 44173 |
| 32.05.22 | Cikajang | 124.95 | 78,164 | 83,944 | 88,978 | Cikajang | 12 | 44171 |
| 32.05.23 | Banjarwangi | 123.82 | 56,100 | 57,780 | 60,018 | Banjarwangi | 11 | 44172 |
| | Totals; South Garut | 1,929.62 | 642,442 | 673,341 | 708,750 | | 141 | |

| Kode Wilayah | Name of District (kecamatan) | Area in km^{2} | Pop'n 2010 census | Pop'n 2020 census | Pop'n mid 2025 estimate | Admin centre | No. of Villages | Post code |
|---|---|---|---|---|---|---|---|---|
| 32.05.19 | Cilawu | 77.63 | 100,073 | 107,738 | 114,335 | Cilawu | 18 | 44181 |
| 32.05.17 | Bayongbong | 49.95 | 93,102 | 102,703 | 110,284 | Bayongbong | 18 | 44162 |
| 32.05.18 | Cigedug | 31.20 | 38,199 | 43,475 | 47,395 | Cigedug | 5 | 44116 |
| 32.05.20 | Cisurupan | 80.88 | 95,086 | 98,587 | 102,736 | Balewangi | 17 | 44163 |
| 32.05.21 | Sukaresmi | 35.17 | 37,082 | 39,844 | 42,244 | Sukaresmi | 7 | 44154 |
| 32.05.07 | Samarang | 59.71 | 71,169 | 77,181 | 82,197 | Samarang | 13 | 44160 |
| 32.05.08 | Pasirwangi | 46.70 | 62,048 | 64,935 | 67,975 | Pasirwangi | 12 | 44161 |
| 32.05.05 | Tarogong Kidul | 19.46 | 108,192 | 114,965 | 121,235 | Sukakarya | 12 ^{(a)} | 44150 |
| 32.05.04 | Tarogong Kaler | 50.57 | 84,843 | 95,942 | 104,267 | Cimanganten | 13 ^{(b)} | 44151 |
| 32.05.01 | Garut Kota | 27.71 | 126,452 | 127,583 | 132,782 | Pakuwon | 11 ^{(c)} | 44111: 44119 |
| 32.05.02 | Karangpawitan | 52.07 | 116,833 | 135,814 | 149,583 | Sindanglaya | 20 ^{(d)} | 44182 |
| 32.05.03 | Wanaraja | 35.26 | 44,036 | 48,281 | 51,691 | Wanaraja | 9 | 44180 |
| 32.05.42 | Sucinaraja | 33.83 | 26,045 | 29,105 | 31,450 | Tegalpanjang | 7 | 44115 |
| 32.05.41 | Pangatikan | 19.72 | 38,472 | 42,043 | 44,942 | Cimaragas | 8 | 44183 |
| 32.05.15 | Sukawening | 38.83 | 49,689 | 55,890 | 60,583 | Sukamukti | 11 | 44179 |
| 32.05.16 | Karangtengah | 23.28 | 16,107 | 18,371 | 20,048 | Sindanggalih | 4 | 44184 |
| 32.05.06 | Banyuresmi | 47.88 | 78,190 | 91,016 | 96,784 | Bagendit | 15 | 44191 |
| 32.05.09 | Leles | 73.51 | 76,056 | 83,445 | 89,369 | Leles | 12 | 44152 ^{(e)} |
| 32.05.11 | Leuwigoong | 19.35 | 41,485 | 46,398 | 50,156 | Leuwigoong | 8 | 44192 |
| 32.05.12 | Cibatu | 41.43 | 63,598 | 73,646 | 78,494 | Cibatu | 11 | 44185 |
| 32.05.13 | Kersamanah | 16.50 | 35,583 | 38,612 | 41,133 | Kersamanah | 6 | 44189 |
| 32.05.40 | Cibiuk | 19.90 | 30,368 | 34,560 | 37,675 | Cipareuan | 5 | 44193 |
| 32.05.10 | Kadungora | 37.31 | 86,516 | 92,233 | 97,423 | Karangtengah | 14 | 44153 |
| 32.05.38 | Balubur; Limbangan | 73.59 | 76,530 | 78,608 | 81,545 | Limbangantimur | 14 | 44186 |
| 32.05.39 | Selaawi | 34.07 | 37,167 | 41,703 | 45,151 | Selaawi | 7 | 44187 |
| 32.05.14 | Malangbong | 92.38 | 118,671 | 129,588 | 138,472 | Malangbong | 24 | 44188 |
| | Totals; North Garut | 1,135.55 | 1,761,679 | 1,912,266 | 2,039,949 | | 301 | |
| | Totals; Garut Regency | 3,065.19 | 2,404,121 | 2,585,607 | 2,748,699 | | 442 | |

Note: (a) comprising 5 urban kelurahan (Jayawaras, Pataruman, Sukagalih, Sukajaya and Sukakarya) and 7 rural desa. (b) including one kelurahan (Pananjung).
(c) comprising all 11 kelurahan (Cimuncang, Ciwalen, Kota Kulon, Kota Wetan, Margawati, Muara Sanding, Pakuwon, Paminggir, Regol, Sukamantri and Sukanegla).
(d) comprising 4 kelurahan (Karangmulya, Lebakjaya, Lengkongjaya and Sucikaler) and 16 desa. (e) except the desa of Cangkuang, which has a post code of 44119.

Administratively, the 42 districts are subdivided into 442 villages, comprising 421 rural desa and 21 urban kelurahan. Cibalong District is the largest district and covers 6.97% of the area of all Garut Regency districts, while the Kersamanah District is the smallest, with an area of 1,650 ha or 0.54%. Garut constitutes the buffer land and hinterland for the development of Bandung Raja's territory. It has a strategic position and acts as the supplier for the needs of Bandung Municipality and Bandung Regency's populations.

The Garut Regency has two distinct topographical areas:

- Northern Garut consists of highlands and mountainous terrain, which have the largest rice fields of Garut
- Southern Garut is mostly made out of downward sloping lands, along with twelve main rivers which flow south into the Java Trench, an area of oceanic crust near the southern coast of Java that is part of the larger Indian Ocean.

Tourist resorts are well-established in Garut Regency, with coastal views, and others with craters, waterfalls, lakes and a hot springs.

== History ==
Coat of Arms of Garut Regency (then spelt "Garoet" in Dutch) used during Dutch colonial era, adopted from 1920s.

On March 2, 1811, the Balubur Limbangan Regency was defeated by Governor General Herman W. Daendels (of the Dutch Colonial Army), and Regent Tumenggung Wangsakusumah II resigned. Balubur Limbangan Regency at that date comprised 6 districts: Balubur, Malangbong, Wanaraja, Wanakerta, Cibeureum and Papandak.

On 16 February 1813, a new Limbangan Regency was founded by Lt. Governor Sir Stamford Raffles, the regency which subsequently became Garut Regency. R.A.A. Adiwijaya was the first Regent of Garut Regency. He governed from 1813 until 1821. He was well known for his call of Dalem Cipeujeuh.

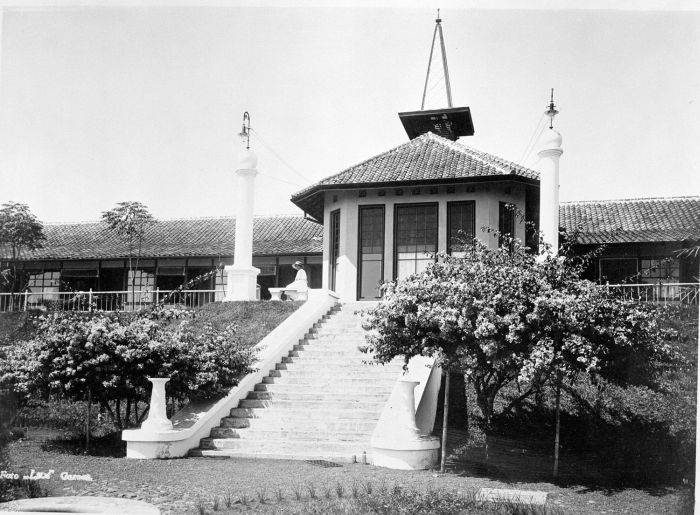
Garut sanatorium in the 1920s

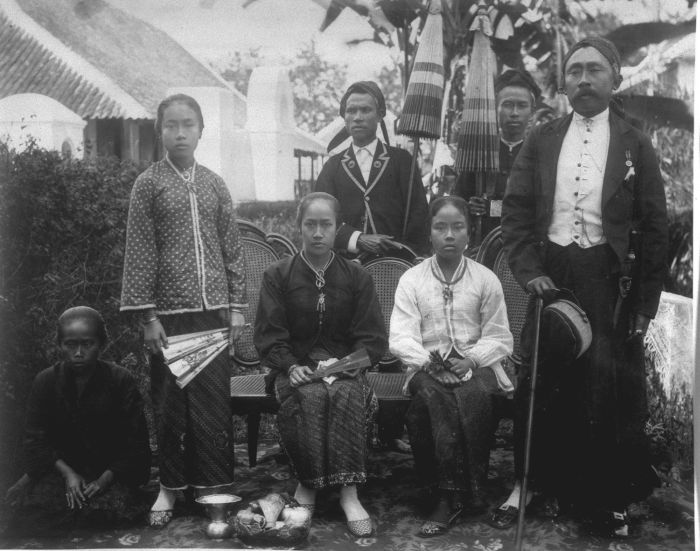
The Regent of Garut Raden Adipati Aria Wiratanudatar VII with his wife, RA Lasminingrat, and family.

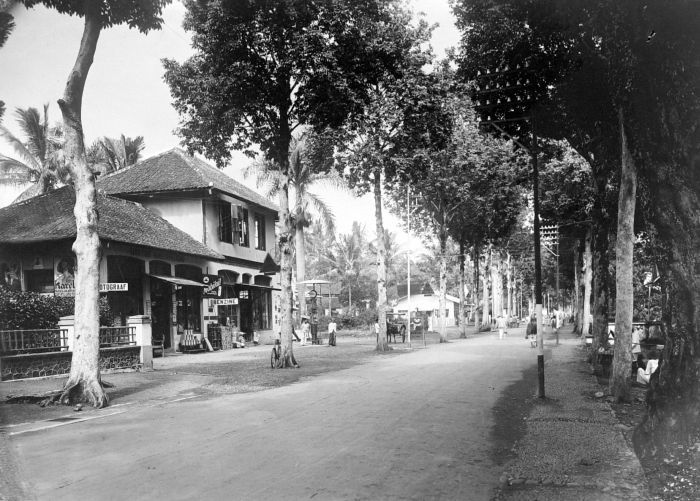
Garut's main street in 1936

== Localities ==
- Garsela
- Sindangratu

== Local produce ==
Land fertility varies greatly because of influence by mountains, rivers and coastal lowlands. As a result, agricultural businesses are primarily plantation-based, as well as subsistence farming and animal husbandry, followed by forest resources.

Some known products from Garut are:

- Garut Orange fruits (Jeruk Garut)
- Mangdogars Handycraft "Mang Dogar" as Garut Icon likes ornament, dolls, souvenir, clothes
- Garut Lamb (Domba Garut)
- Dodol Garut (a snack)
- Vetiver Root Oil (Andropogon zizanioides)
- Batik Tulis Garutan (hand painted clothes)
- Silk clothes
- Gemstones
- Leather crafts
- Bamboo crafts

== Tourism in Garut ==
Garut is known as Zwitserse van Java (Switzerland of Java). It has so many tourist attractions divided into several tourism zone units (Indonesian: Satuan Kawasan Wisata (SKW)):

- Cangkuang TZU including Paragliding Mount Haruman, Cikembulan Zoo, Cimandi Racun Waterfall, Cangkuang Lake, Cangkuang, Jafar Umar Sidiq Tomb,
- Cipanas TZU including Bagendit Lake, Citiis Waterfall, Mount Guntur, Cipanas Water Park
- Darajat Crater TZU including Darajat Crater and water parks around.
- Mbah Godog Tomb TZU including Godog Tomb, Linggaratu Tomb, Cinunuk Tomb, Talaga Bodas,
- Ngamplang TZU including Cihanyawar Waterfall, Flamboyan Golf Course, Dayeuh Manggung Tea Plantation,
- Pameungpeuk TZU including Darmaga Beach, Manulusu Beach, Gunung Geder, Santolo Beach, Neglasari Beach, Sayang Heulang Beach
- Papandayan TZU including Cimmanuk River Rafting, Ciburuy Site, Curug Orok, Papandayan Crater,
- Rancabuaya TZU including Rancabuaya Beach, Cikandang River Rafting, Sanghiyang Taraje Waterfall,
- Sancang TZU including Sancang Forest, Cijeruk Indah Beach and Karang Paranje Beach

== Bibliography ==
- Witton, Patrick (2003). Indonesia (7th ed.). Melbourne: Lonely Planet. p. 191. ISBN 1-74059-154-2.
