= Indonesian Marhaen People's Union =

Indonesian Marhaen People's Union Persatuan Rakyat Marhaen Indonesia
- Leader: Mei Kartawinata
- Founders: Mei Kartawinata, M. Rasyid, Sumitra
- Founded: 17 December 1945
- Ideology: Marhaenism; Pancasila; Nationalism; Anti-Islamism
- Political position: Left-wing
- Colours: Red

The Indonesian Marhaen People's Union (Indonesian: Persatuan Rakyat Marhaen Indonesia), generally known by its acronym Permai (meaning 'beautiful'), was a social movement in Indonesia, functioning both as a political party and an Abangan mystical association. (Note: Mei Kartawinata's closeness to the Marhaenism movement and its founder Sukarno is thought to have made Marhaenism a political ideology that resonated with the national perspective and spiritual practice of mystical associations that Mei had built since the Dutch East Indies era, see: Aliran Perjalanan, Spiritualitas Kebangsaan dari Tatar Sunda) The organisation was founded on 17 December 1945. Permai was led and founded by Mei Kartawinata (Note: Born 1 May 1897 in Bandung, Kebonjati Street, Pasar Kota Village, Bandung. Her father was Raden Kartowidjojo (Rembang, who was descended from the Brawijaya-Majapahit lineage) and her mother was Nyai Raden Mariah (Bogor, who was descended from Prince Sake, Bogor, and Prince Sugeri, Jatinegara, from the Siliwangi-Pajajaran lineage). Mei spent her old age in Sukasirna - Cicadas, Bandung, and died on 11 February 1967 buried in Karangpawitan, Pakutandang Village Ciparay, Bandung Regency. See: About Mei Kartawinata, by Budi Daya Organisation (Tuesday, 13 January 2015). Accessed 7 August 2015.) in Cimerta, Pasirkareumbi, Subang, Subang Regency with two friends, M. Rasyid and Sumitra. At its peak on 17 December 1945, It was declared as a political party with J.B. Assa, Iwa Kusumasumantri, Izaak Riwoe Lobo, and S. Karsono Werdojo.

Permai called its doctrine Marhaenism. It beliefs were said to have been revealed to the Permai founder during meditation. The movement claimed to practice 'pure native science', i.e. pre-Hindu and pre-Islamic 'original' Javanese beliefs. This set of ideas was combined with support for Indonesian Pancasila nationalism. Permai was strongly opposed to Islam, arguing that it was a foreign religion, in contradiction to Javanese culture and traditions. On the other hand, whilst officially rejecting Hinduism, the movement had incorporated many Hindu practices into its doctrine.

In February 1948 the Tan Malaka-led Revolutionary People's Movement was founded, with Permai as one of its constituents.

The outspoken anti-Islamic profile of Permai brought it into collision with Islamist political forces. In 1954 mass protests were launched against statements made by the Permai leader Mei Kartawinata. According to some accounts, these protests mustered half a million participants. Also, the holding of Permai weddings and funerals provoked clashes with Muslim organizations (Permai was not a recognized religion, and thus these ceremonies had no official stature).

Permai obtained 149,287 votes in the 1955 legislative election (0.4% of the national vote), and won a seat in the parliament. After the election, the Permai MP joined the National Progressive Fraction, a body of ten MPs from Java. In the 1955 Constituent Assembly election, the party obtained 164,386 votes (0.43%) and two seats in the assembly.
