= 2024 Bandung regency election =

Local election in Indonesia

- 27 November 2024
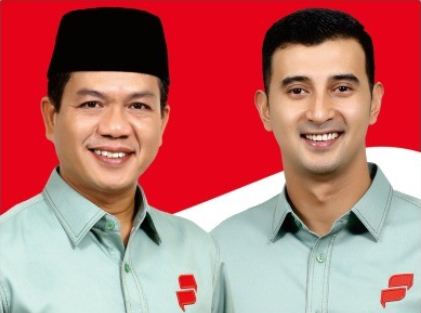

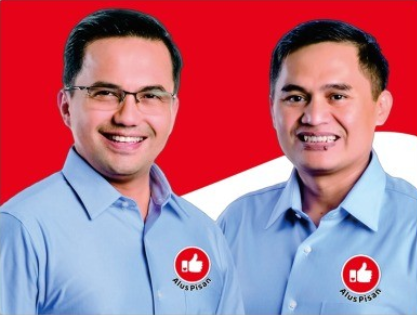
Candidate	Dadang Supriatna	Sahrul Gunawan
Party	PKB	Golkar
Running mate	Ali Syakieb	Gun Gun Gunawan
Popular vote	1,046,344	827,240
Percentage	55.85%	44.15%
Regent before election
Dadang Supriatna
PKB
Elected Regent
Dadang Supriatna
PKB

The 2024 Bandung regency election was held on 27 November 2024 as part of nationwide local elections to elect the regent of Bandung Regency for a five-year term. The previous election was held in 2020. Incumbent regent Dadang Supriatna managed to secure a second term, winning 55.85% of votes after defeating his previous deputy.

== Electoral system ==
The election, like other local elections in 2024, follow the first-past-the-post system where the candidate with the most votes wins the election, even if they do not win a majority. It is possible for a candidate to run uncontested, in which case the candidate is still required to win a majority of votes "against" an "empty box" option. Should the candidate fail to do so, the election will be repeated on a later date.

== Candidates ==
According to electoral regulations, in order to qualify for the election, candidates are required to secure support from a political party or a coalition of parties controlling 11 seats in the Bandung Regency Regional House of Representatives (DPRD). With 12 seats, the National Awakening Party is the only party which would be eligible to nominate a candidate without forming a coalition with other parties. Candidates may alternatively demonstrate support in form of photocopies of identity cards, which in Bandung's case corresponds to 172,589 copies. Only one such candidate registered, but failed to submit enough proofs of support by the given deadline.

=== Potential ===
The following are individuals who have either been publicly mentioned as a potential candidate by a political party in the DPRD, publicly declared their candidacy with press coverage, or considered as a potential candidate by media outlets:

- Dadang Supriatna (PKB), incumbent regent.
- Sahrul Gunawan (Golkar), incumbent vice regent.

== Political map ==
Following the 2024 Indonesian legislative election, eight political parties are represented in the Bandung DPRD:

Political parties	Seat count
National Awakening Party (PKB)	12 / 55
Great Indonesia Movement Party (Gerindra)	9 / 55
Prosperous Justice Party (PKS)	7 / 55
Democratic Party (Demokrat)	7 / 55
Party of Functional Groups (Golkar)	6 / 55
NasDem Party	6 / 55
Indonesian Democratic Party of Struggle (PDI-P)	4 / 55
National Mandate Party (PAN)	4 / 55
