= Wayang Windu Geothermal Power Station =

- Country: Indonesia
- Location: Pangalengan, West Java
- Coordinates: 07°12′00″S 107°37′30″E
- Status: Operational
- Commission date: 1999
- Construction cost: >US$200 million
- Owner: Magma Nusantara Limited

Geothermal power station
- Type: Flash steam
- Min. source temp.: >300 °C (572 °F)

Power generation
- Units operational: 1 × 110 MW; 1 × 117 MW
- Nameplate capacity: 227 MW; 354 MW (Planned)

The Wayang Windu Geothermal Power Station is the largest geothermal power station in Indonesia. The facility utilizes two units, one with 110 MW and the other with 117 MW, with a total installed capacity of 227 MW. The power station is located near the town of Pangalengan, 40 km south of Bandung, West Java. An estimated cost of US$200 million was incurred in construction and development. A third unit of 127 MW is being planned and expected to be onstream by mid-2013.

The arrangements to establish and operate the Wayang Windu plant were part of the overall policy towards the development of geothermal energy in Indonesia

== Geothermal field ==
The area of the Wayang Windu geothermal field is in the order of 40 km^{2} (15 sq mi). This reservoir is liquid-dominated, overlaid by three separate vapour-dominated reservoirs.

== See also ==
- Geothermal power in Indonesia
- Wayang-Windu
- List of geothermal power stations
- List of largest power stations in the world
