= Asep Sunandar Sunarya =

Sundanese rod puppet master

Asep Sunandar Sunarya (3 September 1955 – 31 March 2014) was a Sundanese wayang golek dalang (Sundanese rod puppet master). He was one of the most famous puppeteers in the genre.

Sunarya was born in Kampung Jelekong, Baleendah, Bandung, where he died on 31 March 2014 at 14:20 WIB (UTC+7) of a heart attack. He was 58 years old.

== Personal Achievement ==
- 1984–2001 : Founder board of Yayasan Pedalangan Giri Harja.
- 1975 – present : Not less than 120 wayang golek shows held annually, even between 1976 and 1987 performed wayang golek show uninterruptedly for six consecutive months.
- 1978 : Champion Pinilih 1 Binojakrama in West Java Province.
- 1982 : Champion Pinilih 1 Binojakrama in West Java Province.
- 1985 : Champion General Binojakrama in West Java Province.
- 1989 : A wayang golek tour to United States of America.
- 1992 : Attending Puppet Festivity (Teater Boneka) in France.
- 1993 : Honorable Lecturer at Institut International de la Marionnette in Charleville-Mézières.
- 1994 : A wayang golek tour in Europe.
- 1994-2004 : hosted "ASEP Show" di Televisi Pendidikan Indonesia (TPI), with its main character Cepot every Ramadhan or fasting month in Moslem calendar.
- 2001 : A tour of England for wayang golek play in 12 city with Asian Music Circuit (AMC).
- 2005 : performed wayang golek shows every Saturday night in Televisi Pendidikan Indonesia (TPI). The shows were aired for 39 episodes.
- 2006 : Wayang Golek Festivity on promoting West Java Provinces government agenda along with RRI birthday.
- 2006 : with American Music Circuit (AMC) having wayang golek show and workshop wayang golek in England for 40 days.

Giri Harja 3, wayang golek support group owned and founded by Asep Sunandar Sunarya himself, also received various awards from many institutions, yet the most prestigious of all was presidential medal for cultural affair Satyalencana Kebudayaan conveyed by Presiden Soeharto.

== Tribute ==
On 3 September 2016, Google Doodle commemorated his 61st birthday.
