= Cikondang =

Village in West Java, Indonesia

Cikondang is a traditional Indonesian village located within the village of Lamajang in the Pangalengan District in West Java in Indonesia.

== Description ==
Cikondang is a traditional Indonesian village located within the village of Lamajang in the Pangalengan District in West Java in Indonesia. The village borders Cikalong and Cipinang to the north, Pulosari to the south, Tribakti Mulya to the east, and Sukamuju to the west. It is 38 kilometres (24 mi) from Bandung.

== History ==
In 2020, it is one of the places in Indonesia heavily affected by COVID-19. Its leaders coordinated with its national government to facilitate the aid as it turns out that from the original proposal of 1400 families, only 200 families received help.

== Etymology ==
The name Cikondang derives from the Kondang fountain around which the village grew.
