= Fifie Rahardja =

Indonesian environmentalist

Fifie Rahardja is an Indonesian environmental activist and businessperson. She is notable for her founding of an activist organization and for her efforts to clean the Citarum River in West Java.

== Biography ==
Rahardja was born into a large farming family in Pangalengan. She became involved in environmental activism in 2008, when her husband (a property developer) acquired land in Baleendah, Bandung, where chronic pollution had greatly reduced the value of properties. The land was heavily polluted with trash, prompting her to research uses for the refuse. Once the trash was cleared, the Rahardja family developed housing in the previously undesirable area, with the experience inspiring Fifie to continue her activism.

In the 2010s, Rahardja founded the Bersinar Waste Bank (translatable as the Shining Garbage Bank or the Bank Sampah Bersinar), which worked to invest in the community by removing garbage. The bank remained in operation as of July 2020. The main focus of the bank is to remove and recycle piles of garbage on the banks of the heavily-polluted Citarum river, which carries trash into residential areas during floods. In 2014 she launched a series of educations campaigns in local communities and universities to encourage people to recycle, not burn their trash, and not throw their garbage into the river. She also launched a campaign in which the bank would allow people to exchange trash for essential goods like books, rice, and oil. The bank also stimulates the local economy by buying goods from locals and exchanging these goods for trash turned in by other people, effectively treating collected garbage as a form of currency. The bank also provides educational workshops to teach people about trash and train people to re-purpose trash into marketable goods. According to Rahardja, as of 2018 around 7,000 people were using the bank's services. She also continues to lobby the local government for support, as she has calculated that more waste is discarded into the Citarum river than is taken out.
