= Majalaya =

Coordinates: 6°59′58″S 107°37′17″E

- Interactive map of Majalaya
- Country: Indonesia
- Province: West Java
- Regency: Bandung

Area
  - Total: 24.14 km^{2} (9.32 sq mi)

Population
  - Total: 171,781
  - Density: 7,116/km^{2} (18,430/sq mi)
- Time zone: UTC+7 (IWST)

Majalaya is an administrative district (Kecamatan) in the Bandung Regency, in the West Java Province of Indonesia. The district is a plain area with an altitude between 500 m to 1,800 m above sea level. It is located southeast of the major West Java city of Bandung. Although outside of the city itself, the district is highly urbanised, with a population of 171,781 people in 2025, and an average density of 7,116 per km^{2}.

== Administrative divisions ==
Majalaya District is divided into the following eleven administrative villages - all classed as nominally rural desa, and sharing the postcode 40382.

| Kode wilayah | Village | Area in km^{2} | Population estimate 2025 |
|---|---|---|---|
| 32.04.33.2001 | Majalaya (village) | 0.95 | 11,642 |
| 32.04.33.2002 | Wangisagara | 2.13 | 16,192 |
| 32.04.33.2003 | Biru | 4.45 | 19,200 |
| 32.04.33.2004 | Padamulya | 1.85 | 15,788 |
| 32.04.33.2005 | Bojong | 1.61 | 16,501 |
| 32.04.33.2006 | Majasetra | 1.69 | 10,736 |
| 32.04.33.2007 | Majakerta | 1.16 | 12,766 |
| 32.04.33.2008 | Sukamaju | 2.73 | 20,691 |
| 32.04.33.2009 | Padaulun | 4.33 | 22,070 |
| 32.04.33.2010 | Neglasari | 1.94 | 11,856 |
| 32.04.33.2011 | Sukamukti | 1.30 | 14,339 |
| Totals | | 24.14 | 171,781 |
