= Wayang golek =

Indonesian puppet theatre

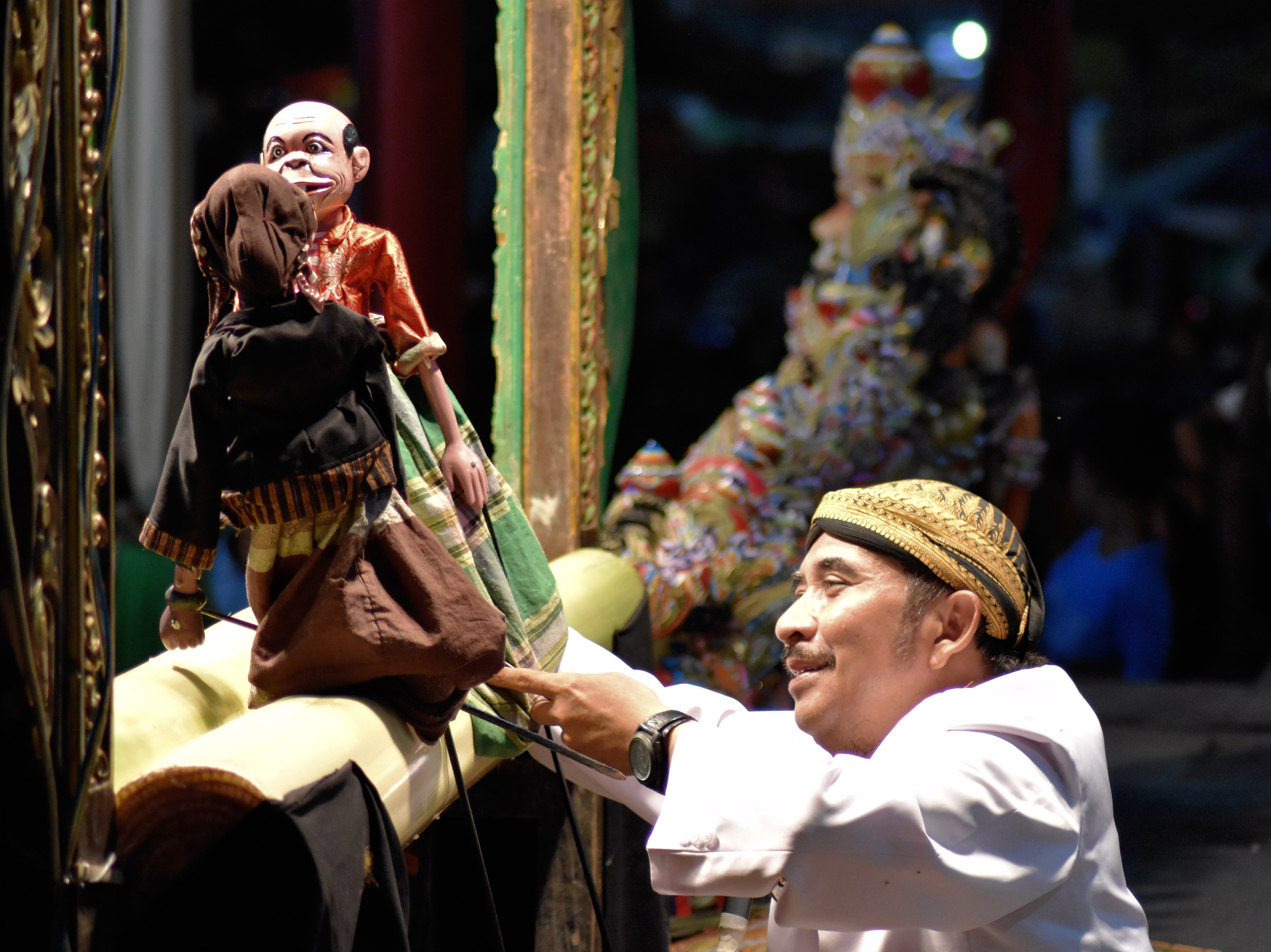
- Wayang golek performance with dalang
- Types: Traditional puppet theatre
- Ancestor arts: Sundanese people
- Originating culture: Indonesia

Wayang puppet theatre
- UNESCO Intangible Cultural Heritage
- Country: Indonesia
- Reference: 00063
- Region: Asia and the Pacific

Inscription history
- Inscription: 2008 (3rd session)
- List: Representative

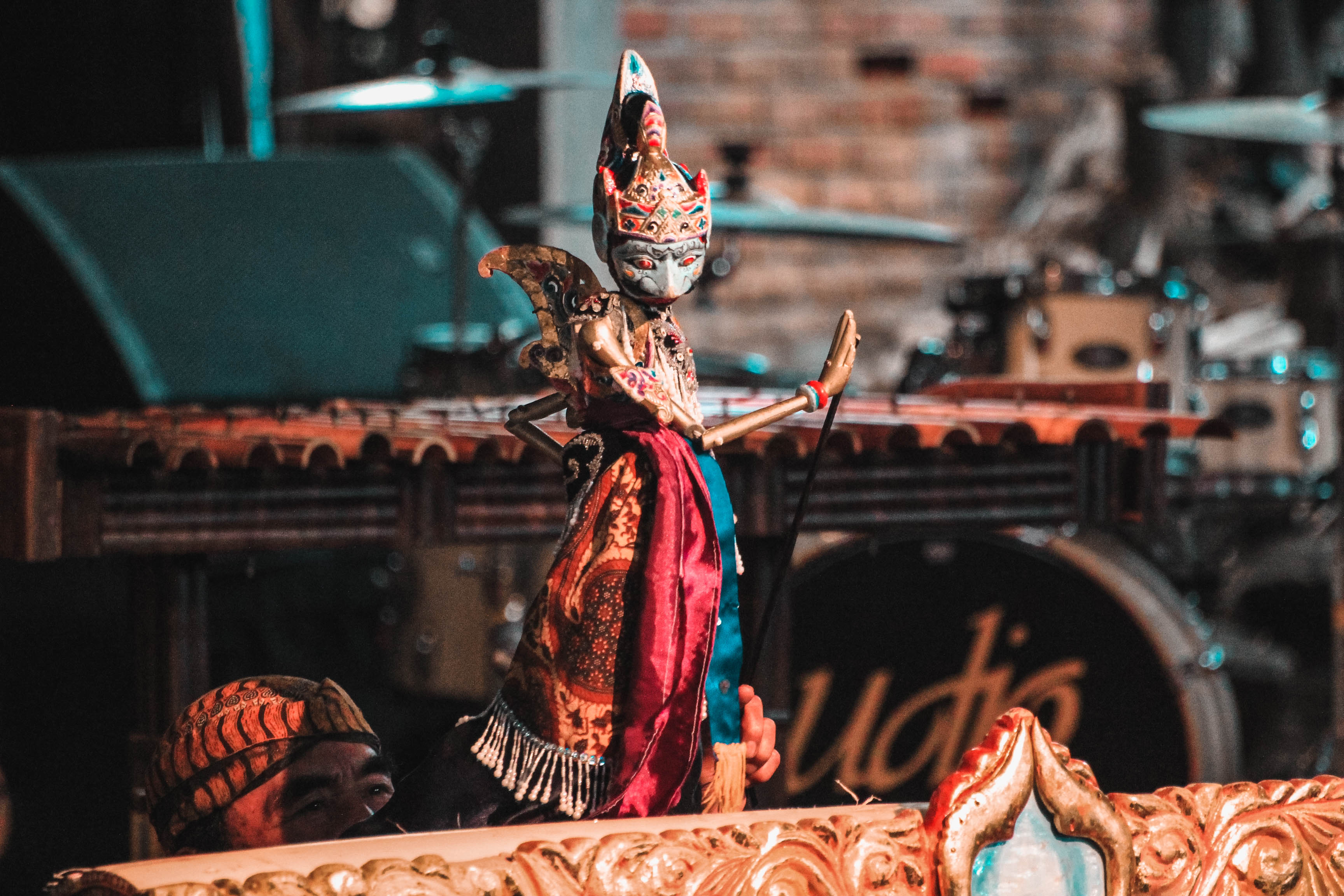
A dalang (puppeteer) playing Ghatotkacha character on the stage

Wayang golek (Sundanese: ᮝᮚᮀ ᮍᮧᮜᮦᮊ᮪, romanized: wayang golèk (in the lemes register); is one of the traditional Sundanese puppet arts from West Java, Indonesia. In contrast to the wayang art in other areas of Java that use leather in the production of wayang, wayang golek is a wayang art made of wood. Wayang golek is very popular in West Java, especially in the Pasundan land area. Today, wayang golek has become an important part of Sundanese culture.

On November 7, 2003, UNESCO designated wayang the flat leather shadow puppet (wayang kulit), the flat wooden puppet (wayang klitik), and the three-dimensional wooden puppet (wayang golek) theatre, as a Masterpiece of the Oral and Intangible Heritage of Humanity. In return for the acknowledgment, UNESCO required Indonesians to preserve the tradition.

== Etymology ==
The term wayang golèk is the Sundanese word in the lemes register, consisting of two words wayang (ꦮꦪꦁ) and golèk (ᮍᮧᮜᮦᮊ᮪). Wayang for "shadow" or "imagination" and golèk for "find wood". The words equivalent in Indonesian are bayang and kayu golek. In modern daily Sundanese and Indonesian vocabulary, wayang can refer to the puppet itself or the whole puppet theatre performance.

== History ==
The history of the wayang golek began in the 17th century. Initially, the wayang golek art emerged and was born on the north coast of the island of Java, especially in Cirebon, the wayang used is the wayang cepak in the form of a papak or flat head. According to legend, Sunan Suci used this wayang cepak to spread Islam in the community. At that time, the wayang cepak performance still used Cirebonese in its dialogue. The wayang golek art began to develop in West Java during the expansion of the Mataram sultanate.

Wayang golek began to develop with Sundanese as a dialogue. In addition to being a medium for spreading religion, wayang golek serves to complement Thanksgiving or ruwatan events. At that time the puppet show was still without using sindhen as an accompanist. Wayang golek began using the accompaniment of sinden in the 1920s. Until now the wayang golek continues to develop as entertainment for the community, especially in Sundanese land.

In this wayang golek show, as with other wayang shows, plays and stories are played by a puppeteer. The difference is the language in the dialogue that is brought is Sundanese. The standard and the wayang golek are also the same as wayang kulit, for example in the Ramayana and Mahabharata stories. But the difference is in the character of the clown, the naming and form of the clown have their version, namely the Sundanese version.

In addition to the Ramayana and Mahabharata stories, there are also stories and carangan stories. In this wayangan story, the mastermind makes his story line which is usually taken from folklore or daily life. in the story carangan usually contains moral messages, criticism, humor and others. In the story, carangan is not only used to develop the story but also to measure the quality of the mastermind in making the story. In this puppet show besides being accompanied by sinden also accompanied by Sundanese gamelan such as saron, peking, celery, bonang, kenong, gong, rebab, kempul xylophone, drums, and culant drums.

In its development, wayang golek remains one of the traditional arts of the pride of the people of West Java. Proven wayang golek still colors various events such as ruwatan, thanksgiving, and other large events. In addition, some artists continue to develop it with several additional creations to make it look attractive and stay sustainable without eliminating the grip on it.

== Gallery ==
Some Sundanese wayang golek figures

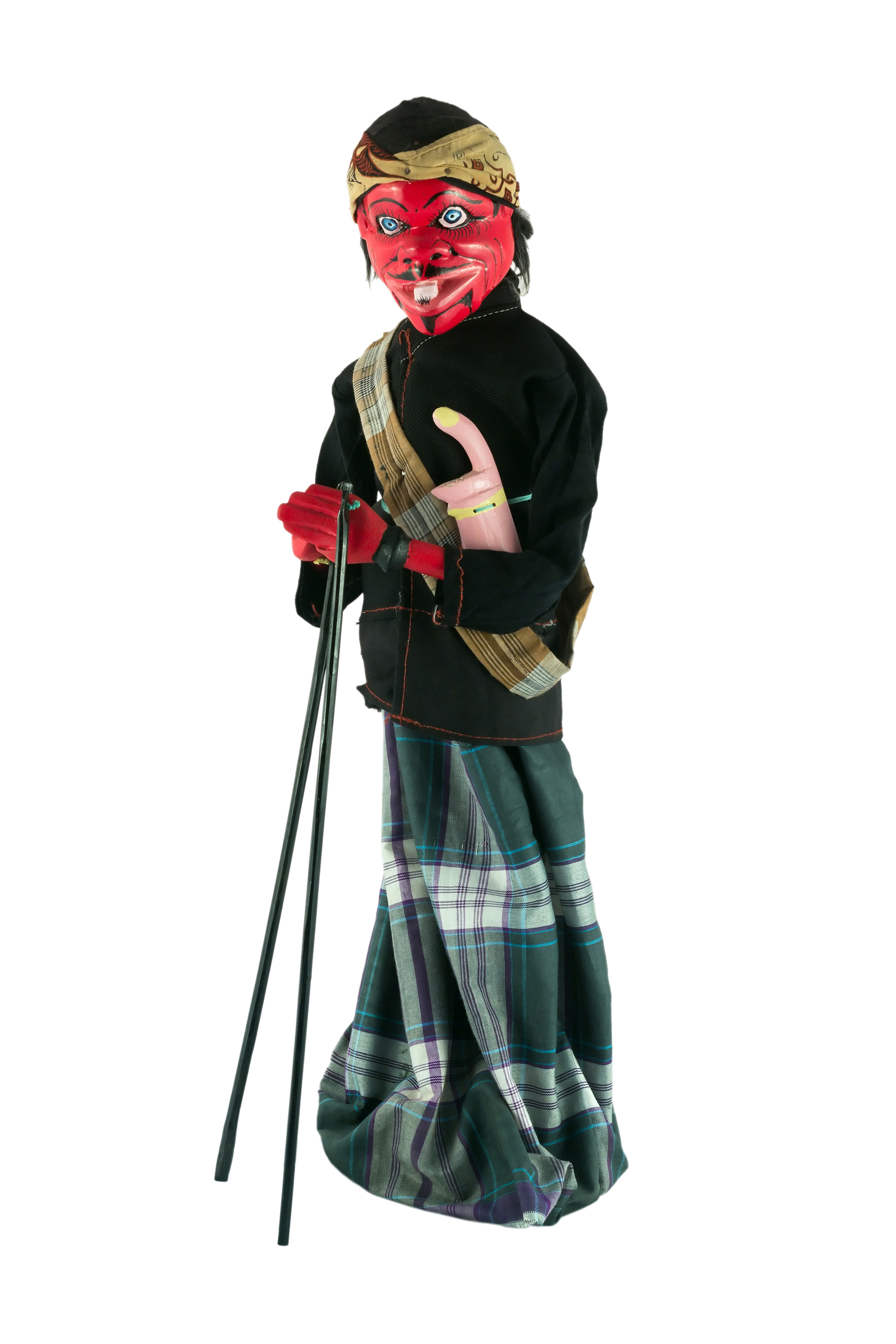
Wayang golek figure, Cepot, a Sundanese Punokawan, Indonesia

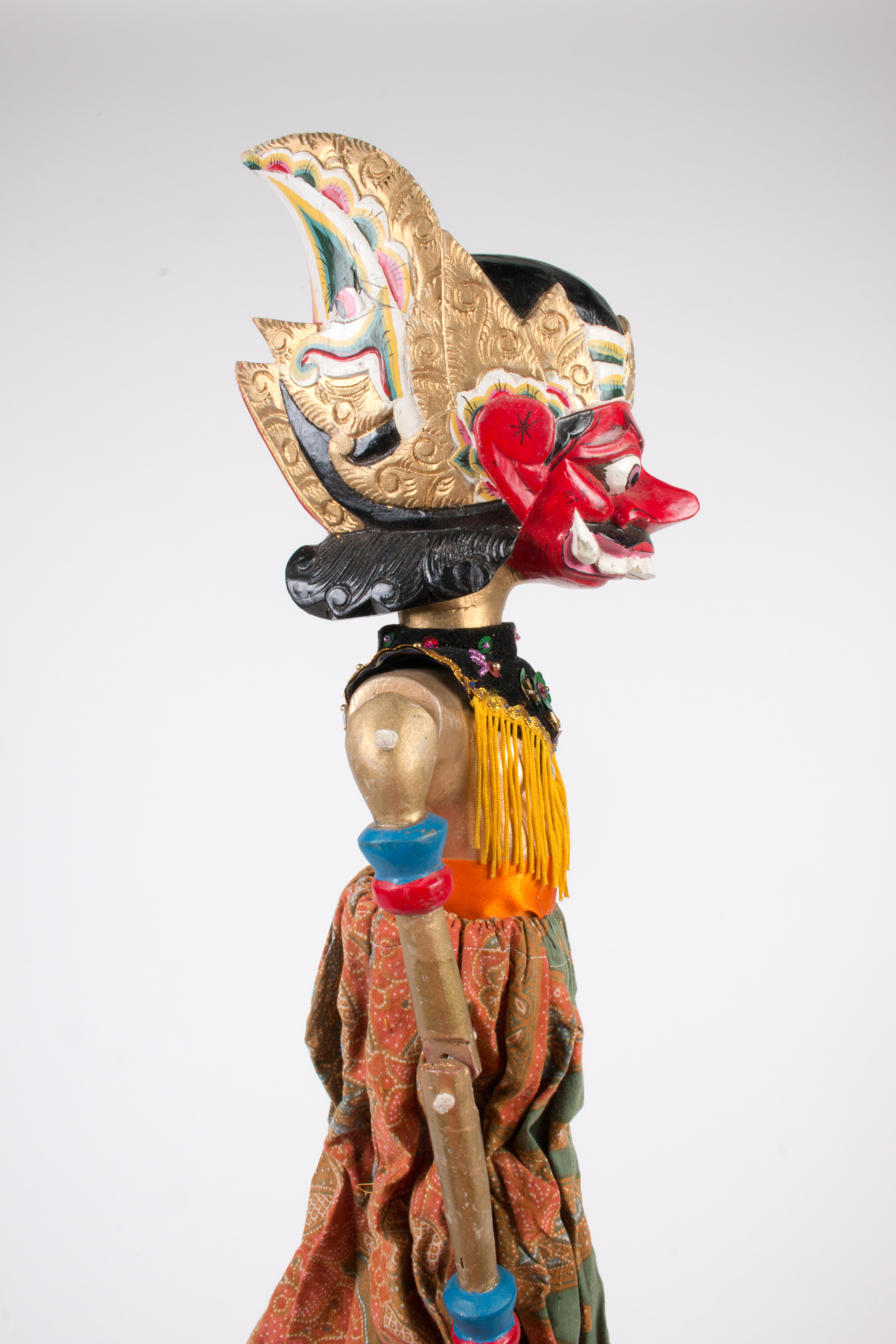
Wayang golek, Rahwana, Indonesia, 2004

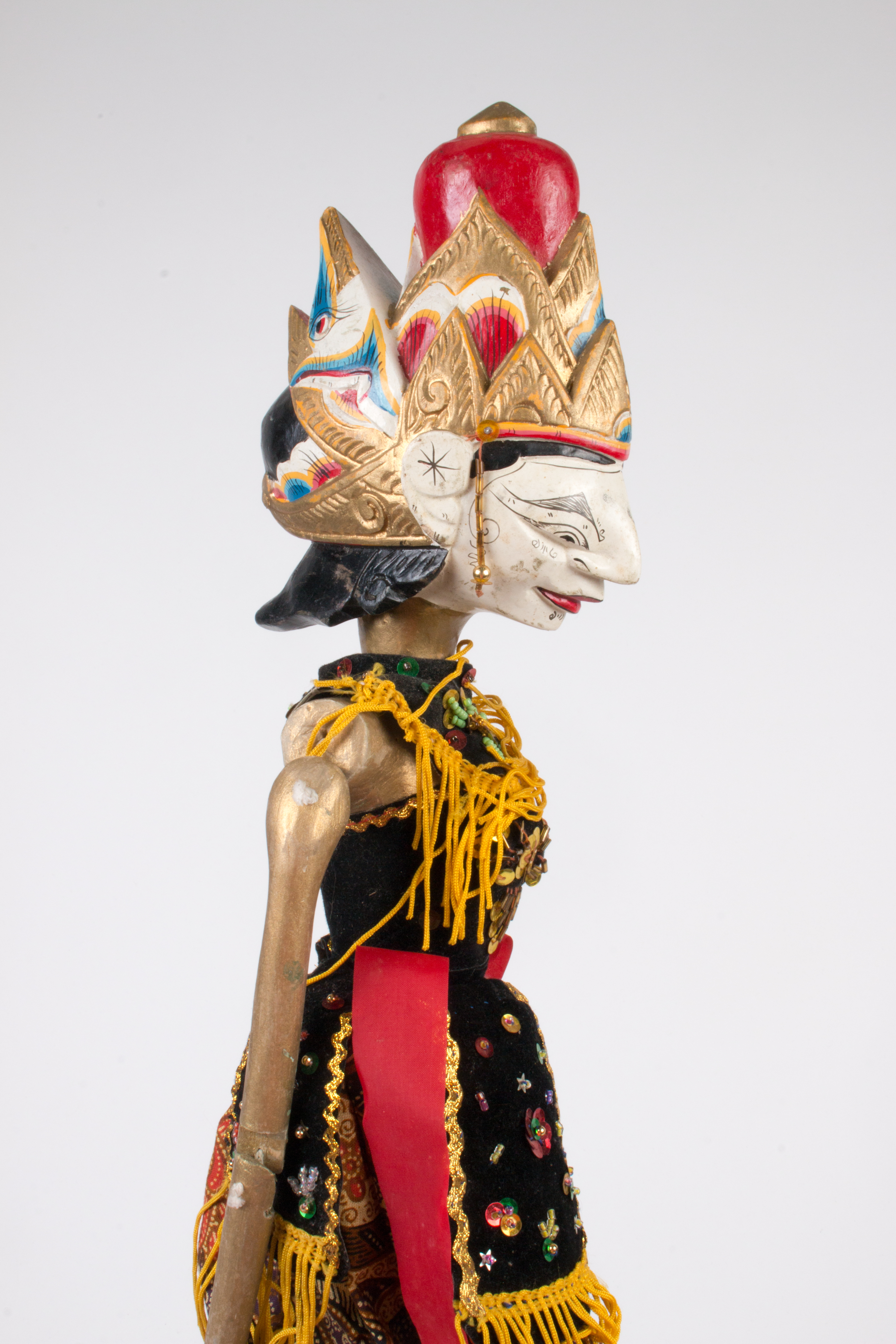
Wayang golek, Indonesia, 2004

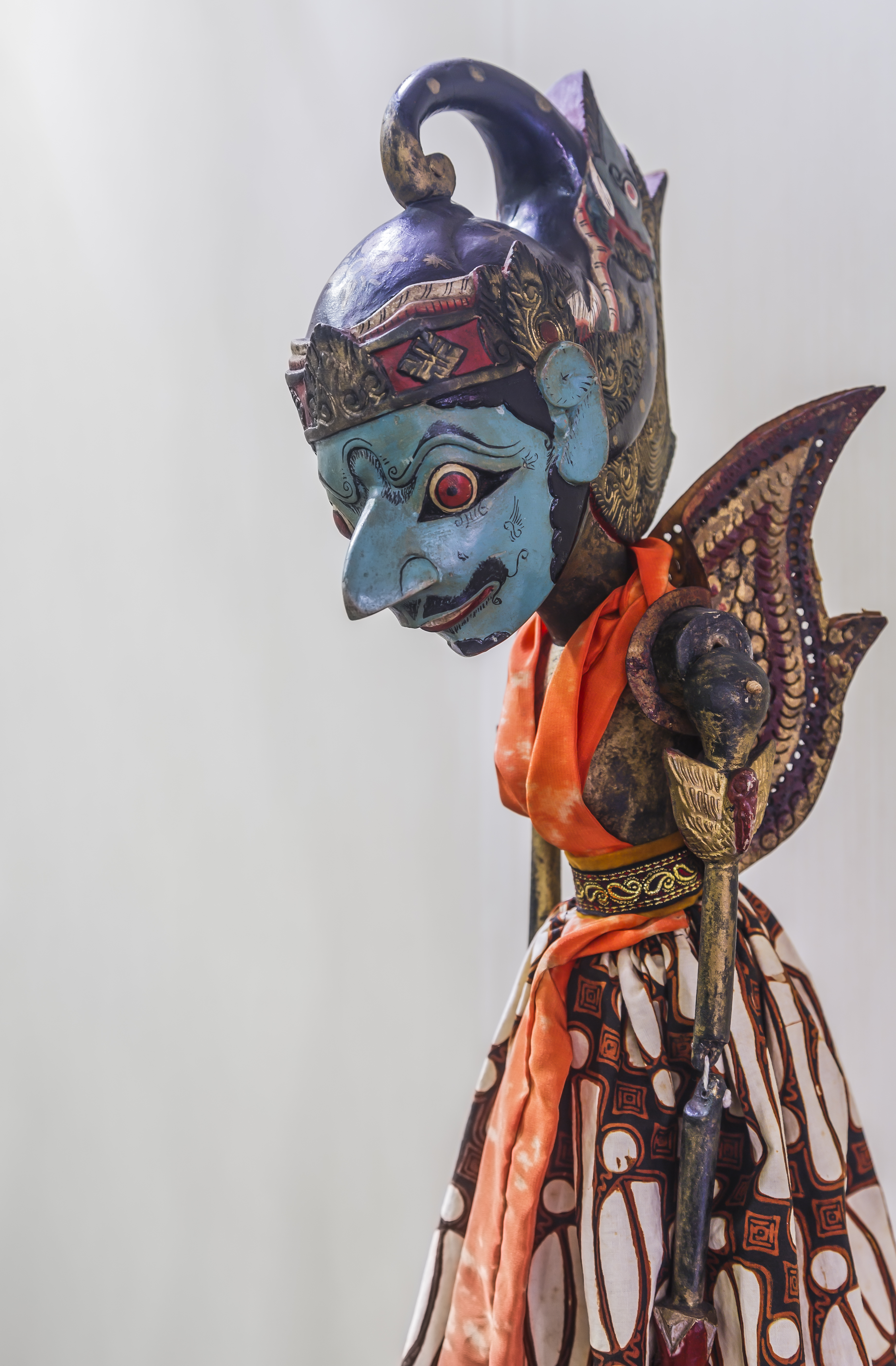
Wayang golek, Gatotkaca, Indonesia, 2015

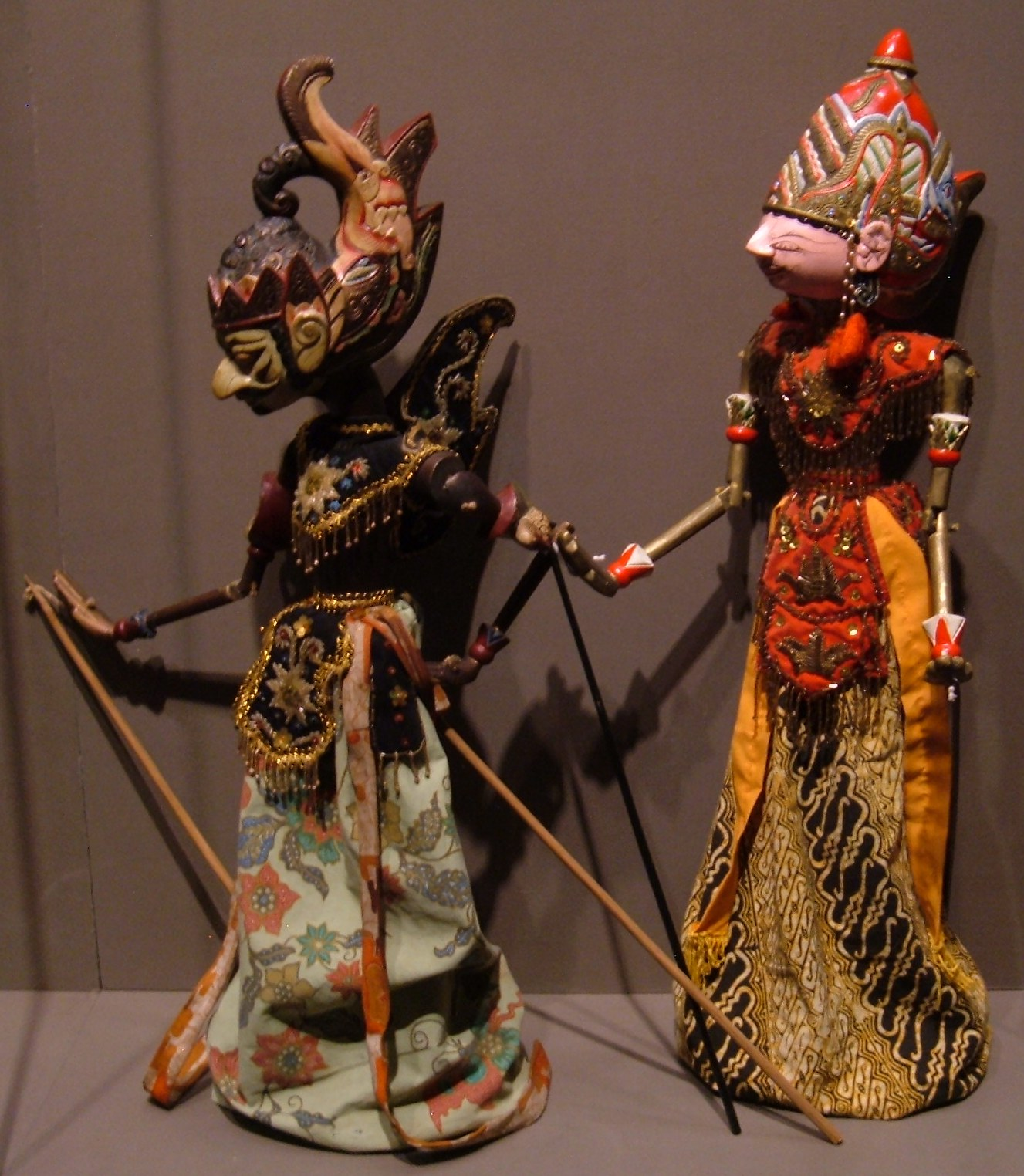
Pair of wayang golek from Java, Indonesia on display at the Asian Art Museum in San Francisco, California, 2007. Left: Gatotkaca Right Karna

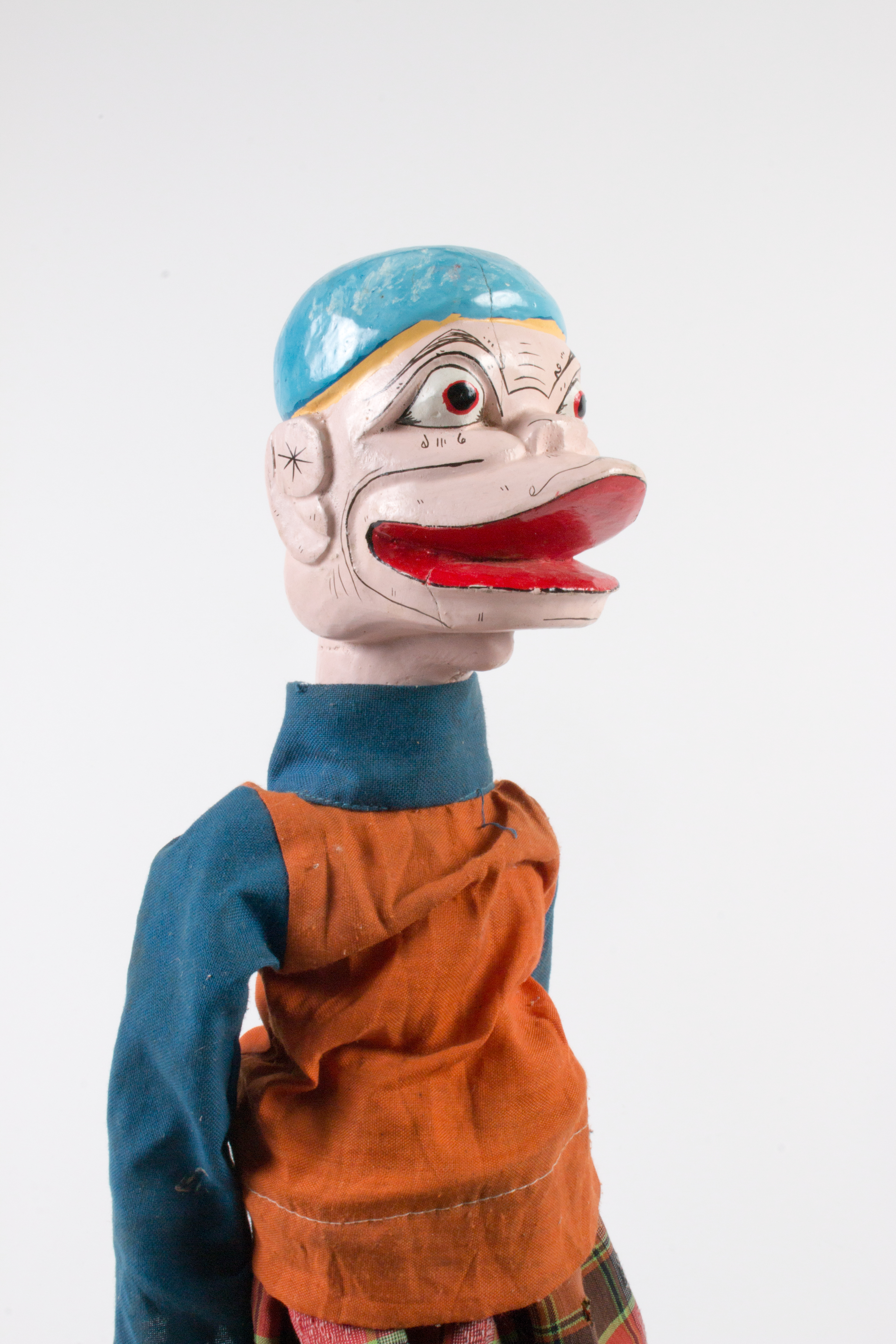
Wayang golek, Togog, Indonesia, before 1999
Some Wayang Golek Menak Figures

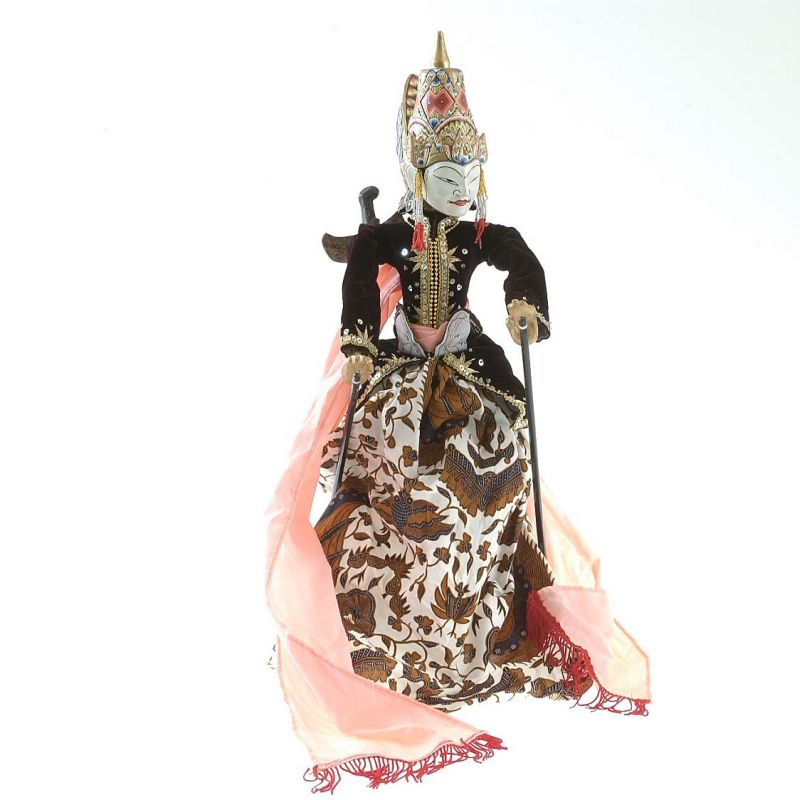
Wayang golek menak, Jayengrana, collection of Tropenmuseum, Netherlands, before 2003

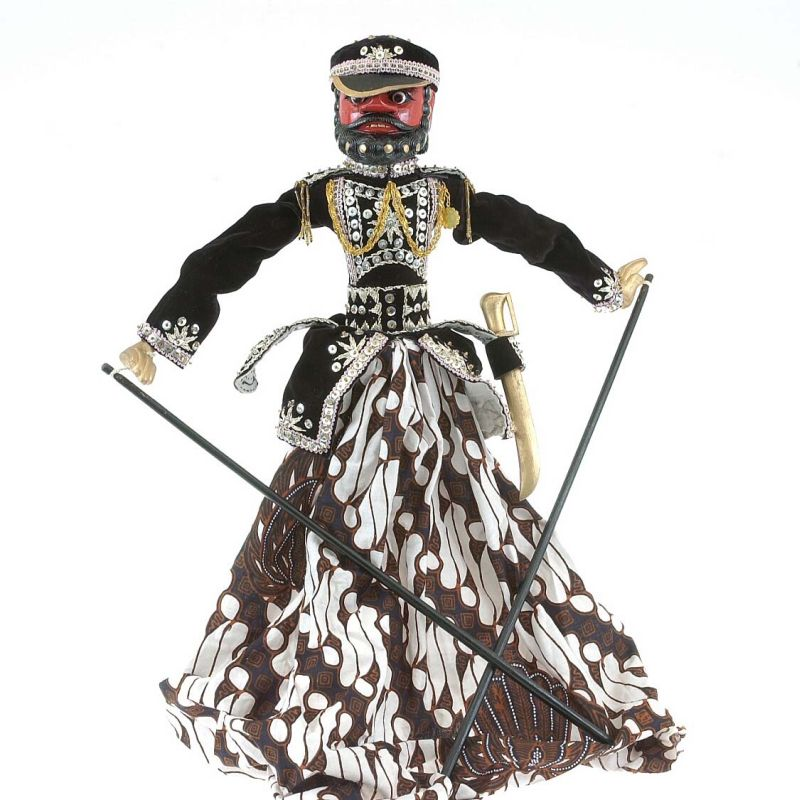
Wayang golek menak, Umarmaya, collection of Tropenmuseum, Netherlands, before 2003

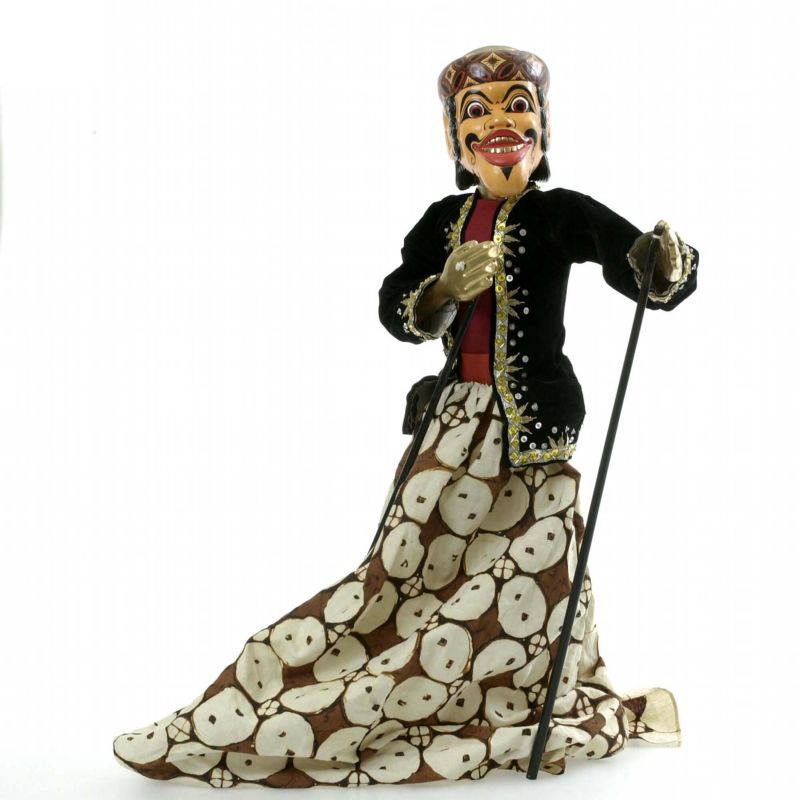
Wayang golek menak, Umarmadi, collection of Tropenmuseum, Netherlands, before 2003

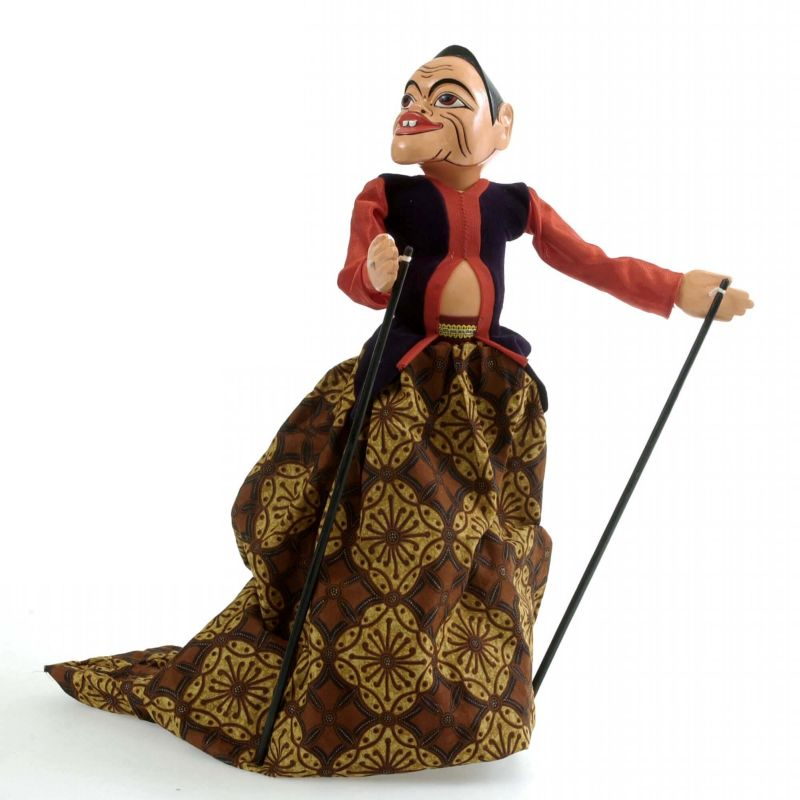
Wayang golek menak, Jiweng, collection of Tropenmuseum, Netherlands, before 2003

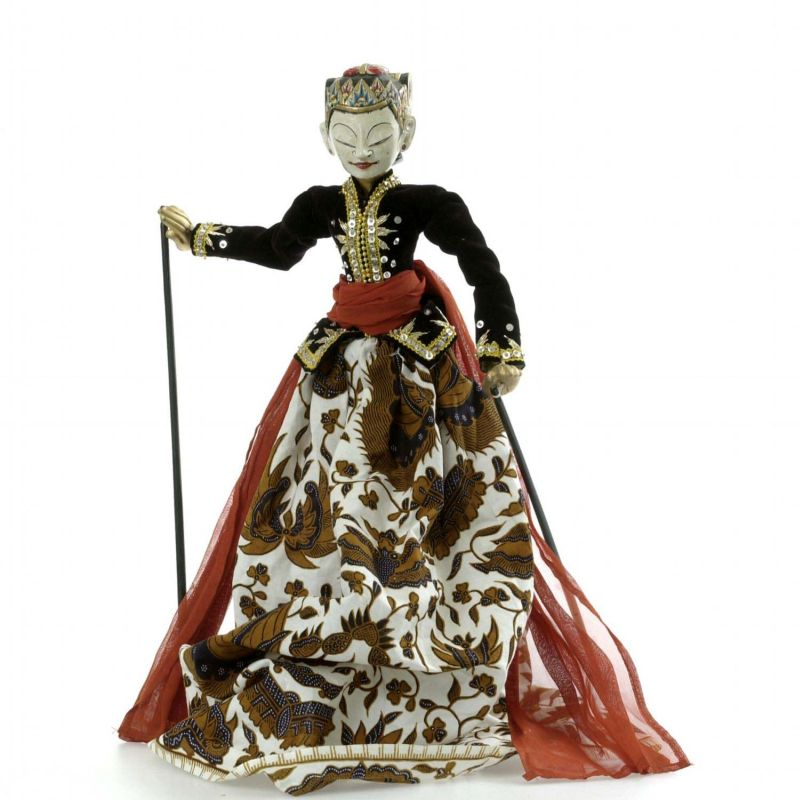
Wayang golek menak, Putri Murtinjung, collection of Tropenmuseum, Netherlands, before 2003

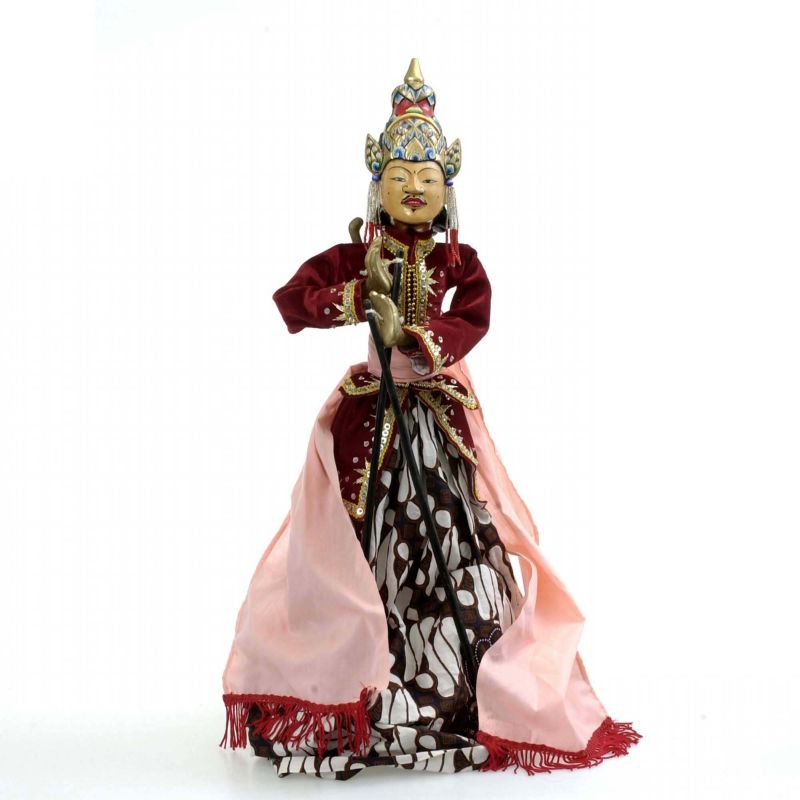
Wayang golek menak, King Maktal (Albania), collection of Tropenmuseum, Netherlands, before 2003

== See also ==
- Wayang
- Wayang kulit
- Wayang beber
- Wayang wong
- Wayang klitik
- Nang yai, Thai equivalent
- Nang talung, Thai equivalent
