= Margahayu =

Coordinates: 6°59′58″S 107°37′17″E

- Interactive map of Margahayu
- Country: Indonesia
- Province: West Java
- Regency: Bandung

Area
  - Total: 10.64 km^{2} (4.11 sq mi)

Population
  - Total: 121,324
  - Density: 11,400/km^{2} (29,530/sq mi)
- Time zone: UTC+7 (IWST)

Margahayu is an administrative district (Kecamatan) in the Bandung Regency, in the West Java Province of Indonesia. The district is a plain area with an altitude between 500 m to 1,800 m above sea level. It is located southwest of the major West Java city of Bandung. Although outside of the city itself, the district is highly urbanised, with a population of 121,324 people in 2025, and an average density of over 11,400 per km^{2}.

== Administrative divisions ==
Margahayu District is divided into the following five administrative villages - one (Sulaiman) classed as urban (kelurahan) in the south of the district, and four classed as nominally rural desa.

Kode wilayah	Village	Area in km^{2}	Population estimate mid 2025	Post Code
32.04.09.2001	Margahayu Tengah	1.27	19,334	40225
32.04.09.2002	Margahayu Seletan	1.88	34,150	40226
32.04.09.2003	Sukamenak	1.88	30,050	40227
32.04.10.1004	Sulaiman	3.96	4,455	40229
32.04.10.2005	Sayati	1.67	33,335	40228
Totals		10.64	121,324	
