= Katapang =

Coordinates: 6°59′58″S 107°37′17″E

- Interactive map of Katapang
- Country: Indonesia
- Province: West Java
- Regency: Bandung

Area
  - Total: 16.25 km^{2} (6.27 sq mi)

Population
  - Total: 140,044
  - Density: 8,618/km^{2} (22,320/sq mi)
- Time zone: UTC+7 (IWST)

Katapang is an administrative district (Kecamatan) in the Bandung Regency, in the West Java Province of Indonesia. The district is located south of the major West Java city of Bandung. Although outside of the city itself, the district is highly urbanised, with a population of 140,044 people in 2025, and an average density of 8,618 per km^{2}.

== Administrative divisions ==
The Katapang District is divided into the following seven administrative villages - all classed as nominally rural desa and sharing the post code of 40921.

Kode wilayah	Village	Area in km^{2}	Population estimate 2025
32.04.11.2001	Sangkanhurip	3.24	35,885
32.04.11.2002	Katapang (village)	2.29	16,524
32.04.11.2004	Gandasari	1.61	18,454
32.04.11.2006	Sukamukti	3.19	20,112
32.04.11.2007	Cilampeni	2.26	21,659
32.04.11.2008	Pangauban	1.66	17,716
32.04.11.2009	Banyusari	2.00	9,694
Totals		16.25	140,044
