= Cilengkrang =

Coordinates: 6°59′58″S 107°37′17″E

- Interactive map of Cilengkrang
- Country: Indonesia
- Province: West Java
- Regency: Bandung

Area
  - Total: 35.11 km^{2} (13.56 sq mi)

Population
  - Total: 55,821
  - Density: 1,590/km^{2} (4,118/sq mi)
- Time zone: UTC+7 (IWST)

Curug Cilengkrang

Cilengkrang is an administrative district (Kecamatan) in the Bandung Regency, in the West Java Province of Indonesia. Based on its topography, Cilengkrang District has a varied terrain, ranging from lowlands to hills that form part of the foothills of Mount Manglayang. The elevation of this area ranges from 600 metres above sea level to 1,400 metres above sea level. These conditions significantly influence the cool climate and the dominant land use for agriculture, residential areas and conservation zones. Although outside of the city itself, the district is fairly urbanised, with a population of 55,821 people in 2025 (comprising 28,282 males and 27,539 females), giving an average density of 1,590 per km^{2}.

== Administrative divisions ==
The Cilengkrang District is divided into the following six administrative villages - all classed as nominally rural desa.

Kode wilayah	Village	Area in km^{2}	Population estimate 2025	Post code
32.04.07.2006	Girimekar	5.47	14,414	40619
32.04.07.2001	Jatiendah	1.46	18,734	40616
32.04.07.2004	Melatiwangi	2.31	5,355	40618
32.04.07.2003	Cipanjalu	15.78	6,269	40618
32.04.07.2005	Ciporeat	6.35	6,205	40617
32.04.07.2002	Cilengkrang (village)	3.75	4,844	40615
Totals		35.11	55,821	
