= Cepot =

Wayang golek character

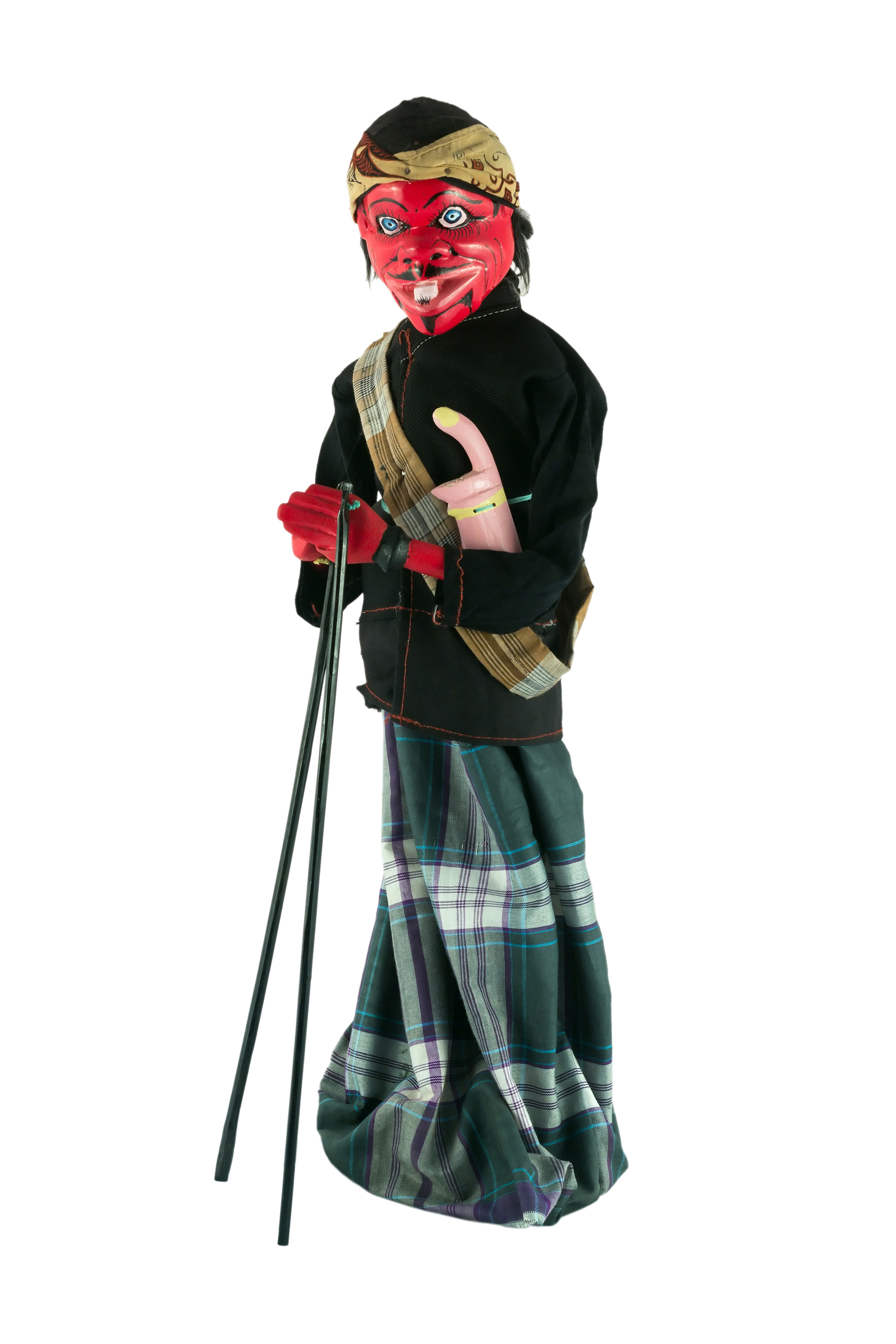
Cepot, as a wayang golek puppet

Cepot or Astrajingga is one of the wayang golek characters in Sundanese puppetry. Cepot is a punokawan alongside Dawala and Garéng, which do not exist in the original Mahabharata or Ramayana. Cepot is one of Semar's sons. Cepot is a rural character from the fictional village Tumaritis, where he lived with his father Semar and two of his brothers, Petruk and Dawala. Cepot is humorous and easy going, everything Cepot says tends to be funny, and Cepot's act has many slapstick jokes, mostly done together with its antagonist wayang golek character. Cepot in wayang golek puppetry also has other, good looking faces: Astrajingga, described with its straight, humble, good looking and white face. Cepot is the favourite character of Sundanese Indonesian wayang golek maestro Asep Sunandar Sunarya.
