= Pangalengan =

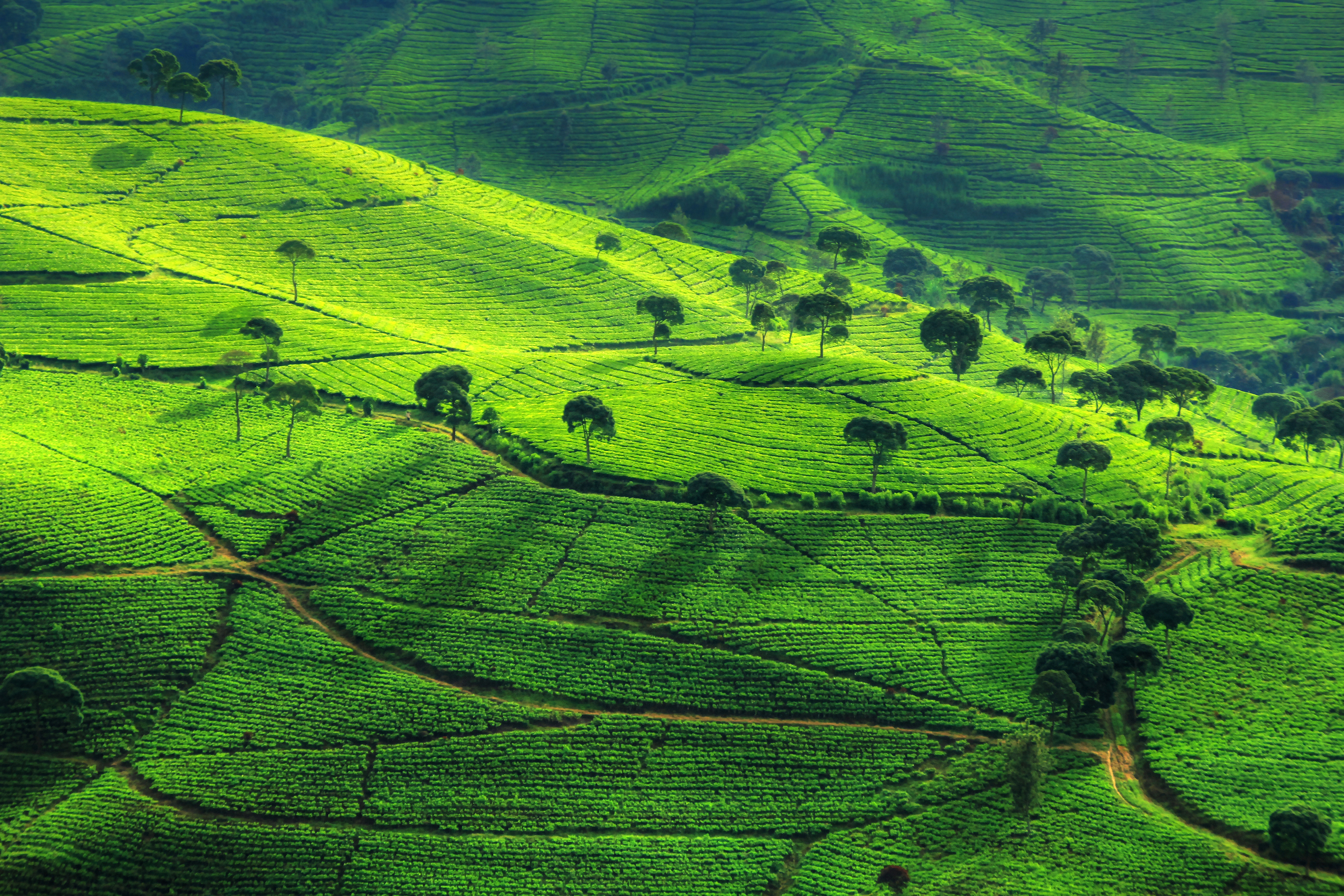
- Tea plantations are commons in Pangalengan
- Interactive map of Pangalengan
- Country: Indonesia
- Province: West Java
- Regency: Bandung

Area
  - Total: 216.70 km^{2} (83.67 sq mi)

Population
  - Total: 169,257
  - Density: 781.07/km^{2} (2,023.0/sq mi)
- Time zone: UTC+7 (IWST)

Pangalengan is an administrative district (Kecamatan) in the Bandung Regency, part of the West Java Province of Indonesia. It is located 48 kilometres (30 mi) south of the major West Java city of Bandung.

Main industries of the Pangalengan District include dairy farming and tourism, the latter arising from the popularity of the many traditional villages and natural attractions such as lakes, ponds, hot springs and waterfalls in the district. The area is an important centre of activity for the tea industry in Indonesia. There is also considerable interest in the potential for the use of geothermal sites in the region for the production of electricity. The Wayang Windu plant, the largest geothermal plant in Indonesia with a capacity of 227 megawatts, is located to the east of Pangalengan on the slopes of the Wayang Windu volcano. The site has been jointly developed by Star Energy and PT Pertamina Geothermal Energy, a subsidiary of the large state-owned oil company Pertamina. The activity has not been without controversy however and local people near the site have sometimes protested about certain aspects of the development.

Pangalengan District became a major site for the placement of refugees (internally displaced persons, or IDPs) after the large West Java earthquake in September 2009. Following the earthquake, it was estimated that 50,000 homes had been destroyed in the area, 80,000 people had been left homeless, and around 250,000 people had been displaced.

== Administrative divisions ==
Pangalengan is divided into the following thirteen administrative villages, all classed as rural desa, listed below with their areas and their populations as at 2025:

Kode wilayah	Village (desa)	Area in km^{2}	Population Census 2010	Population estimate 2025
Wanasuka	32.04.15.2012	31.98	4,740	4,833
Banjarsari	32.04.15.2008	25.61	5,500	6,114
Margaluyu	32.04.15.2002	14.04	8,440	9,926
Sukaluyu	32.04.15.2009	21.88	8,310	10,248
Warnasari	32.04.15.2003	24.66	7,890	10,264
Pulosari	32.04.15.2011	19.01	9,710	12,661
Margamekar	32.04.15.2013	5.61	8,050	10,714
Sukamanah	32.04.15.2004	6.39	18,300	22,556
Margamukti	32.04.15.2006	23.89	15,940	19,110
Pangalengan	32.04.15.2001	6.60	20,510	23,522
Margamulya	32.04.15.2007	17.37	15,680	20,360
Tribaktimulya	32.04.15.2010	4.77	5,150	6,564
Lamajang	32.04.15.2005	14.90	10,050	12,385
Totals for	District	216.70	138,269	169,257

== Nature reserves ==
- Malabar
- Mount Tilu (shared with Pasirjambu)

== Mountains and volcanoes ==
- Malabar Mountain (Besar peak is located entirely within Pangalengan, Haruman peak is shared with Cimaung) and several peaks and hills around it
- Mount Bedil
- Wayang Volcano (shared with Kertasari)
- Windu Volcano
- Mount Kencana
- Mount Riung Gunung
- Mount Waringin (shared with Pasirjambu)
- Mount Tilu

== Tourism ==
A shortage of good roads in the area is believed to have held back development. However, the area is attractive and was formerly well known for tourist spots in the Malabar region.

Some of the tea estates in the area provide good facilities for tourists to stay overnight, walk through tracks in the tea plantations, and bath in nearby hot springs.

Main tourism sites near Pangalengan include the following.

- Cultural or historical sites such as the Cikondang traditional village, and the gravesite of the Dutchman K.A.R. Bosscha who played a key role in helping develop the tea industry in the area.
- Tea and quinine estates such as the Malabar estate and estates at Kertamanah, Purbasari, Pasir Junghuhn, Pasirmalang, Cukul, and the Indonesian Research Institute for Tea and Quinine at Gambang.
- Various lakes, of which the most well-known is Lake Cileunca, along with Lake Cipanunjang
- Small lakes like Gede, Datar, Cukul, Cicoledas, and Kanceuh
- Numerous hot springs
- Waterfalls such as Panganten, Malabar, Patra, Sanghiang, and Bangku Waterfall
- Wayang-Windu bike park
- Cukul sunrise point
