= Margaasih =

Coordinates: 6°59′58″S 107°37′17″E

- Interactive map of Margaasih
- Country: Indonesia
- Province: West Java
- Regency: Bandung

Area
  - Total: 18.16 km^{2} (7.01 sq mi)

Population
  - Total: 155,740
  - Density: 8,576/km^{2} (22,210/sq mi)
- Time zone: UTC+7 (IWST)

Margaasih is an administrative district (Kecamatan) in the Bandung Regency, in the West Java Province of Indonesia. The district is a plain area with an altitude between 500 m to 1,800 m above sea level. It is located southwest of the major West Java city of Bandung. Although outside of the city itself, the district is highly urbanised, with a population of 155,740 people in 2025, and an average density of over 8,500 per km^{2}.

== Administrative divisions ==
Margaasih District is divided into the following six administrative villages - all classed as nominally rural desa.

Kode wilayah	Village	Area in km^{2}	Population estimate 2025	Post Code
32.04.10.2001	Margaasih (village)	2.94	26,611	40215
32.04.10.2002	Lagadar	4.32	27,205	40216
32.04.10.2003	Nanjung	3.46	20,076	40217
32.04.10.2004	Mekarrahayu	3.15	37,225	40218
32.04.10.2005	Rahayu	2.93	29,857	40218
32.04.10.2006	Cigondewah Hilir	1.36	14,766	40214
Totals		18.16	155,740	
