= Dayeuhkolot =

Coordinates: 6°59′58″S 107°37′17″E

- Interactive map of Dayeuhkolot
- Country: Indonesia
- Province: West Java
- Regency: Bandung

Area
  - Total: 11.28 km^{2} (4.36 sq mi)

Population
  - Total: 106,900
  - Density: 9,477/km^{2} (24,550/sq mi)
- Time zone: UTC+7 (IWST)

Dayeuhkolot is an administrative district (Kecamatan) in the Bandung Regency, in the West Java Province of Indonesia. The district is located south of the major West Java city of Bandung. Although outside of the city itself, the district is highly urbanised, with a population of 106,900 people in 2025, and an average density of 9,477 per km^{2}.

== Administrative divisions ==
The Dayeuhkolot District is divided into the following six administrative villages - the urban kelurahan of Pasawahan and five classed as nominally rural desa. Cangkuang Kulon and Cangkuang Wetan are situated in the west, Pasawahan in the centre and the other three desa in the east of the district.

Kode wilayah	Village	Area in km^{2}	Population estimate 2025	Post code
32.04.12.1001	Pasawahan	2.08	10,408	40256
32.04.12.2002	Dayeuhkolot (village)	0.74	13,620	40258
32.04.12.2003	Cangkuang Wetan	2.23	19,340	40258
32.04.12.2004	Cangkuang Kulon	2.44	36,571	40259
32.04.12.2005	Sukapura	1.78	8,103	40267
32.04.12.2006	Cireureup	2.01	18,858	40257
Totals		11.28	106,900	
