= Bojongsoang =

Coordinates: 6°59′58″S 107°37′17″E

- Interactive map of Bojongsoang
- Country: Indonesia
- Province: West Java
- Regency: Bandung

Area
  - Total: 28.32 km^{2} (10.93 sq mi)

Population
  - Total: 113,191
  - Density: 3,997/km^{2} (10,350/sq mi)
- Time zone: UTC+7 (IWST)

Bojongsoang is an administrative district (Kecamatan) in the Bandung Regency, in the West Java Province of Indonesia. The district is located southeast of the major West Java city of Bandung. Although outside of the city itself, the district is highly urbanised, with a population of 113,191 people in 2025 (comprising 57,038 males and 56,153 females), and an average density of 3,997 per km^{2}.

== Administrative divisions ==
The Bojongsoang District is divided into the following six administrative villages - all classed as nominally rural desa. Tegalluar is situated in the east, Buahbatu in the centre and the other four desa in the west of the district.

| Kode wilayah | Village | Area in km^{2} | Population estimate 2025 | Post code |
|---|---|---|---|---|
| 32.04.08.2005 | Bojongsari | 4.12 | 20,170 | 40288 |
| 32.04.08.2002 | Bojongsoang (village) | 3.92 | 22,064 | 40288 |
| 32.04.08.2001 | Lengkong ^{(a)} | 3.24 | 16,154 | 40287 |
| 32.04.08.2004 | Cipagalo | 3.13 | 21,161 | 40287 |
| 32.04.08.2003 | Buahbatu ^{(b)} | 5.45 | 15,057 | 40287 |
| 32.04.08.2006 | Tegalluar | 8.46 | 18,585 | 40287 |
| Totals | | 28.32 | 113,191 | |

Note: (a) not to be confused with Lengkong District across the border in Bandung city.
(b) not to be confused with Buahbatu District across the border in Bandung city.
