= Cimenyan =

Coordinates: 6°59′58″S 107°37′17″E

- Interactive map of Cimenyan
- Country: Indonesia
- Province: West Java
- Regency: Bandung

Area
  - Total: 47.68 km^{2} (18.41 sq mi)

Population
  - Total: 113,982
  - Density: 2,391/km^{2} (6,192/sq mi)
- Time zone: UTC+7 (IWST)

Cimenyan is an administrative district (Kecamatan) in the Bandung Regency, in the West Java Province of Indonesia. The district is located immediately north of the major West Java city of Bandung. Cimenyan District is located in the northern part of Bandung Regency, situated in a hilly area directly bordering the city of Bandung. The geographical coordinates of Cimenyan District are 107° 37’ - 107° 43’ East Longitude and 6° 50’ - 6° 56’ South Latitude, while topographically the district features a terrain dominated by hills and slopes with elevations ranging from 700 m above sea level to 1,300 m above sea level. This elevation gives the Cimenyan area a cool climate and a landscape suitable for highland agriculture, nature conservation, and tourist areas.

Although outside of the city itself, much of the district is highly urbanised (especially the two kelurahan of Padasuka and Cibeunying in the southwest of the regency), with a population of 113,982 people in 2025 (comprising 57,933 males and 56,049 females), and an average density of 2,391 per km^{2}.

== Administrative divisions ==
The Cimenyan District is divided into the following nine administrative villages - two (Padasuka and Cibeunying) classed as urban kelurahan and seven classed as nominally rural desa.

| Kode wilayah | Village | Area in km^{2} | Population estimate 2025 | Post code |
|---|---|---|---|---|
| 32.04.06.1001 | Padasuka | 1.60 | 17,584 | 40191 |
| 32.04.06.1002 | Cibeunying | 4.60 | 28,435 | 40191 |
| 32.04.06.2003 | Cimenyan (village) | 9.54 | 16,439 | 40197 |
| 32.04.06.2004 | Mandalamekar | 2.05 | 7,327 | 40193 |
| 32.04.06.2005 | Cikadut | 3.37 | 10,718 | 40191 |
| 32.04.06.2006 | Ciburial | 7.67 | 12,706 | 40198 |
| 32.04.06.2007 | Sindanglaya | 1.83 | 6,900 | 40195 |
| 32.04.06.2008 | Mekarsaluyu | 4.73 | 4,405 | 40198 |
| 32.04.06.2009 | Mekarmanik | 12.29 | 9,468 | 40196 |
| Totals | | 47.68 | 113,982 | |
