= Baleendah =

Coordinates: 6°59′58″S 107°37′17″E

- Interactive map of Baleendah
- Country: Indonesia
- Province: West Java
- Regency: Bandung

Area
  - Total: 40.70 km^{2} (15.71 sq mi)

Population
  - Total: 280,359
  - Density: 6,888/km^{2} (17,840/sq mi)
- Time zone: UTC+7 (IWST)

Baleendah is a district (Kecamatan) in the Bandung Regency, in the West Java Province of Indonesia. The district is a plain area with an altitude between 500 m to 1,800 m above sea level. It is located 14 kilometres (8.7 mi) south of the major West Java city of Bandung. Although outside of the city itself, the district is highly urbanised, with a population of over 280,000 people in 2025, and an average density of over 6,888 per km^{2}.

== Administrative divisions ==
Baleendah is divided into the following eight administrative villages - five urban Kelurahan (listed first in the table below) and three nominally rural desa.

Kode wilayah	Village	Area in km^{2}	Population Census 2010	Population Census 2020	Population estimate mid 2025
32.04.32.1001	Baleendah (village)	7.33	55,320	59,418	63,392
32.04.32.1002	Andir	3.98	30,730	33,373	35,709
32.04.32.1003	Manggahang	6.17	32,580	39,305	41,727
32.04.32.1004	Jelekong	7.88	21,390	25,738	27,409
32.04.32.1008	Wargamekar	7.13	19,470	23,308	24,785
32.04.32.2005	Bojongmalaka	2.60	19,470	25,054	26,234
32.04.32.2006	Rancamanyar	3.78	29,260	43,076	44,970
32.04.32.2007	Malakasari	1.84	12,540	14,452	16,133
	Totals	40.70	220,760	263,724	280,359
