= Ciparay =

Coordinates: 6°59′58″S 107°37′17″E

- Interactive map of Ciparay
- Country: Indonesia
- Province: West Java
- Regency: Bandung

Area
  - Total: 52.42 km^{2} (20.24 sq mi)

Population
  - Total: 187,055
  - Density: 3,568/km^{2} (9,242/sq mi)
- Time zone: UTC+7 (IWST)

Ciparay is a village and an administrative district (Kecamatan) in the Bandung Regency, in the West Java Province of Indonesia. The district is a plain area with an altitude between 500 m to 1,800 m above sea level. It is located southeast of the major West Java city of Bandung. Although outside of the city itself, the district is highly urbanised, with a population of 187,055 people in 2025, and an average density of 3,568 per km^{2}.

== Administrative divisions ==
Ciparay District is divided into the following fourteen administrative villages - all classed as nominally rural desa, and sharing the postcode 40381.

Kode wilayah	Village	Area in km^{2}	Population estimate 2025
32.04.29.2001	Ciparay (village)	2.92	8,523
32.04.29.2002	Gunungleutik	0.74	12,681
32.04.29.2003	Mekarsari	2.59	13,897
32.04.29.2004	Cikoneng	2.64	7,972
32.04.29.2005	Ciheulang	4.60	18,154
32.04.29.2006	Pakutandang	2.97	20,159
32.04.29.2007	Sumbersari	8.60	18,880
32.04.29.2008	Mangungharja	1.63	13,826
32.04.29.2009	Sagaracipta	2.63	10,145
32.04.29.2010	Sarimahi	3.19	10,856
32.04.29.2011	Serangmekar	2.68	13,036
32.04.29.2012	Babakan	9.80	9,018
32.04.29.2013	Bumiwangi	4.79	18,607
32.04.29.2014	Mekarsaksana	2.64	11,301
Totals		52.42	187,055
