= Pulosari, West Java =

Pulosari
- Village
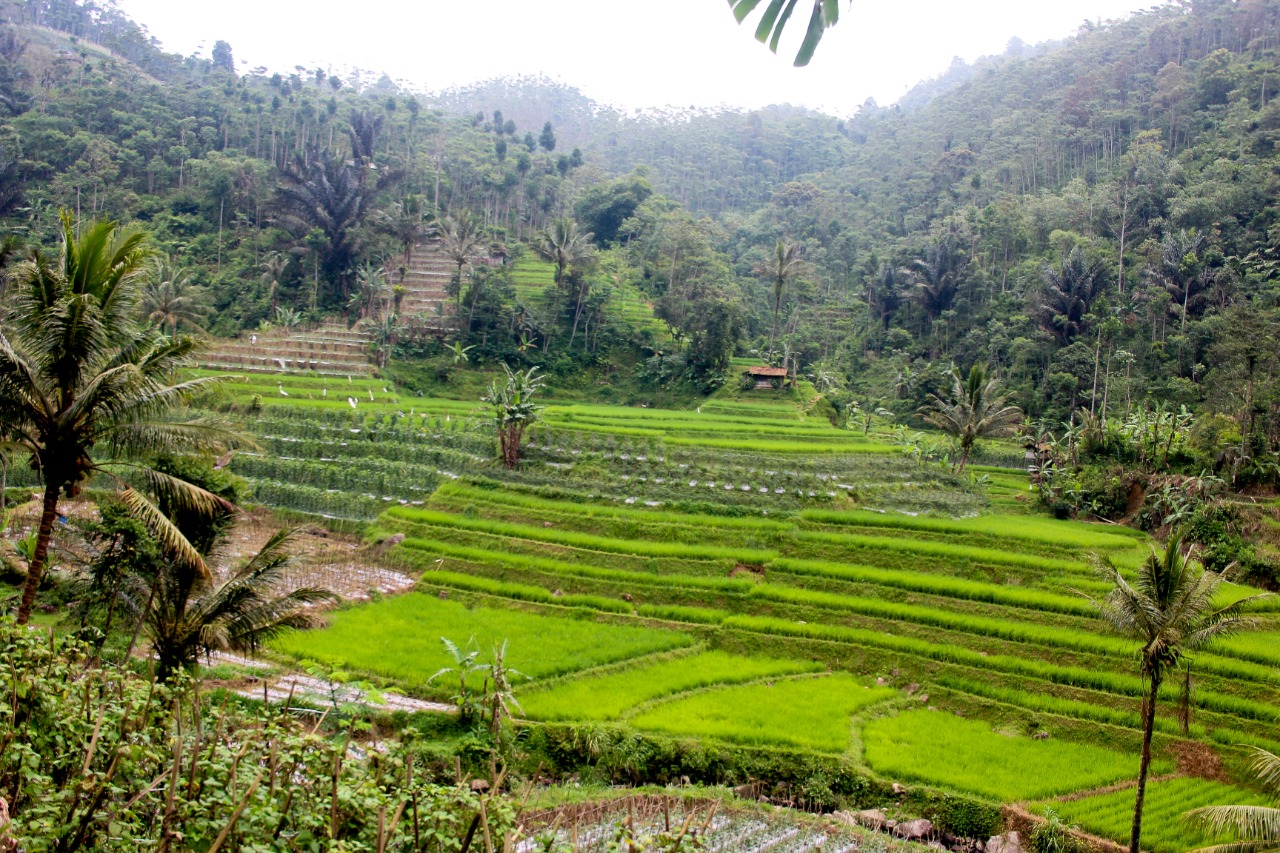
- Interactive map of Pulosari
- Coordinates: 6.786361°S 106.659167°E
- Country: Indonesia
- Province: West Java
- Regency: Sukabumi
- District: Kalapanunggal
- Region Code: 32.02.18.2003.

Area
  - Total: 2,632 ha (6,500 acres)

Pulosari (Indonesian pronunciation: [puloˈsari]) is a village located in Kalapanunggal district of the Sukabumi regency in West Java, Indonesia.

== Geography ==
Pulosari Village is located at coordinates 6 ° 47'10.9 "South Latitude 106 ° 39'33.0" East Longitude. The village borders the Mount Halimun Salak National Park in the north, then borders the Makasari and Gunung Endut village in the East, borders Palasari Girang and Walangsari village in the South, and borders the Kabandungan village from Kabandungan district in the west.

The total area of Pulosari Village is 2,632 ha/m^{2} which consists of settlements covering an area of 65.27 ha/m^{2}; rice fields covering 286.4 ha/m^{2}; plantation land covering an area of 430 ha/m^{2}; burial land covering an area of 3 ha/m^{2}; and yards covering an area of 24.1 ha/m^{2}.

== Tourism ==
Pulosari Village offers natural attractions such as White Stone Waterfall and Bukit Cinta.

=== White Stone Waterfall ===
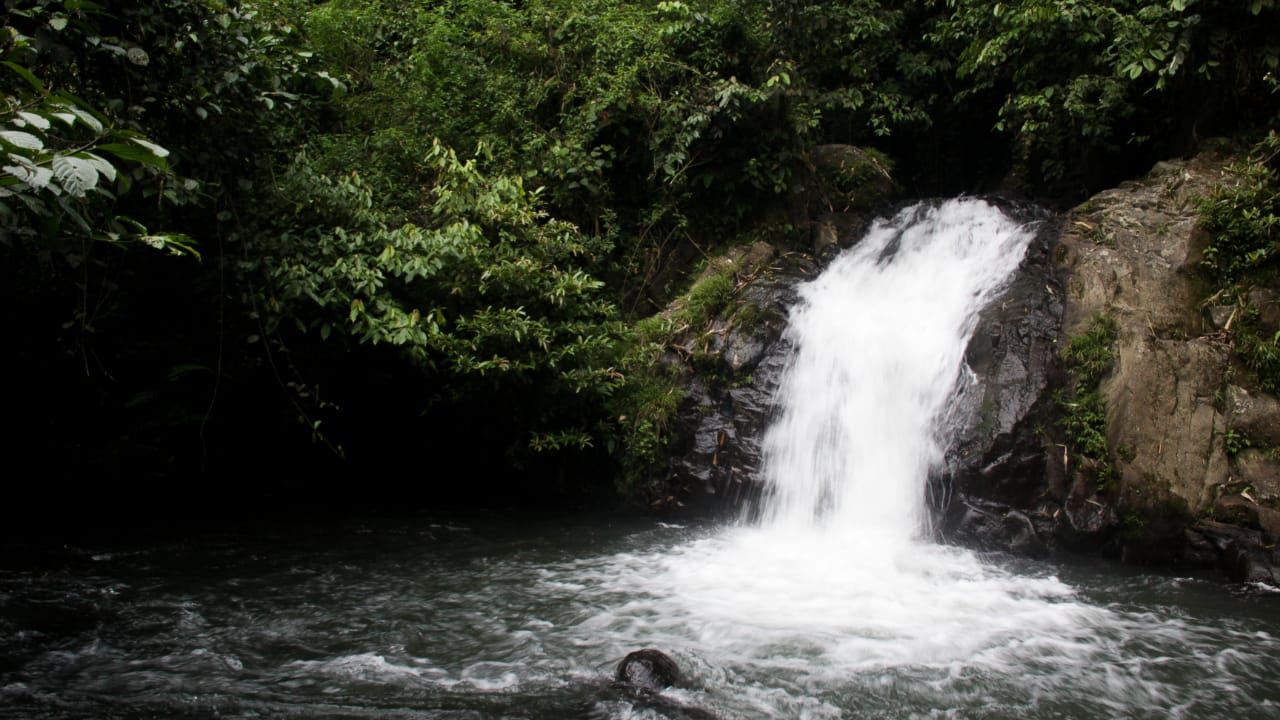
White Stone Waterfall, Curug Batu Bodas in Indonesian

White Stone Waterfall is located around 500 m (1,600 ft) from Kampung Cigoong. The waterfall's Indonesian name is Curug Batu Bodas. The origin of the name "bodas" which means "white" or "holy" in Sundanese is inspired by a tall white rock like a cliff. Before reaching the falls there is natural formation known as Tangga Seribu or the Thousand Stairs.

White Stone Waterfall officially became a natural tourist attraction in July 2020 in an effort to increase the village economy and reduce unemployment. Some residents expressed concern over the potential increase in litter. Tourists who want to visit the waterfall are encouraged to follow the local customs.

The falls are also considered a religious site. Local residents who have a strong animism belief recognize the waterfall as a place of pilgrimage. Residents have voiced reservations, fearing that the waterfall might be used for romantic trysts, negatively impacting religious uses. Compounding their concern is the need to maintain the "purity" of parts of the falls.

Kahuripan and Cipabeasan waters are reserved for bathing, and tourists are asked to keep eating and swimming at the waterfall to designated areas. When the falls were officially opened for tourism, residents in the area hoped the government would provide facilities – rest areas and prayer rooms specifically – to accommodate the expected influx of tourists.

Access to the waterfall is still difficult; it is not reachable by car.

== Resources ==
Pulosari Village, especially Cigoong, has great potential for palm sugar plantations. Villagers agree to share the management of the palm sugar trees that are located around White Stone Waterfall among all residents. Each resident manages a tree and has the freedom to choose what to produce or how to best utilize their tree. The price of one toros is five pieces or fifty thousand rupiah.

Agricultural and plantation products marketed from Pulosari include bananas, papaya, nutmeg, green beans, eggplant, cucumber, chili, cassava, and rice. The livestock sector is dominated mostly by poultry.
