= Mount Wayang-Windu =

Twin volcano in West Java

Wayang-Windu
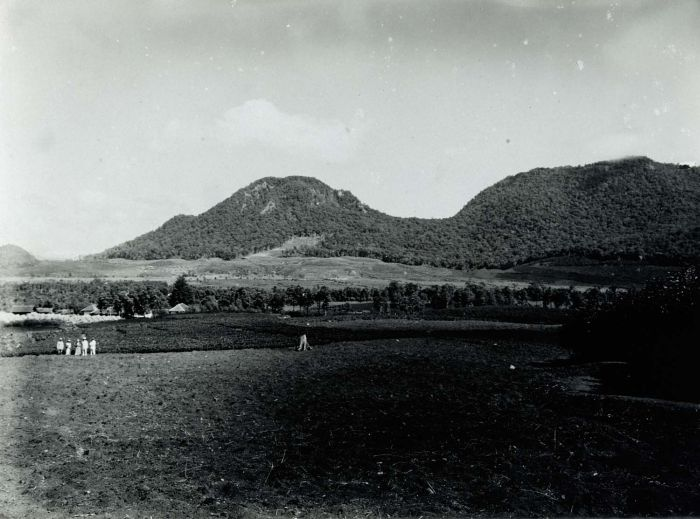

Highest point
- Elevation: 2,182 m (7,159 ft)
- Coordinates: 7.208°S 107.63°E

Geography
- Location: Java, Indonesia

Geology
- Mountain type: Lava dome
- Volcanic arc: Sunda Arc

Wayang-Windu is a twin volcano that consists of Mount Wayang (Indonesian: Gunung Wayang, "Mount Shadow") and Mount Windu. They are located just to the east of the town of Pangalengan in the Bandung Regency (Kabupaten or District) in West Java, Indonesia, about 40 km (25 mi) south of the city of Bandung. The area has been an active geothermal project. Mount Wayang has a 750 m (2,500 ft) wide crescentic crater which holds four groups of fumaroles. Mount Windu has a 350 m (1,100 ft) wide crater.

The Wayang-Windu mountain complex is part of the hydrological divide that separates two major river basin groups in Java, dividing the northern and southern regions. This hydrological boundary stretches from the east to the west of the Java Island. The eastern slopes of the Wayang-Windu mountains are part of the Citarum River basin system, where the tributaries originating from these mountain slopes merge with the main river flow, eventually flowing towards the northern coast of Java and discharging into the Java Sea. On the other hand, the western slopes are part of the Cilaki River basin system, where the tributaries from these mountain slopes join the main river and flow towards the southern coast of Java, ultimately reaching the Indian Ocean.

== See also ==
- Catchment hydrology
- Drainage divide
- Spring (hydrology)
- List of volcanoes in Indonesia
- Citarum river
- Cilaki river
