= Dadang Supriatna =

Indonesian politician (born 1971)

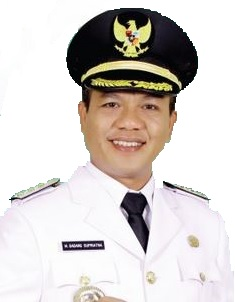
- Official portrait

Regent of Bandung
- Incumbent
- Assumed office 26 April 2021
- Preceded by: Dadang M. Nasser

Member of West Java Regional House of Representatives
- In office 2 September 2019 – September 2020

Member of Bandung Regency DPRD
- In office 5 August 2009 – 5 August 2019

Personal details
- Born: 7 August 1971 (age 54) Bandung Regency, West Java, Indonesia
- Political party: PKB (since 2020); Golkar (before 2020)

Dadang Supriatna (born 7 August 1971) is an Indonesian politician of the National Awakening Party who has served as the regent of Bandung Regency in West Java since 2021. Before becoming regent, he had been elected into the West Java Regional House of Representatives, and previously served two terms in the regency's legislature.

== Early life and education ==
Dadang Supriatna was born on 7 August 1971, in Tegalluar village of Bandung Regency, the youngest of nine children. His parents were Taher Kosasih, a farmer and brickmaker, and Siti Sada'ah. According to Supriatna, to fund his education, his father gave him 1,000 bricks. He completed his basic education in Bandung, graduating from high school in 1991. He would later receive a bachelor's and a master's degree from Langlangbuana University.

== Career ==
Starting in 1989, Supriatna established a brickmaking workshop and supplied other building materials. He became head of his home village at Tegalluar in 1998, being elected twice and serving until 2006. In 2009, he was elected into the Regional House of Representatives of Bandung Regency as a member of Golkar, and was reelected for a second term in 2014.

In the following election in 2019, Dadang was elected into the West Java Regional House of Representatives, and was sworn in on 2 September 2019. Immediately the following day, he publicly announced his intention to run in the 2020 regency election for Bandung Regency. As Golkar did not endorse his candidacy, Dadang moved to the National Awakening Party (PKB) and resigned from the legislature in September 2020. He ran in the election with the support of PKB, Nasdem, Demokrat, and PKS. The pair won 928,602 votes (56%), and after a rejected lawsuit to the Constitutional Court of Indonesia, was sworn in on 26 April 2021.

As regent, Supriatna sponsored a program which provided interest-free unsecured loans to small businesses amounting to Rp 2 million (US$130). According to the regency government, Rp 70 billion (US$4.5 million) had been disbursed by this program by late 2023. A subsidized fertilizer program for farmers was also launched. In October 2025, an autobiographical film of Supriatna was aired at Soreang (Bandung Regency's seat) Cultural Building.

== Family ==
Supriatna is married to Emma Dety Permanawati, and the couple has three children.
