= Kertasari =

- Country: Indonesia
- Province: West Java
- Regency: Bandung Regency

Area
  - Total: 152.98 km^{2} (59.07 sq mi)

Population
  - Total: 77,507
  - Density: 510/km^{2} (1,300/sq mi)

Kertasari is a district (Kecamatan) in the Bandung Regency, Indonesia. It is located 50 kilometres (31 mi) south of the major West Java city of Bandung.

== Administrative divisions ==
Kertasari is divided into 8 villages, which are

- Cibeureum
- Cihawuk
- Cikembang
- Neglawangi
- Resmitinggal
- Santosa
- Sukapura
- Tarumajaya
