= Bandung Regency =

Regency in West Java, Indonesia

Bandung Regency Kabupaten Bandung
- Regency

Regional transcription(s)
  - Sundanese: ᮊᮘᮥᮕᮒᮦᮔ᮪ ᮘᮔ᮪ᮓᮥᮀ
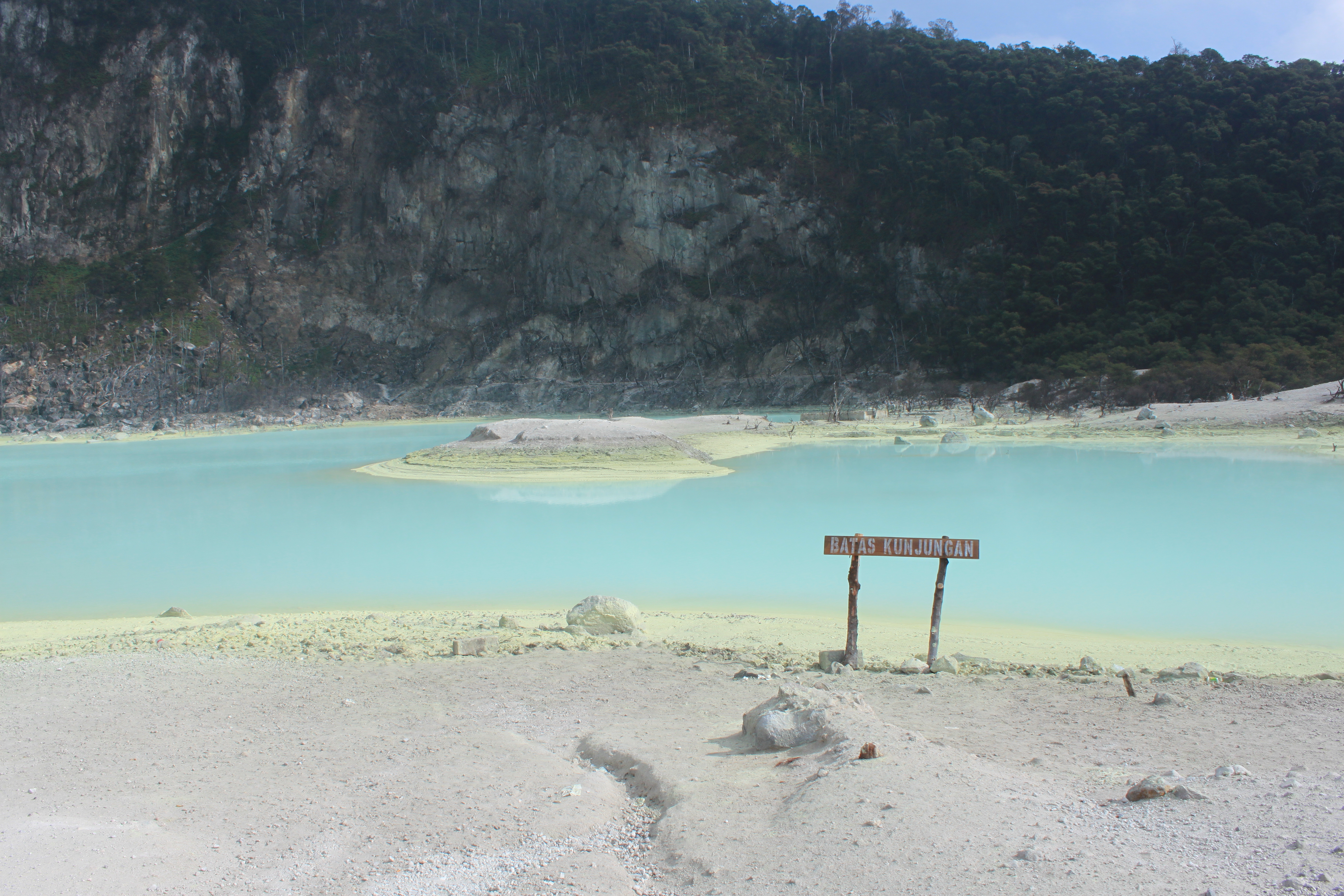
- Kawah Putih

- Coat of arms
- Motto: Repeh Rapih Kerta Raharja ᮛᮦᮕᮦᮂ ᮛᮕᮤᮂ ᮊᮨᮁᮒ ᮛᮠᮁᮏ; Convenient, harmonious, fruitful, affluent
- Location within West Java
- Interactive map of Bandung Regency
- Location in Java and Indonesia Bandung Regency (Indonesia)
- Coordinates: 7.0222°S 107.5315°E
- Country: Indonesia
- Province: West Java
- Established: 20 April 1641
- Regency seat: Soreang

Government
  - Regent: Dadang Supriatna
  - Vice Regent: Ali Syakieb

Area
  - Total: 1,740.74 km^{2} (672.10 sq mi)
- Elevation: 800 m (2,600 ft)

Population (mid 2025 estimate)
  - Total: 3,873,653
  - Density: 2,225.29/km^{2} (5,763.48/sq mi)
- Time zone: UTC+7 (IWST)
- Area code: (+62) 22
- Website: bandungkab.go.id

Bandung Regency (Indonesian: Kabupaten Bandung, Indonesian pronunciation: [kabuˌpat̪ɛn ˈbandʊŋ]; Sundanese: Kabupatén Bandung) is an administrative landlocked regency located to the south, southeast, east and northeast of the city of Bandung. The northern parts of the Bandung Regency are effectively part of Greater Bandung (technically the whole of the Regency is within the Bandung Metropolitan Area), with the southern third being less urbanized and jutting upwards from the Valley, though not as sharply as the mountain range to the immediate north of Bandung. The Regency is part of the Indonesian province of West Java, and is situated about 75 miles southeast of Jakarta. The town of Soreang is the regency seat.

The Regency was reduced in size as first Cimahi City (which became an independent city on 21 June 2001) and then West Bandung Regency (on 2 January 2007) were split off from the regency, resulting in a land area of 1,740.74 km^{2}. In the 2010 Census, the population of this residual area reached 3,178,543 after final adjustments, while the 2020 Census increased the total to 3,623,790; the official estimate as of mid 2025 was 3,873,653, for an average density of roughly 2,225 per square kilometre. It is the second most populous (after Bogor Regency) of all the regencies of Indonesia.

== Administration ==
Bandung Regency's current regent is Dadang Supriatna, while Sahrul Gunawan is the vice regent.

== Administrative districts ==
Bandung Regency is divided into thirty-one districts (kecamatan), encompassing 280 administrative villages (desa and kelurahan). The districts are listed below with their areas and their populations at the 2010 Census and 2020 Census, together with the official estimates as of mid 2025. For ease of reference, they are grouped below into five geographical sectors (without any administrative significance). The districts each have the same name as the town that is its administrative centre. The table also includes the locations of the district administrative centres, the number of administrative villages in each district (totaling 270 rural desa and 10 urban kelurahan), and its post code.

Kode Wilayah	Name of District {kecamatan)	Area in km^{2}	Pop'n 2010 Census	Pop'n 2020 Census	Pop'n mid 2025 Estimate	Admin centre	No. of villages	Post code
32.04.39	Ciwidey	52.19	72,450	86,445	93,925	Lebakmuncang	7	40973
32.04.40	Rancabali	154.53	47,351	51,096	54,584	Patengan	5	40974
32.04.38	Pasirjambu	201.19	79,333	91,191	99,395	Pasirjambu	10	40972
32.04.17	Cimaung	59.74	72,308	86,075	96,258	Cipinang	10	40374 - 40375
32.04.15	Pangalengan	216.70	138,268	154,286	169,257	Pangalengan	13	40378
32.04.31	Kertasari	136.23	65,276	71,255	76,491	Cibeureum	8	40386
32.04.30	Pacet	95.70	100,246	115,066	132,162	Cikitu	13	40385
Sub-totals	Southern group	916.28	575,232	655,414	722,072		66	
32.04.36	Ibun	55.41	75,048	87,020	97,060	Ibun	12	40384
32.04.35	Paseh	47.95	118,324	136,202	148,736	Tangsimekar	12	40383
32.04.27	Cikancung	39.18	81,160	96,710	107,672	Cikancung	9	40396
32.04.25	Cicalengka	42.21	108,049	122,162	132,543	Cicalengka Kulon	12	40395
32.04.26	Nagreg	42.42	48,704	58,404	63,236	Ganjarsabar	8	40215
32.04.28	Rancaekek	45.11	164,633	185,499	192,921	Rancaekek Wetan	^{(a)} 14	40394
Sub-totals	Eastern group	272.28	595,918	685,997	742,168		67	
32.04.33	Majalaya	24.14	150,342	160,617	171,781	Majasetra	11	40382
32.04.34	Solokan Jeruk	24.40	76,890	86,786	94,128	Jeruk	7	40375
32.04.29	Ciparay	55.02	149,572	172,589	187,055	Pakutandang	14	40381
32.04.32	Baleendah	40.70	220,762	263,724	280,359	Baleendah	^{(b)} 8	40375 ^{(c)}
32.04.16	Arjasari	63.36	90,162	105,593	118,761	Patrolsari	11	40379
Sub-totals	Central group	207.62	687,728	789,309	852,084		51	
32.04.13	Banjaran	35.63	113,280	132,184	143,325	Banjaran	11	40377
32.04.44	Cangkuang	23.66	63,747	79,665	87,831	Ciluncat	7	40238
32.04.14	Pameungpeuk	14.37	68,755	84,557	96,792	Sukasari	6	40976
32.04.11	Katapang	16.25	107,679	130,417	140,044	Sangkanhurip	7	40921
32.04.37	Soreang	25.05	103,054	116,651	124,049	Soreang	10	40911 - 40915
32.04.46	Kutawaringin	47.75	88,359	102,455	113,933	Jatisari	11	40911
Sub-totals	Western group	162.71	544,874	645,929	705,974		52	
32.04.10	Margaasih	18.16	132,280	148,544	155,740	Margaasih	6	40214 - 40218
32.04.09	Margahayu	10.65	119,742	121,608	121,324	Sukamenak	^{(d)} 5	40225 - 40229
32.04.12	Dayeuhkolot	11.28	112,790	107,186	106,900	Citeureup	^{(e)} 6	40238 - 90267
32.04.08	Bojongsoang	28.32	101,628	112,671	113,191	Bojongsoang	6	40287 - 40288
32.04.05	Cileunyi	30.67	159,764	186,543	184,397	Cileunyi	6	40621 - 40626
32.04.07	Cilengkrang	35.11	45,843	56,018	55,821	Jatiendah	6	40615 - 40619
32.04.06	Cimenyan	47.68	102,714	114,567	113,982	Cimenyan	^{(f)} 9	40191 - 40198
Sub-totals	Northern group	181.87	774,791	847,137	851,355		44	
	Totals	1,740.74	3,178,543	3,623,790	3,873,653	Soreang	280	

The Northern group of Margaasih, Margahayu, Dayeuhkolot and Bojongsoang Districts (which lie immediately to the south of the city), and Cileunyi, Cilengkrang and Cimenyan Districts
(which lie immediately to the east and north of the city) are virtually extensions to the built-up area of Bandung. These suburbs are no longer increasing in population, as growth has switched to the groups of districts further south.

Notes: (a) including the urban kelurahan of Rancaekek Kencana.
(b) comprising five kelurahan (Andir, Baleendah, Jelekong, Manggahang and Wargamekar) and three desa.
(c) except Malakasari desa, which has a post code of 40258. (d) including the kelurahan of Sulaeman.
(e) including the kelurahan of Pasawahan. (f) including the two kelurahan of Cibeunying and Padasuka.

== Neighbouring administrations ==
Bandung Regency is bordered by:

- North = West Bandung Regency, Cimahi city, Bandung city, Subang Regency, Sumedang Regency.
- East = Sumedang Regency, Garut Regency.
- South = Garut Regency, Cianjur Regency.
- West = Cianjur Regency, West Bandung Regency.

== Nature reserves ==
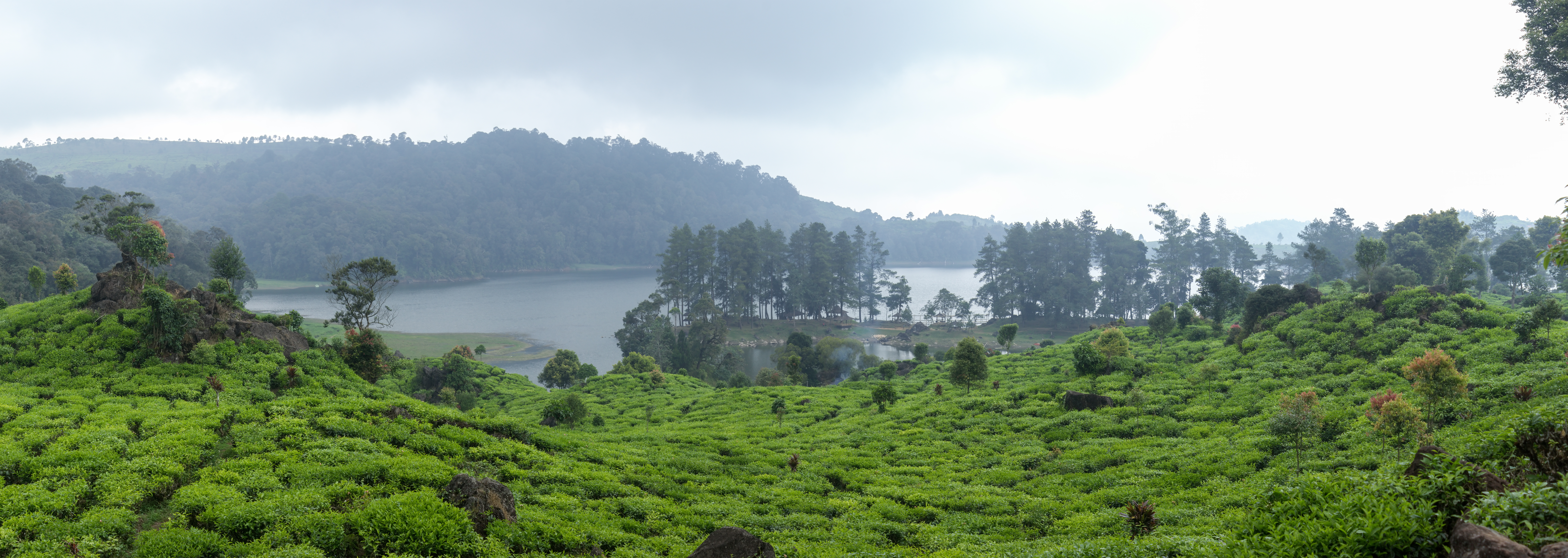
Patenggang Lake is a popular tourist attraction in Bandung Regency

- Mount Tilu (Nature Reserve) in Pangalengan and Pasirjambu.
- Patengan (Nature Reserve) in Rancabali.
- Malabar (Nature Reserve) in Pangalengan.
- Mount Patuha (Nature Reserve) in Rancabali and Pasirjambu with the Kawah Putih tourist site.
- Situ Cisanti (Nature Reserve) in Kertasari

== Mountains and volcanoes ==
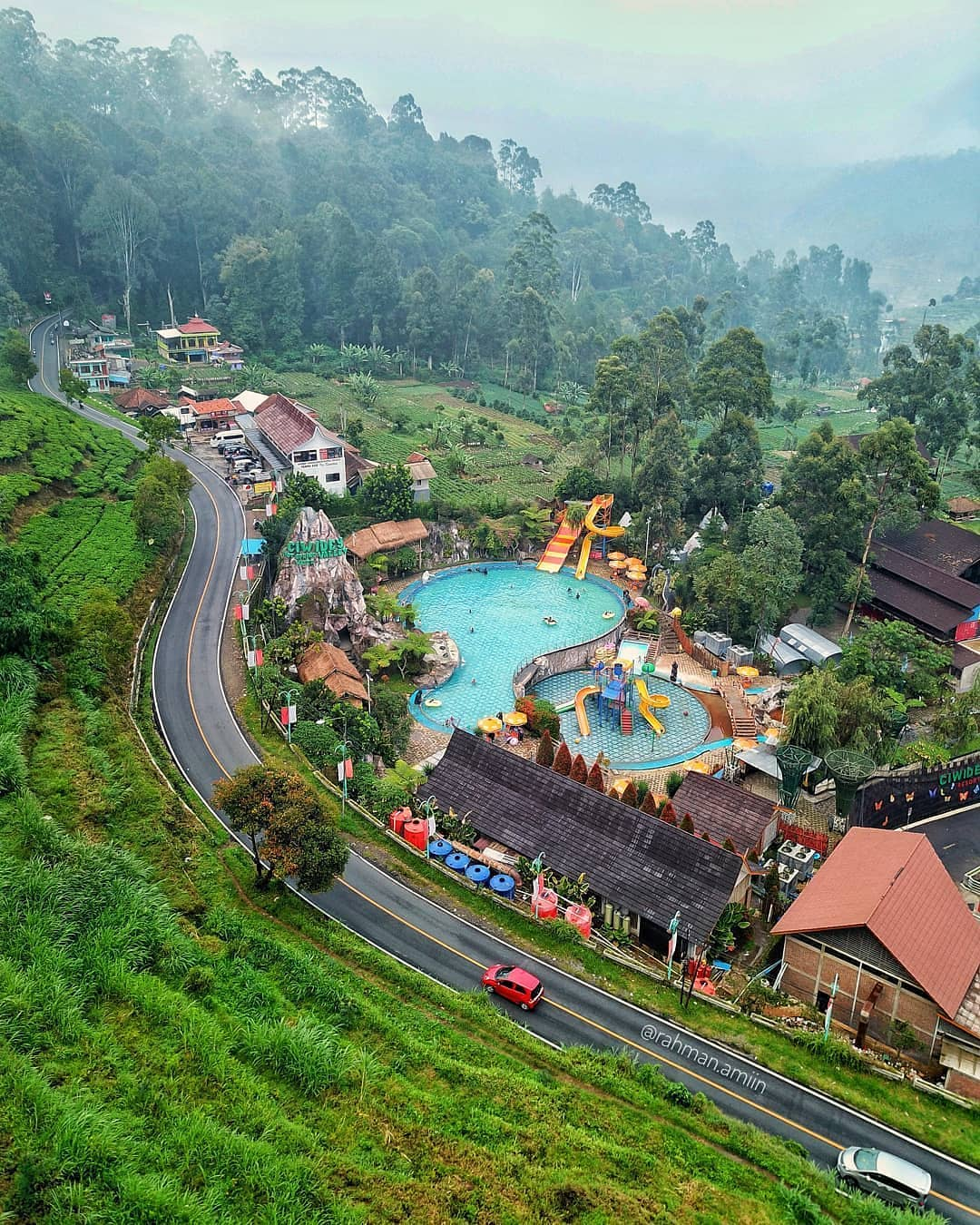
Ciwidey

- Mount Tilu in Pangalengan.
- Mount Waringin in Pasirjambu and Pangalengan.
- Malabar Mountain, Besar Peak in Pangalengan, Puntang Peak in Cimaung, Haruman Peak in Pangalengan and Cimaung, Malabar Peak in Pacet, and also several peaks in Pangalengan, Cimaung, Banjaran, and Pacet.
- Mount Riung Gunung in Pangalengan.
- Mount Maud in Pasirjambu.
- Mount Kendang in Kertasari.
- Mount Bedil in Pangalengan.
- Mount Kencana in Pangalengan.
- Mount Mandalawangi in Rancabali and Ciwidey.
- Mount Kendeng, stratovolcano west of Rancabali and east of Sukanagara [id] in Cianjur Regency
- Mount Patuha volcano in Rancabali and Pasirjambu with Kawah Putih crater nearby.
- Wayang volcano in Pangalengan and Kertasari.
- Windu volcano in Pangalengan.
- Manglayang volcano in Cimenyan and Cikacung.
- Kawah Ciwidey volcano in Pasirjambu.
- Papandayan volcano in Kertasari.
- Kamojang volcano in Ibun.

Because of the mountainous nature of parts of the Bandung Regency, major landslides are a significant natural hazard for the people of the area. In February 2010, for example, over 15 people were killed in a large landslide in the Ciwidey area.

== Industry ==
Various local manufacturing activities take place in the Regency including the following.

- KPBS, Koperasi Peternakan Bandung Selatan (milk producer) (Pangalengan)
- Asia Sport (Apparel) (Katapang)
- Ceres (Chocolate) (Dayeuhkolot)
- PanAsia Indosyntec (Textiles) (Dayeuhkolot)
- Polyfin (Cileunyi)
- PT Mitra Rajawali Banjaran (Condoms) (Banjaran) received the 2010 ASEAN Business Development Award for best quality. The factory produces around 18.7 million condoms a year, 65 percent of which are for export

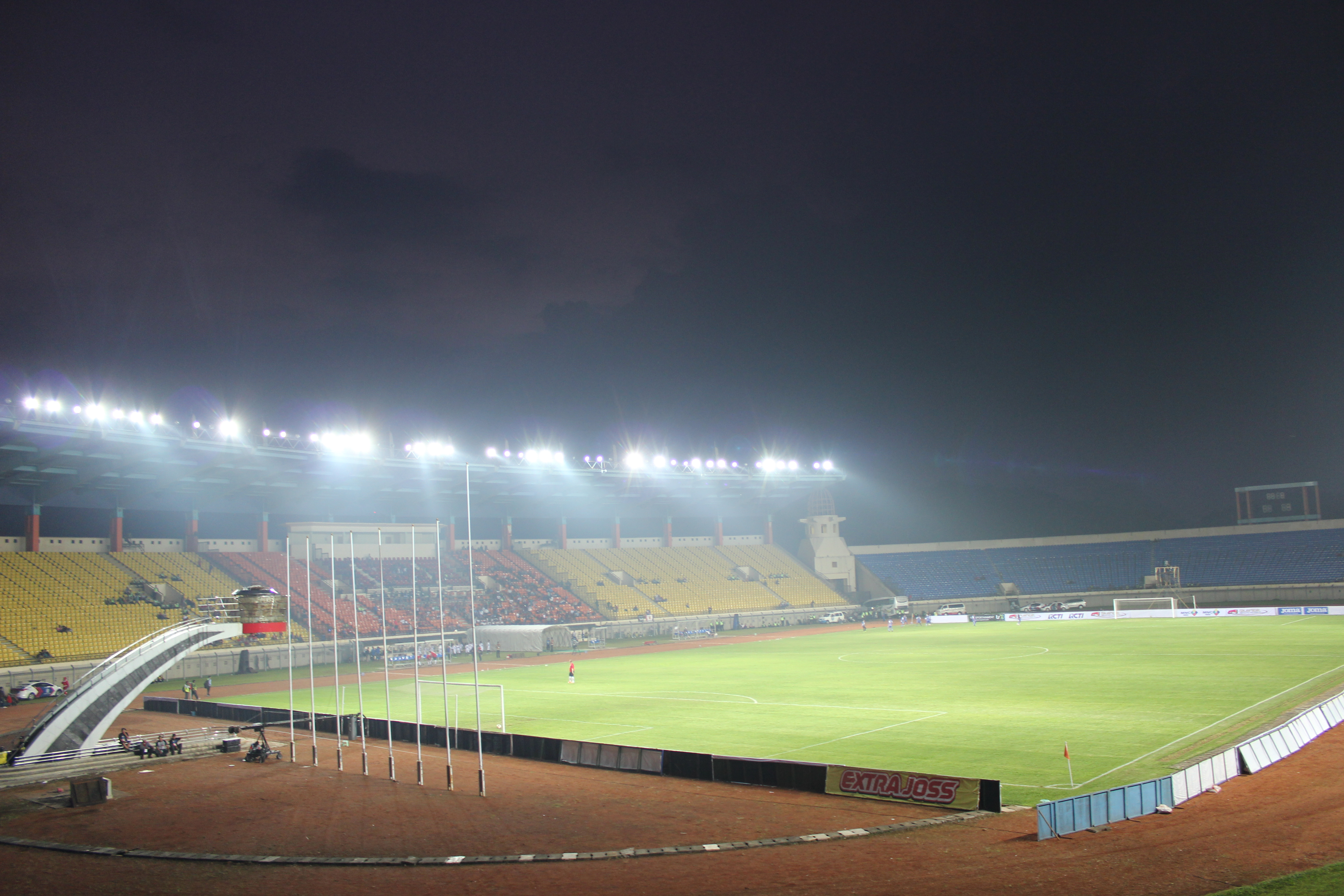
Jalak Harupat Stadium

== Cuisine ==
This area has a unique cuisine, such as Milk Caramels (in Pangalengan), Fresh Milk (in Pangalengan), Milk Snack (in Pangalengan), Bandrek (in Ciwidey), Borondong (in Majalaya)

== Transport ==
Transport to the Bandung Regency mainly is from Bandung. No major bus terminals, train stations or airports are located in the region. Traditional transport arrangements such as the Delman horse passenger carriages are found in such places as the Banjaran District.

=== Nagreg Ring Road ===
To ease traffic jams in the Nagreg hill area close to Bandung, in 2011 the government completed part of the Nagreg ring road (5.4 km in length, 10 degrees in steepness, with a 400 metres semi-tunnel) at a cost of Rp.90 billion (around $US 10.6 million). The ring road will serve vehicles from travelling from south to north and can be used during Eid ul-Fitr 2011. Traffic from north to south will still use the old road.

== See also ==
- List of regencies and cities of Indonesia
