= Malabar =

Malabar may refer to:

== People ==
- Malabars, people originating from the Malabar region of India
- Malbars or Malabars, people of Tamil origin in Réunion

== Places ==
- Malabar Coast, or Malabar, a region of the southwestern shoreline of India
  - Dutch Malabar (1661–1795)
  - Malabar District (1792–1957)
  - Malabar rainforests, ecoregions
- Malabar, Indonesia
  - Malabar Radio Station
- Mount Malabar, a volcano in Indonesia
- Malabar, Florida, US
- Malabar Island, part of the Aldabra Atoll, Seychelles
- Malabar Settlement, Trinidad and Tobago
- 754 Malabar, a minor planet
- Malabar, New South Wales, Australia
  - Malabar Headland

== Transportation and military ==
- Malabar Express, a train service in India
- Malabar (train), a train service in Indonesia
- List of ships named Malabar
- HMS Malabar, the name of several ships and a shore establishment of the Royal Navy
- SS Malabar, the name of a number of steamships
- USS Malabar (AF-37), a US Navy World War II stores ship
- Malabar (naval exercise), a multilateral naval exercise

== Other uses ==
- Malabar (chewing gum), a French brand of chewing gum
- Malabar (typeface), a serif font family
- Malabar, a fictional horse in "The Rocking-Horse Winner" by D. H. Lawrence, 1926
- Malabar United F.C., an Indian football club
- Malabar front, a front line in a war in George Orwell's book Nineteen Eighty-Four

== See also ==
- Malaba (disambiguation)
- Syro-Malabar (disambiguation)
- Malankara (disambiguation)
- Malaya (disambiguation)
- Malai (disambiguation)
- Behramji Malabari (1853–1912), Indian poet, publicist, author, and social reformer
- Pterocarpus marsupium, or Malabar kinoa deciduous tree
- Pachira aquatica, or Malabar chestnut, a tropical wetland tree
- Malabar grey hornbill, a bird
- Malabar tree toad, a toad
- Idea malabarica, or Malabar tree nymph, a butterfly
