= Venkata =

Venkata or Venkat may refer to:

- Venkata (hill) or Venkatadri, one of the seven sacred peaks of Tirumala hill in Andhra Pradesh, India
- Venkateswara ("the Lord of Venkata"), a form of the Hindu god Vishnu

== Places in India ==
- Venkatagiri, Nellore district, Andhra Pradesh
- Venkatapuram, Khammam, a mandal in Khammam district, Telangana
- Venkatapuram, Krishna, a village in Krishna district, Andhra Pradesh
- Venkatapuram, Kurnool, a village in Kurnool district, Andhra Pradesh

== People ==
- Venkata I (died 1542), king of the Vijayanagara Empire, South India
- Venkata II (reign 1585–1614 CE), king of the Vijayanagara Empire, South India
- Venkata III (reign 1632–1642), king of the Vijayanagara Empire, South India
- Venkat (actor), Telugu actor
- C. V. Raman (1888–1970), Indian physicist, 1930 Nobel Prize for Physics
- P. A. Venkatachalam, Indian biomedical engineer
- R. R. Venkat (fl. 2004–2013), Indian film producer
- C. S. Venkatakrishnan, American banker, CEO of Barclays
- Srinivasaraghavan Venkataraghavan (born 1945), Indian cricketer
- T. N. Venkataramana (born 1958), Indian mathematician
- Suresh Venkatasubramanian, Indian-American computer scientist
- Pamulaparthi Venkata Narasimha Rao (1921–2004), Indian prime minister from 1991 to 1996

== See also ==
- Tirumalai (disambiguation)
- Venkatesh, given name and family name
- Venkatachalam (disambiguation)
- Venkataraghavan (disambiguation)
- Venkataraman (disambiguation)
- Venkata Rao (disambiguation), multiple people
