= Venkatapuram =

Venkatapuram may refer to:

== Places in India ==
- Venkatapuram, Hyderabad, Telangana
- Venkatapuram, Jayashankar Bhupalpally district, Andhra Pradesh
- Venkatapuram, Krishna district, Andhra Pradesh
- Venkatapuram, Kurnool district, Andhra Pradesh
- Venkatapuram, Prakasam district, Andhra Pradesh

== Arts and entertainment ==
- Venkatapuram (film), 2017 Indian Telugu-language film
