= Sukadiah Pringgohardjoso =

Indonesian diplomat (1926–2024)

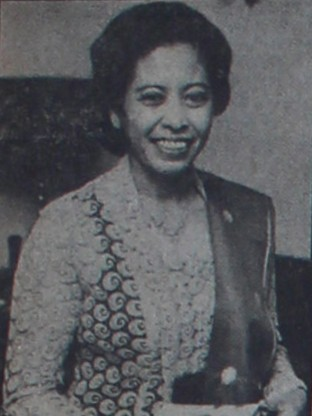

Ambassador of Indonesia to Denmark
- In office 11 April 1981 – 26 September 1984
- President: Suharto
- Preceded by: Sudarno Martonagoro
- Succeeded by: Sutadi Sukarya

Personal details
- Born: August 1, 1926 Yogyakarta, Dutch East Indies
- Died: May 21, 2024 (aged 97) South Jakarta, Jakarta, Indonesia
- Education: Gadjah Mada University (Drs.)

Sukadiah Pringgohardjoso (1 August 1926 – 21 May 2024) was an Indonesian career diplomat who was the ambassador to Denmark from 1981 to 1984. He was notable for being the first woman to be appointed as ambassador by president Suharto and the third woman overall in the country's history, after Laili Roesad to Belgium and Artati Marzuki-Sudirdjo to Switzerland.

== Early life ==
Sukadiah was born on 1 August 1926 in Yogyakarta as the daughter of Pringgohardjoso, a civil servant in the Yogyakarta Sultanate, and Siti Widyawati, a woman rights activist who is a member of the Wanita Oetomo, a socio-cultural organization in Yogyakarta and Central Java that provided femininity education to girls in the region. Sukadiah's mother forced her to study languages and wear striped woven shirt in light of the-then ongoing self reliance movement.

== Diplomatic career ==
Sukadiah began his career as a civil servant at the defence ministry during the Indonesian National Revolution. After the end of the war, she joined the foreign ministry and was directed to study international relations at the Gadjah Mada University. She received her doctorandus upon completing the final examination on 16 January 1956. She was then appointed as a subsection chief within the Asia Pacific directorate of the foreign ministry, serving from 1956 to 1959.

In 1959, Sukadiah was sent overseas as a junior diplomat in charge of economic affairs at the embassy in London. She was accorded the diplomatic rank of second secretary, and served for a three-year stint until 1962. Afterwards, she returned to the foreign ministry as the chief of passports within the consular section until 1965. She was then transferred to the embassy in Mexico, acting as the principal deputy (second man) to ambassadors Rusman Manhar Djajakusuma and Suryono Darusman between 1968 and 1971. She started off her career with the diplomatic rank of first secretary before being promoted to counsellor. During her assignment there, Sukadiah attended a Spanish language course in 1969.

Sukadiah returned to the foreign ministry as the secretary of the America directorate from 1971 to 1974. At the same time, she became the first cohort of the newly established senior diplomatic school, which she attended between 1973 and 1974. She was then sent to Copenhagen in Denmark to establish Indonesia's embassy in the country, which previously existed as a legation. Gusti Rusli Noor was appointed as the ambassador, while Sukadiah was appointed as his principal deputy with the rank of minister counsellor. Her assignment in Copenhagen concurrently ended with Gusti's ambassadorial term in 1978. She returned to Indonesia with her appointment as the foreign department's director of social cultural in September 1979.

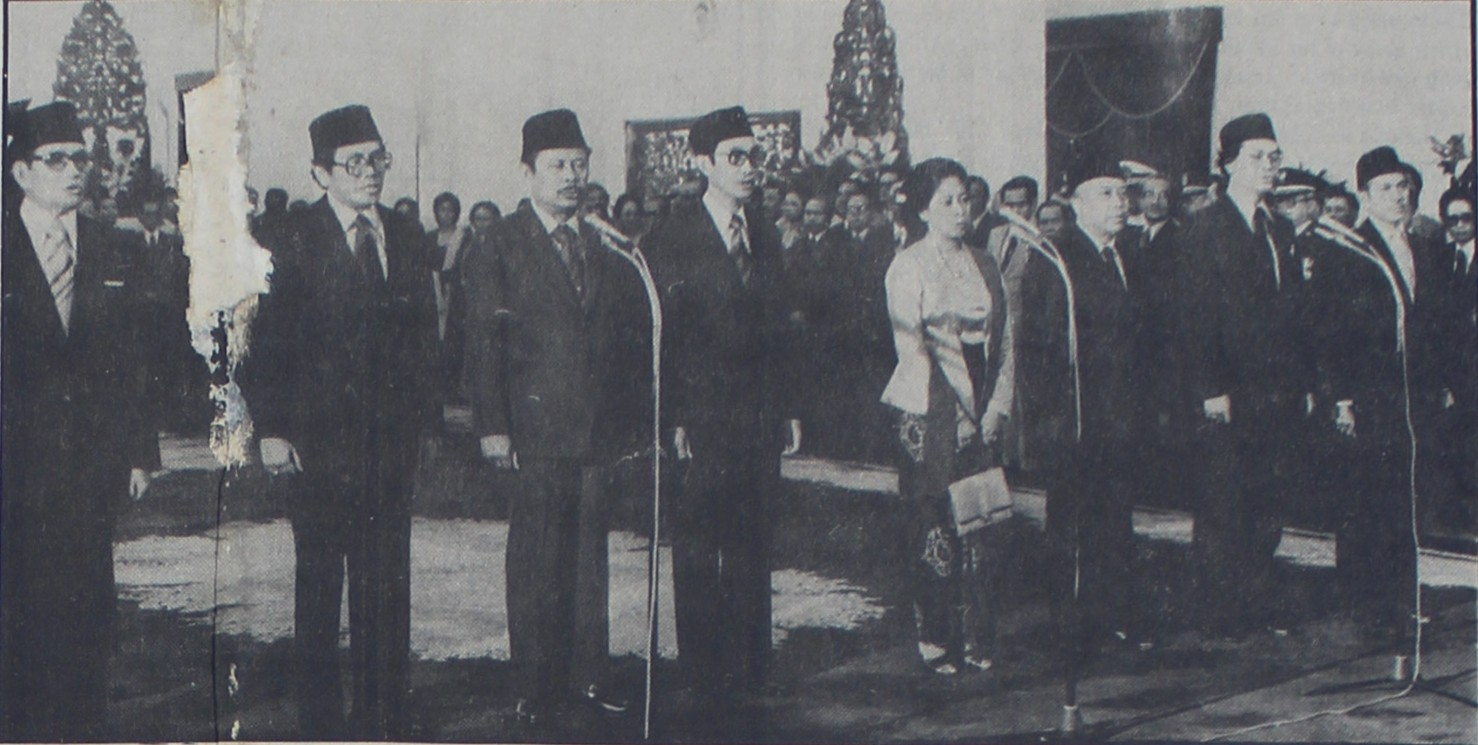
Sukadiah (fourth from right) being sworn in as ambassador to Denmark, 1981.

On 30 March 1981, Sukadiah was approved by the Danish government as Indonesia's ambassador to the country. Her appointment drew media attention as she was the first woman ambassador appointed by president Suharto. In a 2023 interview, Sukadiah indicated the possibility of her being nominated by the-then state protocol chief Joop Ave, who suggested Suharto to appoint a woman ambassador. She was sworn in by president Suharto alongside with several other ambassadors on 11 April 1981. Shortly following her appointment ceremony, Sukadiah emphasized that "there is no difference in pursuing a diplomatic career, either as a man or a woman" and stated that she never felt any difficulties in carrying out her diplomatic assignments. Berita Yudha, the army's newspaper, pointed out that Sukadiah also has a woman, Sukartini Subekti, as her principal deputy at the time of her appointment.

By 1983, she was one of the eight women ambassadors serving in the country. The national news agency Antara remarked that Denmark's foreign minister at that time, Uffe Ellemann-Jensen, was "the luckiest foreign minister in the world". Sukadiah's term ended on 26 September 1984.

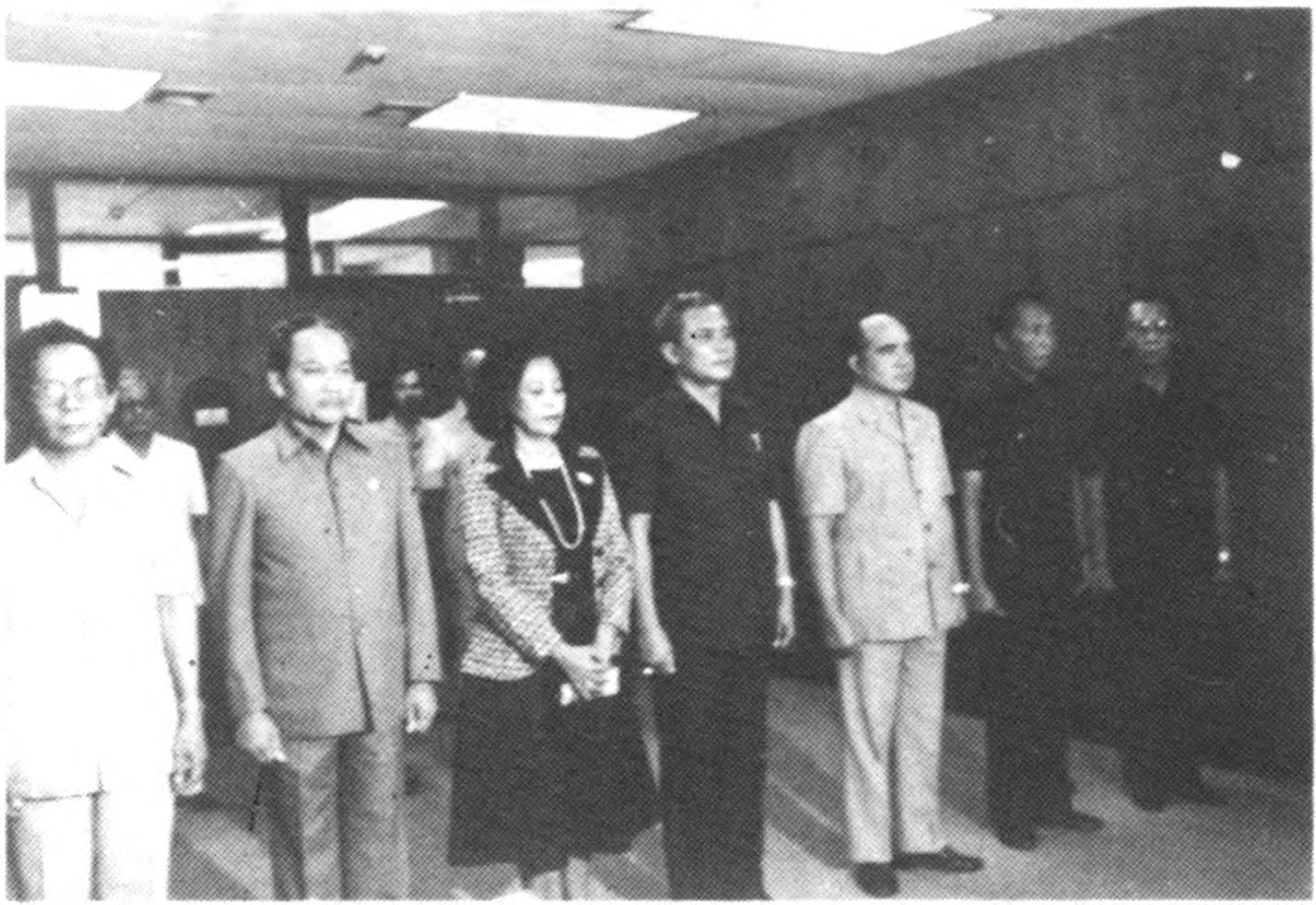
Sukadiah (third from left) being sworn in as a member of the overseas elections committee, 1986.

Following her three-year ambassadorial stint, Sukadiah was appointed as the foreign department's director of consular affairs. In her capacity, she was included as a member in the overseas elections committee for the 1987 Indonesian legislative election. Upon her retirement, Sukadiah resided at the foreign department housing complex and advised the Sosrokartono Social and Cultural Foundation, a foundation established to preserve the heritage of the Javanese prince Sosrokartono. Sukadiah died on 21 May 2024 at her house in South Jakarta and was interred at the Giri Tama Cemetery in Bogor, West Java.

== Personal life ==
Sukadiah was never married. At her inauguration, she sarcastically remarked that she dedicated her entire life for her career.
