= List of ships named Malabar =

Several ships have been named Malabar for the Malabar Coast:

- Malabar (1795 ship) was initially named Nieuwland, launched in 1794 for the Dutch East India Company. The British seized her in 1795 and new owners renamed her Malabar. She made two complete voyages under charter to the British East India Company before she burnt at Madras in 1801 in an accident.
- Malabar (1804 ship) was launched at Shields. In 1819 she transported convicts to Port Jackson, Australia, and then in 1821 she made a voyage transporting convicts to Van Diemen's Land. She is last listed in 1824.
- Malabar (1815 ship) was launched at Boston.
- Malabar (1834 ship), of 60379/94 tons (bm), was one of the first of Wigram & Green's Blackwall frigates, built at their Blackwall Yard. She was launched on 29 April 1834.
- MV Malabar (1925) was launched from west shipbuilding yard of Barclay Curle and Company, in Glasgow Scotland. On 2 April 1931 she ran aground and sunk at Long Bay in heavy fog. Long Bay was renamed to Malabar after her.

== See also ==
- HMS Malabar, several ships and a shore establishment of the Royal Navy
- SS Malabar, the name of a number of steamships
- USS Malabar, a US Navy World War II stores ship
