= Venkatachalam =

Venkatachalam may refer to:

== Places ==
- Venkata (hill) or Venkatachalam, one of the seven sacred peaks of Tirumala hills in Andhra Pradesh, India
- Venkatachalam mandal or Venkatachellum, a village and a Mandal in Nellore district in the state of Andhra Pradesh in India
  - Venkatachalam railway station, located in the Indian state of Andhra Pradesh, serving Venkatachalam in Nellore district
- Venkatachalam Palli (also referred to as Venkatachalampalli), a village in the Darsi Mandal of the Prakasam district located in the southern state of Andhra Pradesh, India
- 16214 Venkatachalam, a minor planet

== Persons ==
- A. Venkatachalam (1955–2010), Indian politician and former MLA from Alangudi, Tamil Nadu, India
- Arivazhagan Venkatachalam, Tamil film director
- G. Venkatachalam, Indian politician and member of the Tamil Nadu Legislative Assembly from the Salem West constituency
- Jothi Venkatachalam (1917-?), Indian politician and a former Governor of Kerala and Member of the Legislative Assembly of Tamil Nadu
- Manjeri Venkatachalam, pathologist
- N. D. Venkatachalam, Indian politician and member of the Tamil Nadu Legislative Assembly from the Perundurai constituency
- P. A. Venkatachalam, Indian academic
- V. Venkatachalam (1925–2002), eminent Sanskrit scholar
- Venkatachalam Ramaswamy, Indian Director of the Geophysical Fluid Dynamics Laboratory of the National Oceanic and Atmospheric Administration (NOAA) Office of Oceanic and Atmospheric Research (OAR)
- Venkatachalapathi Samuldrala, Indian-American priest of the Shiva Hindu Temple in Parma, Ohio; involved in a controversy over the first Hindu opening prayer in the United States House of Representatives

== See also ==
- Venkata (disambiguation)
- Tirumalai (disambiguation)
