= Malaba =

Malaba may refer to:

== Places ==
- Malaba, Cameroon
- Malaba, Kenya
- Malaba, Ngounié, Gabon
- Malaba, Nyanga, Gabon
- Malaba, Uganda

== Other uses ==
- Luke Malaba (born 1951), Zimbabwean judge and the current Chief Justice of Zimbabwe
- Malaba, an unclassified language of South America

== See also ==
- Malabar (disambiguation)
