= 754 Malabar =

Minor planet orbiting the sun

Discovery
- Discovered by: August Kopff
- Discovery site: Heidelberg
- Discovery date: 22 August 1906

Designations
- Pronunciation: /mæləˈbɑːr/
- Named after: Mount Malabar, West Java
- Alternative designations: 1906 UT

Orbital characteristics
- Epoch 31 July 2016 (JD 2457600.5)
- Uncertainty parameter 0
- Observation arc: 114.41 yr (41,787 d)
- Aphelion: 3.1294 AU (468.15 Gm)
- Perihelion: 2.8436 AU (425.40 Gm)
- Semi-major axis: 2.9865 AU (446.77 Gm)
- Eccentricity: 0.047851
- Orbital period (sidereal): 5.16 yr (1,885.1 d)
- Mean anomaly: 326.44°
- Mean motion: 0° 11^{m} 27.492^{s} / day
- Inclination: 24.565°
- Longitude of ascending node: 180.049°
- Argument of perihelion: 302.528°
- Earth MOID: 1.89316 AU (283.213 Gm)
- Jupiter MOID: 1.90731 AU (285.330 Gm)
- T_{Jupiter}: 3.119

Physical characteristics
- Mean radius: 43.81±2.8 km
- Synodic rotation period: 11.740 h (0.4892 d)
- Geometric albedo: 0.0485±0.007
- Spectral type: Ch
- Absolute magnitude (H): 9.19

754 Malabar is a minor planet orbiting the Sun. It was discovered in 1906 by German astronomer August Kopff from Heidelberg, and was named in honor of a Dutch-German solar eclipse expedition to Christmas Island in 1922. Malabar is the name of a city and mountain in Indonesia. This object is orbiting at a distance of 2.99 AU from the Sun with a period of 5.16 years and an eccentricity (ovalness) of 0.048. Its orbital plane is inclined at an angle of 24.6° to the plane of the ecliptic.

Photometric measurements of this asteroid made in 2003 resulted in a light curve showing a rotation period of 11.740±0.005 h and a brightness variation of 0.45±0.03 in magnitude. This is a Ch-class asteroid in the Bus asteroid taxonomy, showing a broad absorption band in its carbonaceous spectrum near a wavelength of 0.7 μm. This feature is interpreted as due to iron-bearing phyllosilicates on the surface. 754 Malabar spans a girth of 102.8 km. Between 2002 and 2022, 754 Malabar has been observed to occult sixteen stars.
