= Venkataraman =

Venkataraman, Venkatraman and Venkitaraman are names of Indian origin, used both as family names and as masculine given names. People with those names include:

Family name

- Aneesh Venkataraman (born 1978), American journalist and political speech writer
- Ashok Venkitaraman (born before 1998), British cancer researcher
- C. S. Venkataraman (1918–94), Indian mathematician
- G. S. Venkataraman (1930–98), Indian botanist and academic administrator
- Ganesh Venkatraman (active from 2008), Indian film actor
- Ganeshan Venkataraman (born 1932), Indian physicist, writer and academic administrator
- Janaki Venkataraman (1921–2010), First Lady of India 1987–92, wife of R. Venkataraman
- Krishnasami Venkataraman (1901–81), Indian chemist
- Padma Venkataraman (born 1942), Indian social activist, daughter of R. Venkataraman and Janaki Venkataraman
- Padma Venkatraman (AKA T. V. Padma, born 1969), Indian author of children's books
- R. Venkataraman (Ramaswamy Venkataraman, 1910–2009), Indian lawyer, independence activist and politician, President of India 1987–92
- R. Venkataraman (Indian cricketer), Indian cricketer (c.1934–2020)
- S. Venkataraman (1903–80), Indian politician
- S. V. Venkatraman (1911–98), Indian film actor, singer, and music director
- T. R. Venkataraman (active 1984), Indian politician
- Trivandrum R. Venkataraman (1938–2010), classical Indian musician and veena player, in the Carnatic tradition

Given name

- Alluri Venkatarama Raju, father of Indian independence activist Alluri Sitarama Raju
- V. Balakrishnan (physicist) (Venkataraman Balakrishnan, born 1943), Indian theoretical physicist
- Venkataraman Iyer (birth name of Ramana Maharshi, 1879–1950), Indian sage and jivanmukta
- V. Krishnamurthy (Venkataraman Krishnamurthy, active 1969–70), Indian civil servant
- V. Raghavan (Venkataraman Raghavan, 1908–79), Sanskrit scholar and musicologist
- Venkatraman Radhakrishnan (1929–2011), Indian space scientist
- Venkatraman Ramakrishnan (born 1952), Indian-born American and British structural biologist, awarded a share of the 2009 Nobel Prize in Chemistry
- S. Ve. Shekher (Sattanathapuram Venkataraman Shekher, born 1950), Tamil playwright and film actor
- Venkataraman Subramanya (born 1936), Indian international cricketer

== See also ==
- 16215 Venkatraman, an asteroid; see List of minor planets: 16001–17000
- Baker–Venkataraman rearrangement, a chemical reaction discovered by and named after Wilson Baker and Krishnasami Venkataraman
- C. V. Raman (Chandrasekhara Venkata Raman, 1888–1970), Indian physicist who was awarded the 1930 Nobel Prize for Physics
- Venkata (disambiguation)
