= Malaba, Gabon =

Malaba, Gabon may refer to:

- Malaba, Ngounié
- Malaba, Nyanga
