= Karel Albert Rudolf Bosscha =

Dutch philanthropist and planter (Indonesia)

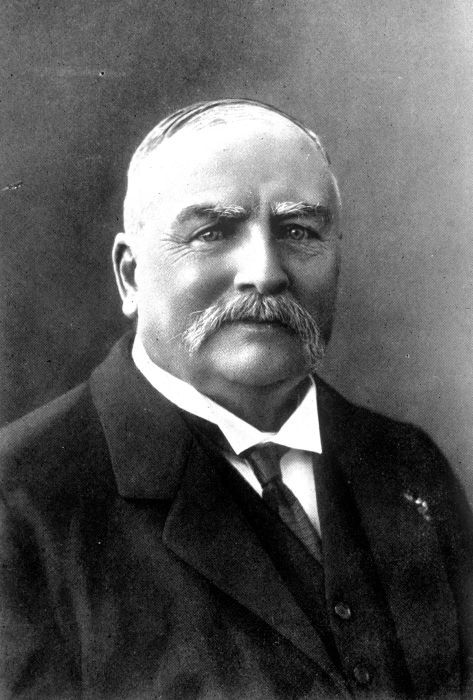
- Born: 15 May 1865; Den Haag, Netherlands
- Died: 26 November 1928 (Age 63); Malabar, Dutch East Indies
- Education: Polytechnical School of Delft
- Occupations: Planter, Philanthropist

Karel Albert Rudolf Bosscha, sometimes known as KAR Bosscha or Ru Bosscha (15 May, 1865 — 26 November, 1928) was a planter, philanthropist and administrator of the Malabar Plantation in Bandung, Indonesia.

== Life and work ==
K.A.R. Bosscha was the son of renowned German-Dutch physicist Johannes Bosscha and Paulina Emilia Kerkhoven. After gaining some formal education in engineering at Polytechnical School of Delft, in 1887 came out to Netherlands Indies and stayed with his uncle while working at Sinagar Estate near Cibadak (West Java) that his uncle owned. Work at his uncle's company gave him little satisfaction, thus after six months he went to Sambas (Borneo) to join his older brother John Bosscha, a geologist. During this time he worked on gold exploration and mining with his brother until his return to Sinager 1892, this time as its administrator. He stayed at Sinagar Estate until 1895 and in 1896 he undertook the management of Malabar Estate near Pangalengan (Bandung) until his death in 1928 because of cancer. As of 2011 the Malabar Estate plantation is still operational under state own company (PT Perkebunan Nusantara) management.

Little was known about his personal life. He never married.

K.A.R. Bosscha spoke Malay and Javanese very well. He was also reported to speak Sundanese fluently.

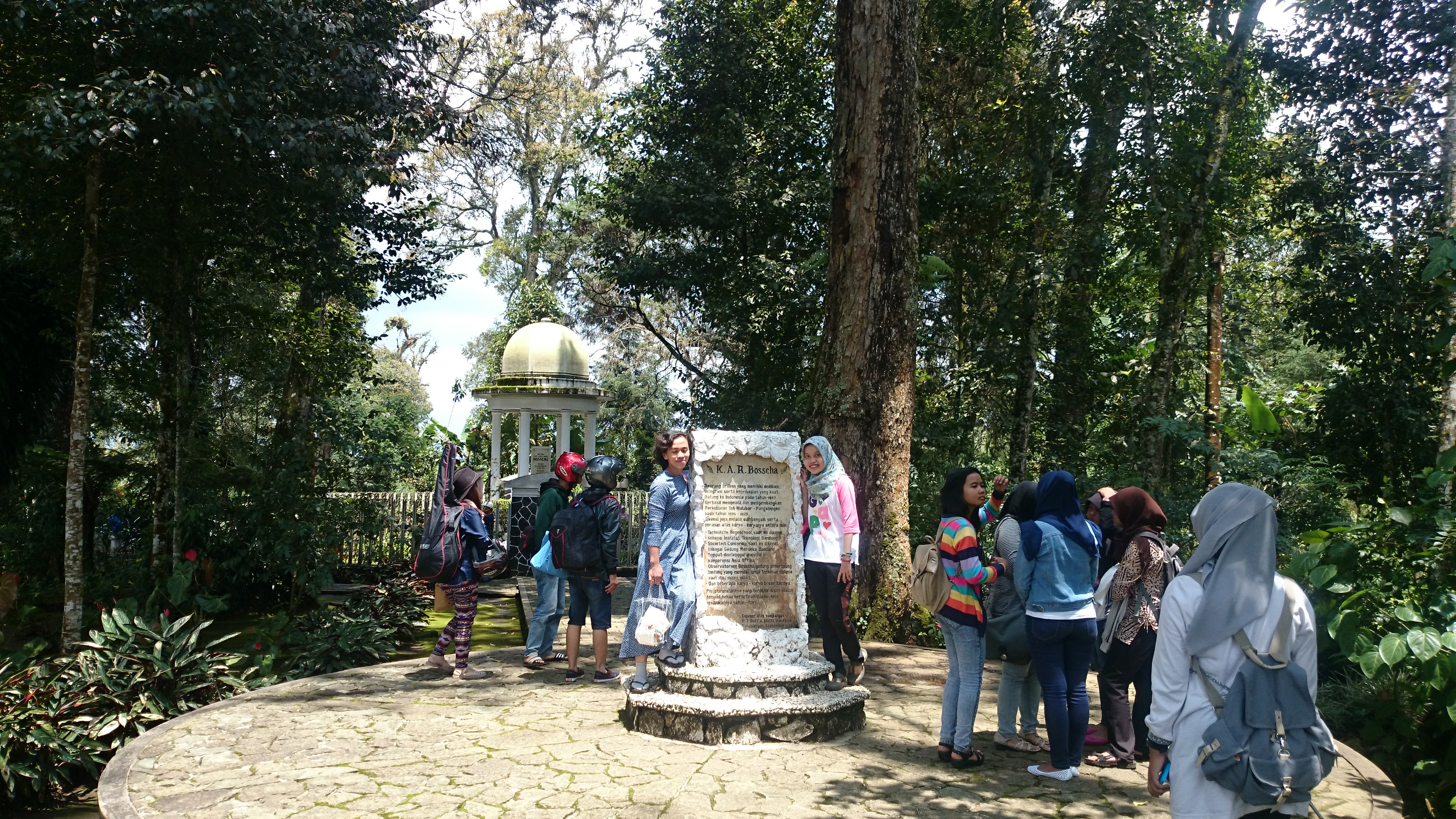
a monument at the entrance

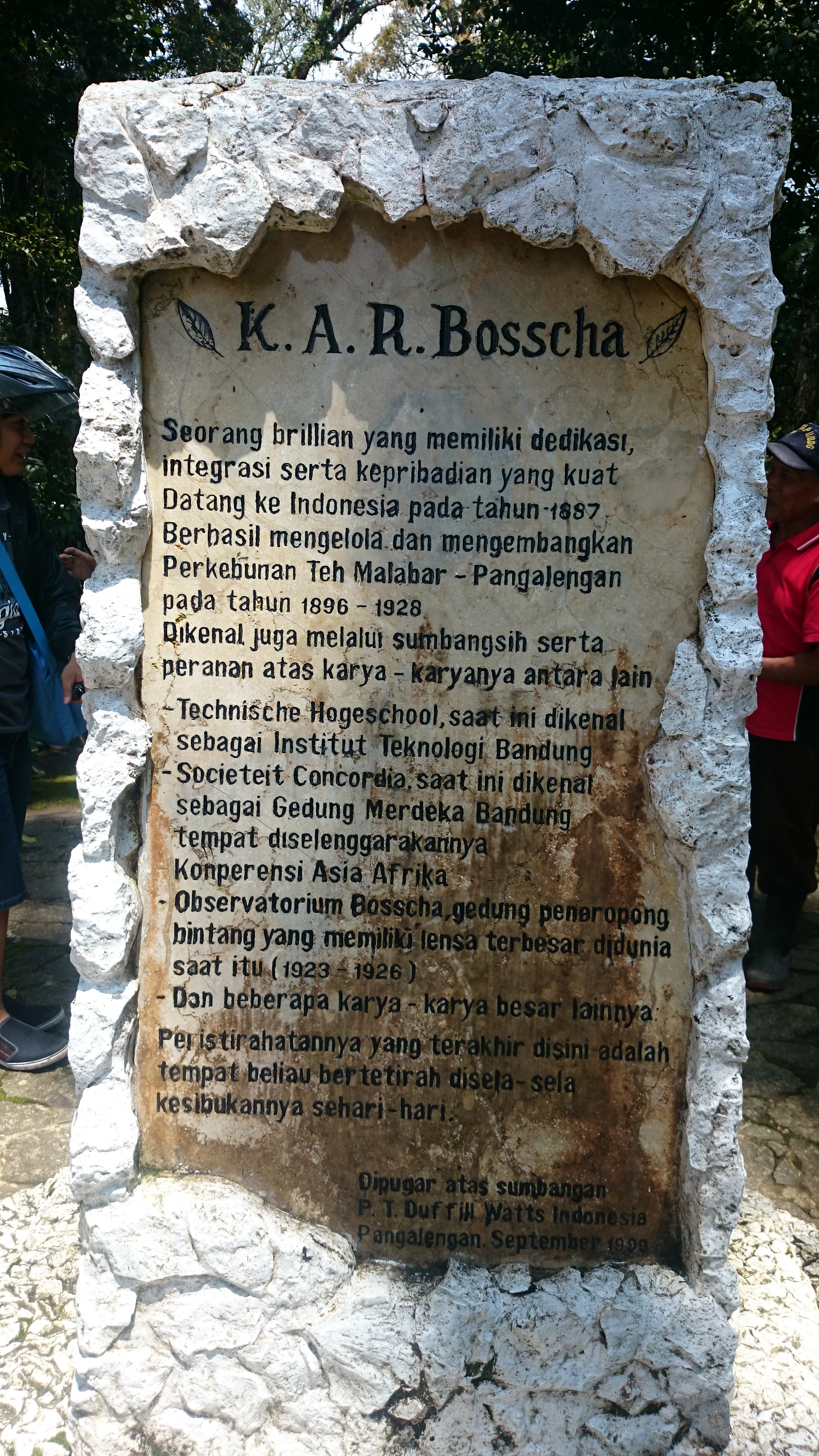
an inscription on the monument

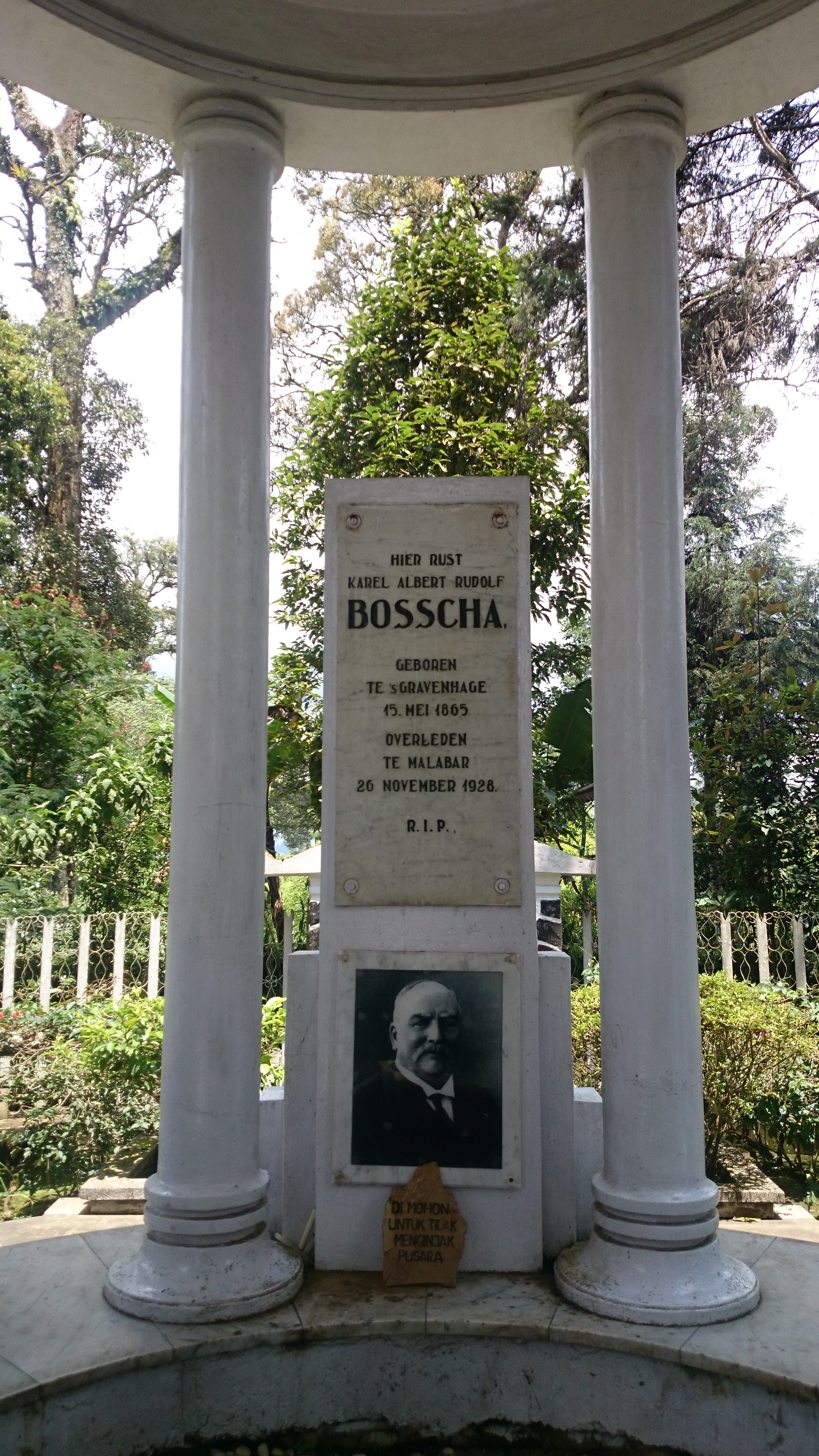
the tomb of K.A.R. Bosscha

== Philanthropy ==
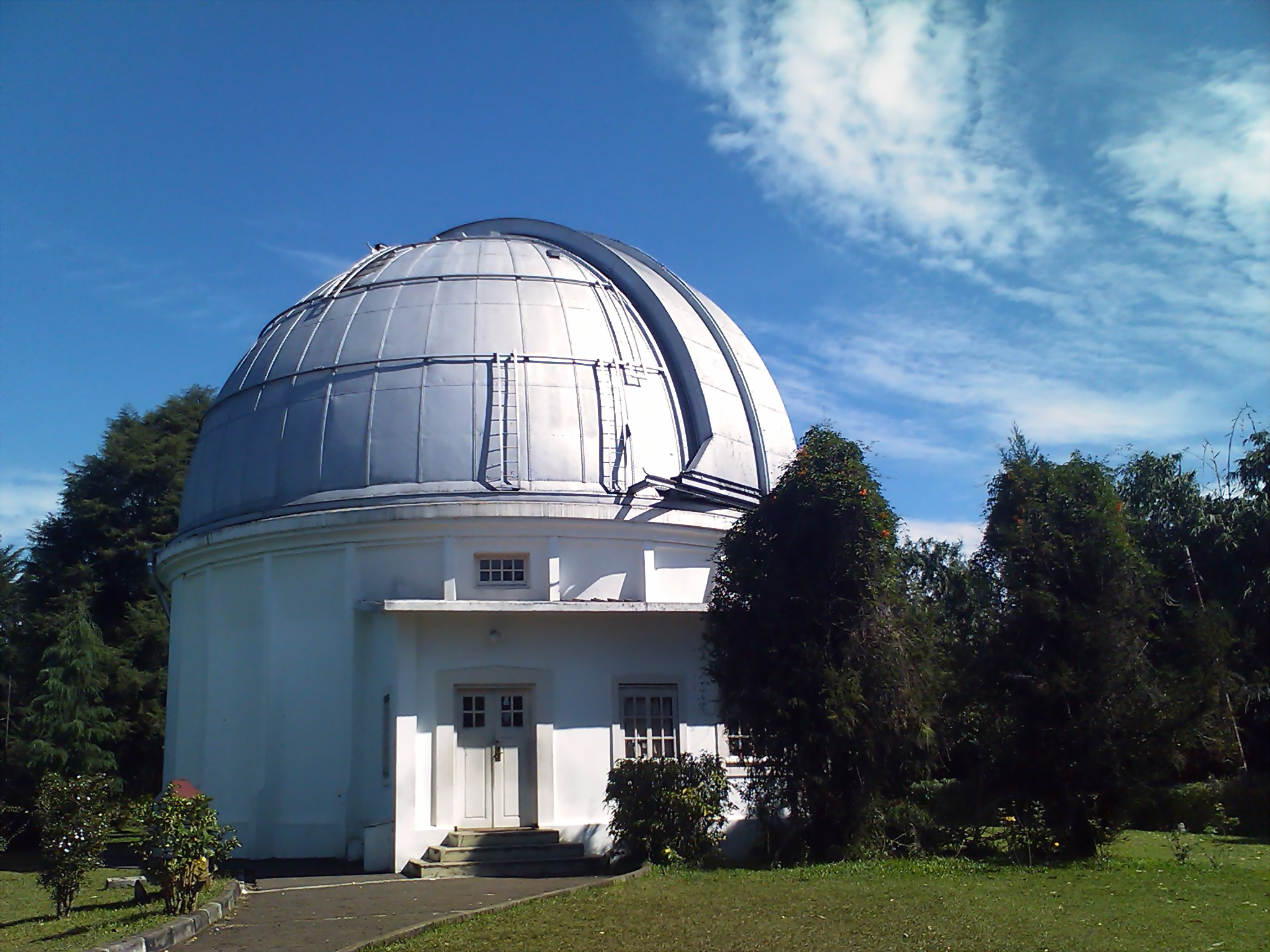
Bosscha Observatory (Lembang)

K.A.R. Bosscha was also a philanthropist and continued his family's traditional interest in science. He most notably participated in the development of the Bosscha Observatory (Bosscha Sterrenwacht) in Lembang near Bandung in 1923. His contribution consists of land that is now used as its location and as the main benefactor until the project's completion five years later (1928). He also sponsored the purchase of the telescope itself from Carl Zeiss of Jena.

Today, the observatory belongs to the Department of Astronomy, Bandung Institute of Technology and it is named "Observatorium Bosscha" (Bosscha Observatory). Indonesian prominent astronomers and physicists have trained there during their early educations.

Bosscha also founded the Cancer Center in Bandung (het Nederlandsch-Indisch Kanker Instituut) and the Technische Hoogeschool te Bandung in 1920 now known as Bandung Institute of Technology. He also created a free-of-charge elementary school for his workers' children in 1901 known as Vervoloog Malabar, now known as Malabar 4'th Public Elementary School (SD Negeri Malabar 04). While the original building partially burnt down, the school now has modern (brick and cement) buildings. The remaining building now serves as a museum. It is made of wood, with bamboo sheet wall.

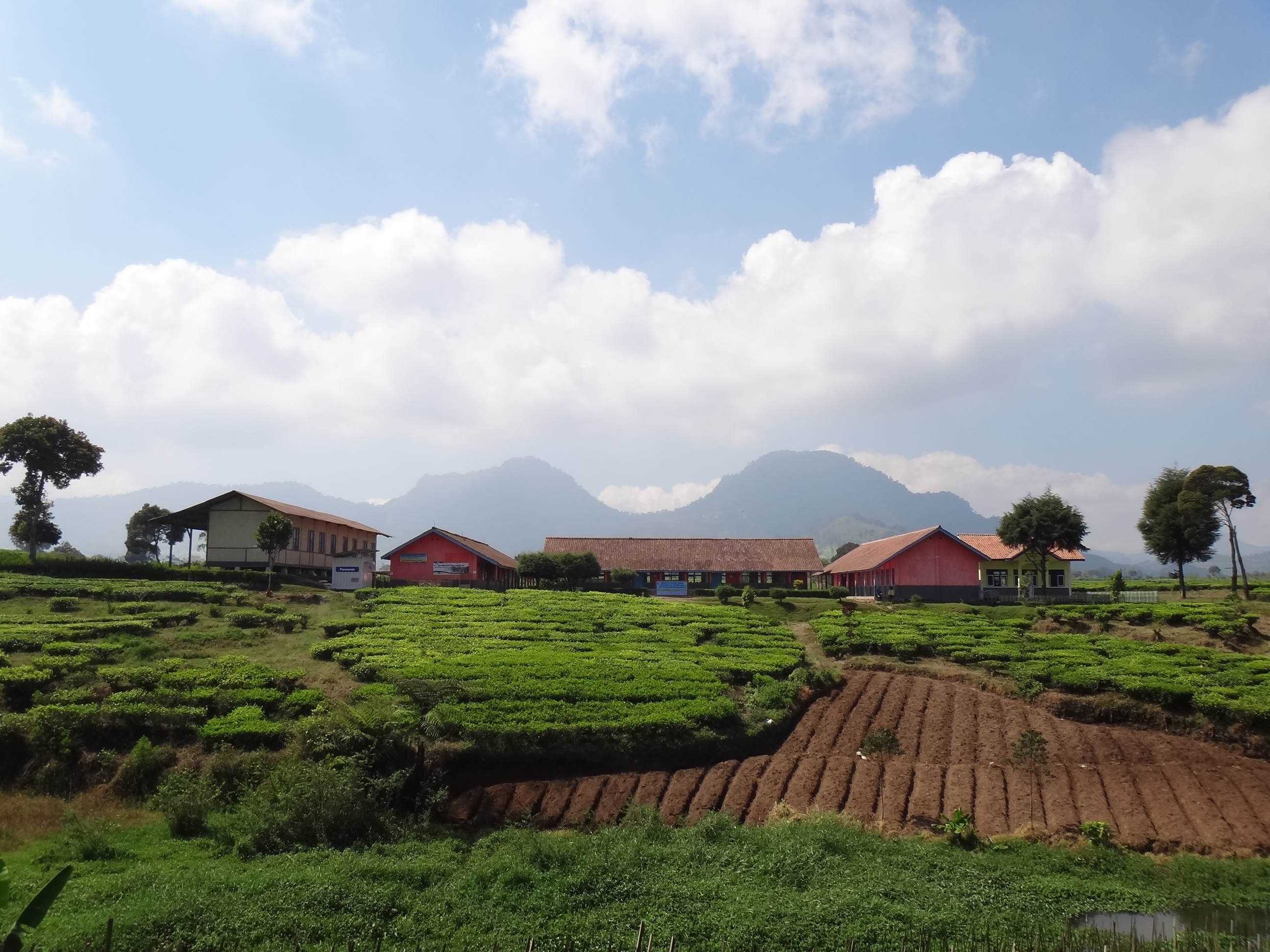
Old building (left), new buildings (middle) and library (right)

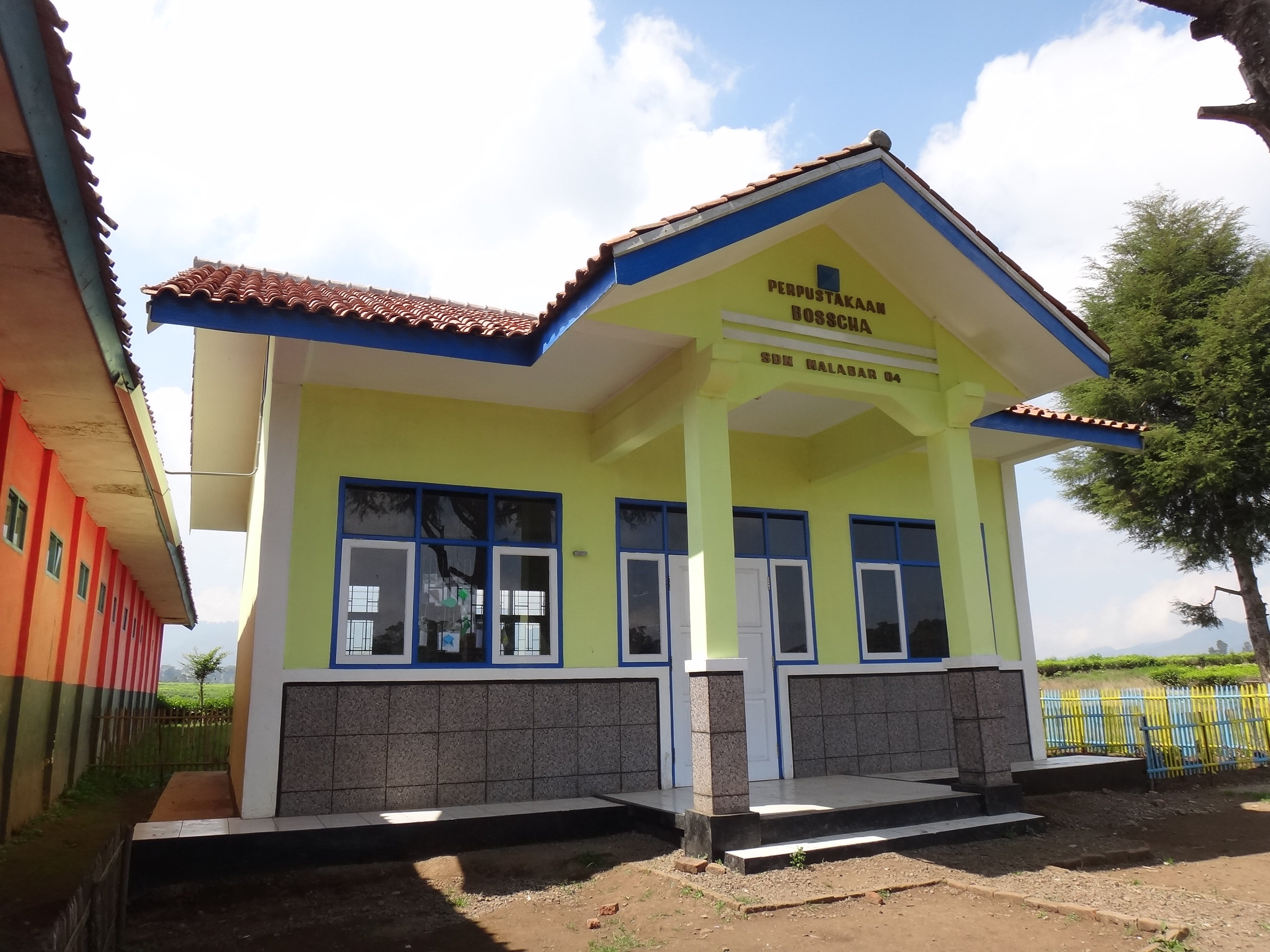
Library of Malabar Public Elementary School

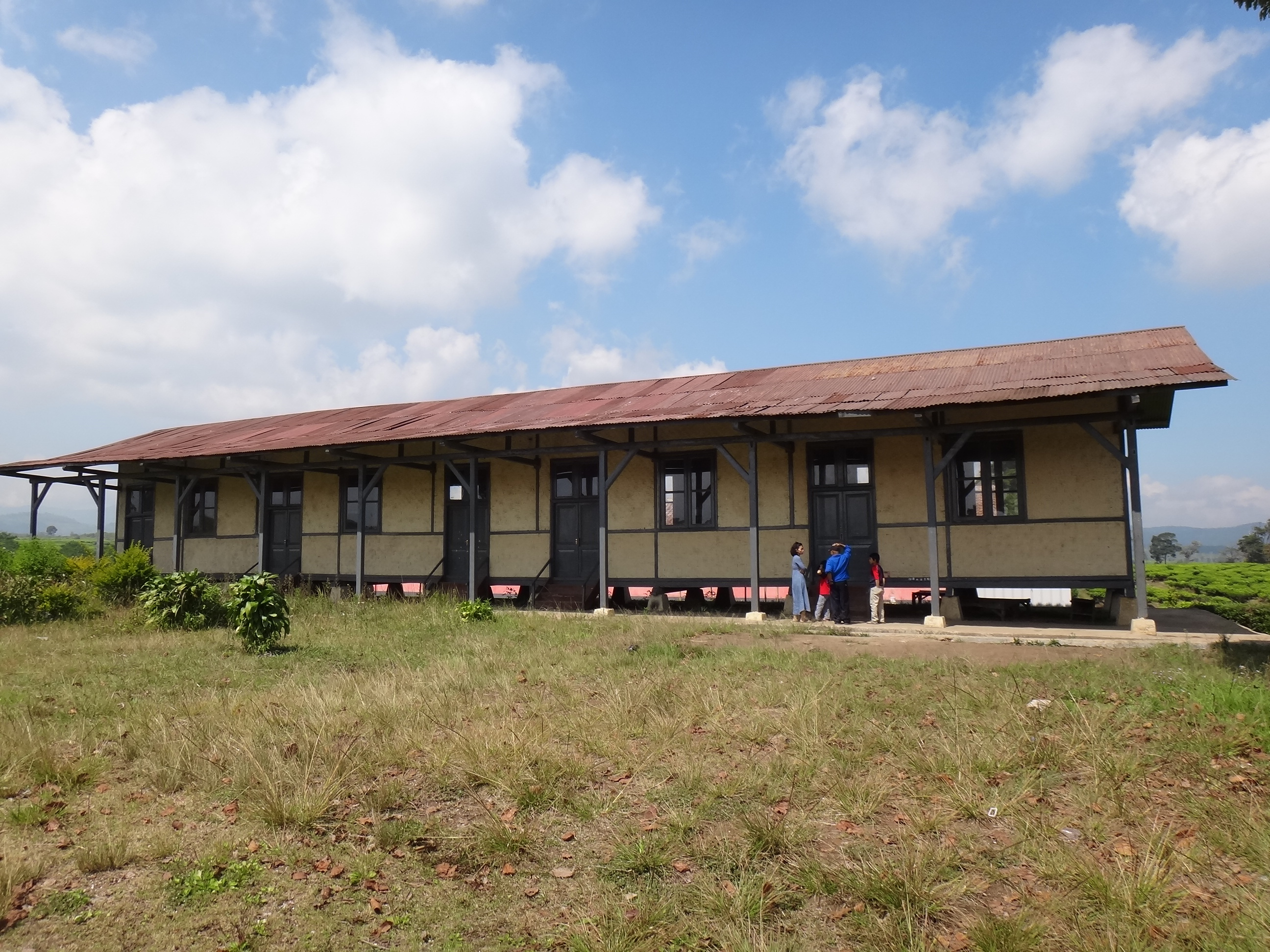
the remaining of the old building of Malabar Elementary School

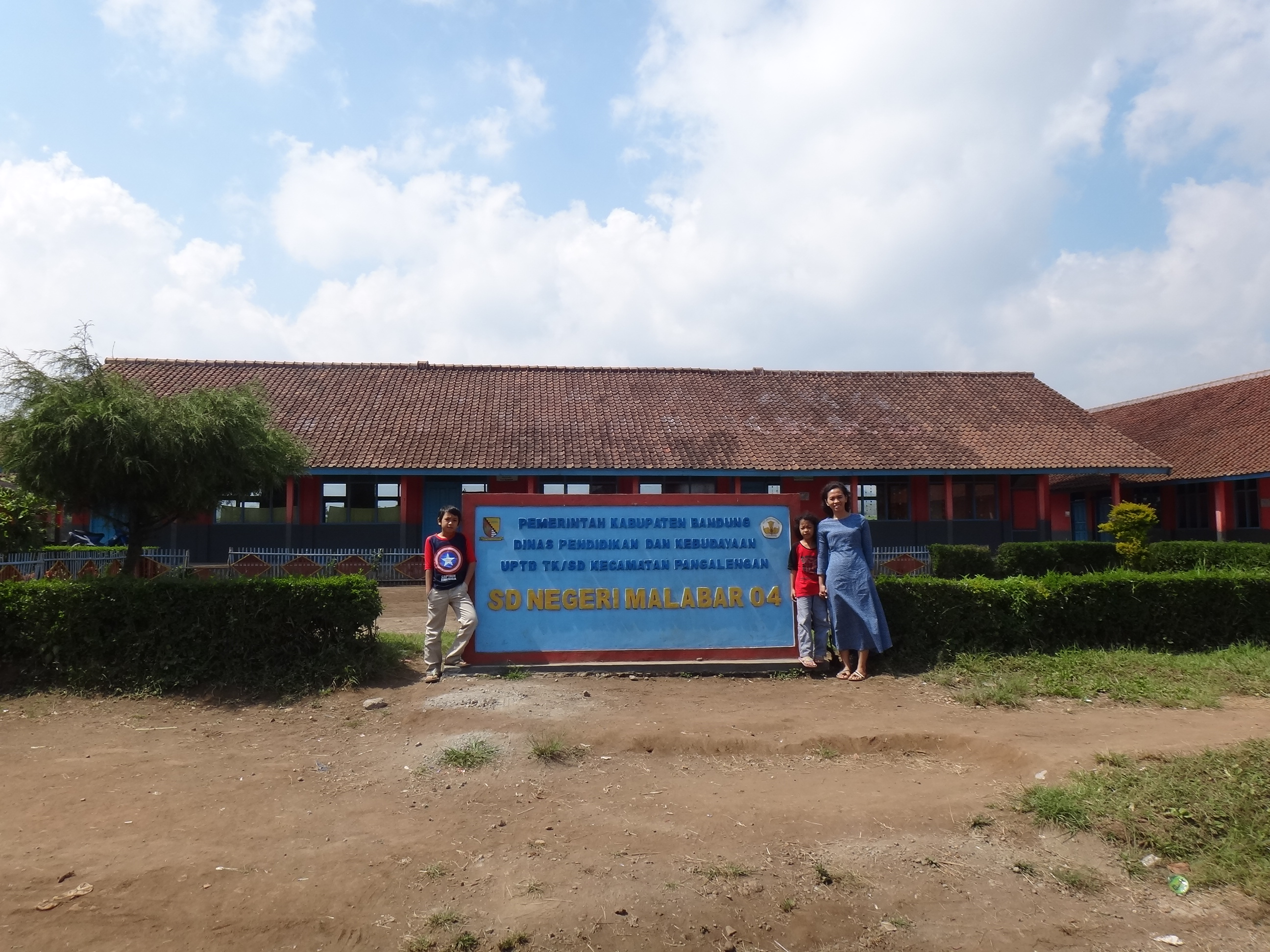
description of Malabar elementary school

For his work and contribution to the society, he was awarded honorary citizenship of Bandung. An asteroid (11431 Karelbosscha) was named after him in 1971.
