= Syro-Malabar (disambiguation) =

The Syro-Malabar Catholic Church is an Eastern Catholic church based in Kerala, India.

Syro-Malabar may also refer to:

- Syro-Malabar Rite, designation for the Malabar variant of the East Syriac Rite
- Malabar Independent Syrian Church, an independent Church in India

== See also ==
- Malabar (disambiguation)
- Malankara (disambiguation)
