= Malankara =

Malankara may refer to:

- Malankara Church, a collection of Indian apostolic churches
  - Malankara Jacobite Syrian Orthodox Church, an autonomous division of the Syriac Orthodox Church in India
  - Malankara Orthodox Syrian Church, an Oriental Orthodox denomination in India
  - Syro-Malankara Catholic Church, an Eastern Catholic denomination in India
  - Malankara Mar Thoma Syrian Church, a Reformed Syrian Church denomination in India
- Malankara Metropolitan, a legal title given to the head of the Malankara Church Puthenkoor Christians
- Malankara Rite, a use of the West Syriac liturgical rite

== See also ==
- Malankara Syriac Orthodox Church (disambiguation)
- Syro-Malabar (disambiguation)
- Malabar (disambiguation)
