= Jong Islamieten Bond =

Former Islamic organization based in Dutch East Indies

Jong Islamieten Bond (JIB) or Islamic Youth Association was a youth organization during the Dutch East Indies ruling established in Batavia on January 1, 1925. The organization was established by Indonesian young students with the first goal to provide courses on Islam to Muslim students to engage a sense of brotherhood amongst the educated Muslim youth from different regions of the archipelago who were previously members of local associations, such as Jong Java (March 7, 1915), Jong Sumatra (December 9, 1917), and others.

JIB was not a political organization. The first elected chairman at the first JIB Congress in 1925 in Yogyakarta, Samsurijal, when giving the speech said, "In the courses, lectures, and debates which we hold, we try as far as possible to enhance the understanding of religion and politics, especially from the point of Islam to members, but JIB will not join any political activities". The composition of the first Executive Committee of the newly created JIB was: Raden Samsurijal (chairman); Wibowo Purbohadidjojo (vice-chairman); Syahbuddin Latif (Secretary I); Hoesin (secretary II), Soetijono (treasurer I); and So'eb (treasurer II). The Commissioners were Moegni, Thoib, Soewardi, Shamsuddin, Soetan Palindih, Kasman Singodimedjo, Mohammad Koesban, Soegeng, and Haji Hashim. The Executive Committee of the new JIB has four branches: Batavia, Yogyakarta, Solo, and Madiun. The position of the Central Executive Board (DPP) was located in Batavia.

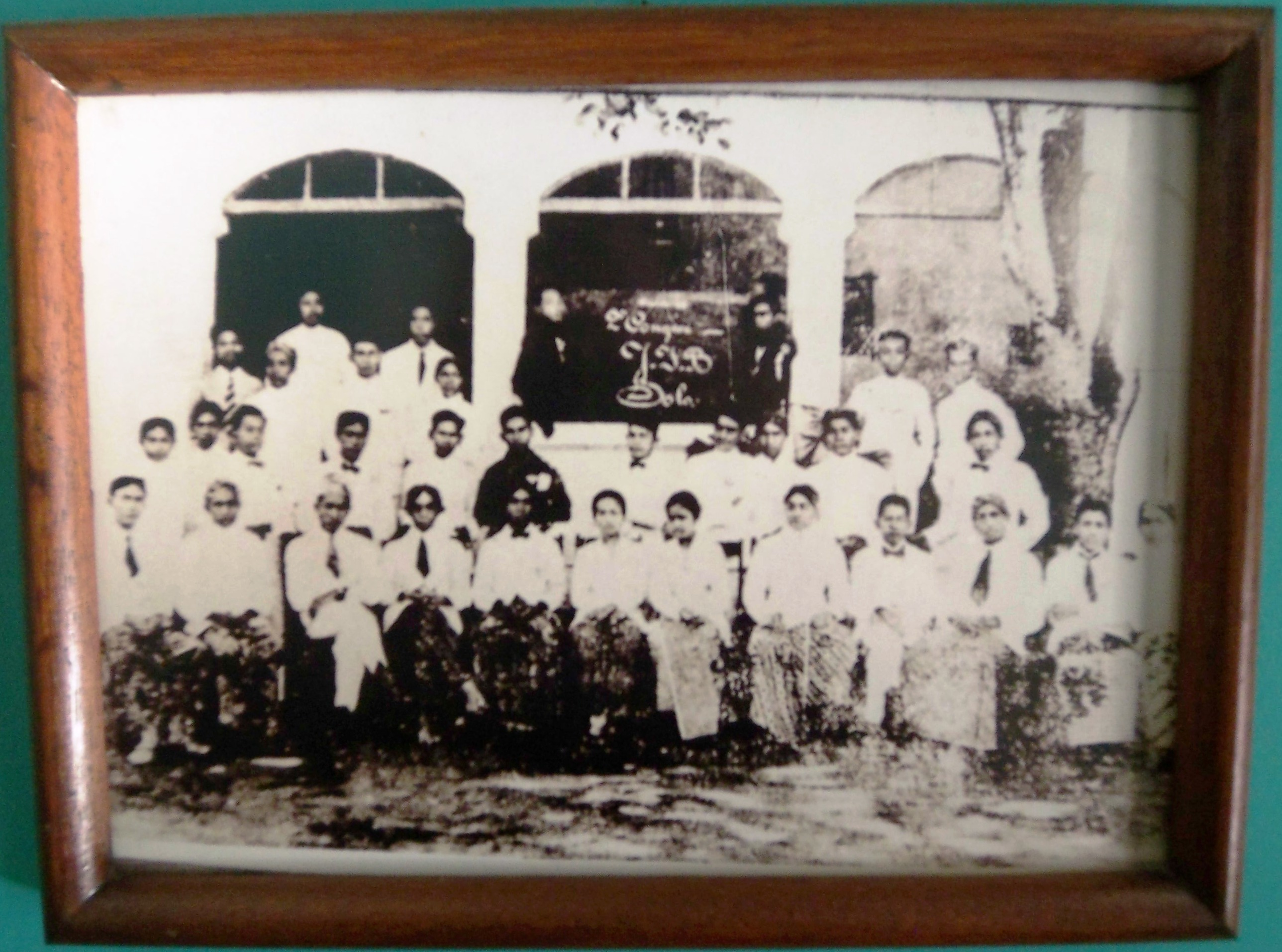
Jong Islamieten Bond of Indonesia

During the JIB membership campaign, Syahbuddin Latif was sent to Yogyakarta and Madiun, Mohammad Koesban to Solo, Kasman Singodimedjo to Purworedjo and Kutorejo while Samsurijal and the advisor to JIB, Haji Agus Salim to Bandung to establish a JIB branch. As of December 1925, JIB had 7 branches with 1,004 members. At the JIB Congress II in Solo in 1926, Wiwoho was elected as chairman replacing Samsurijal. At the JIB Congress in 1929 in Batavia, Kasman Singodimedjo was elected as the chairman replacing Wiwoho, and also moved the position of the DPP to Jakarta. At the JIB Congress in 1935 in Jakarta, M. Arif Aini was elected as the chairman and the position of the DPP moved to Semarang.

To disseminate their ideas and thoughts, JIB published a magazine named an Nur (Het Licht) in Dutch which was the first Islamic scholarly magazine in Indonesia, published in March 1925. The magazine survived until the dissolution of the JIB itself. JIB also formed Indonesian Scout Organizations (National Indonesische Padvinderij, abbreviated Natipij), the first scout organization that uses the name of Indonesia, a term that was not commonly used at the time. In each branch, JIB held Islamic religious courses. In October 1931 JIB built a HIS (Hollandsch Inlandsche School) school, an elementary school for higher class indigenous children in Tegal and in November 1931 another HIS school was built in Batavia.

During the Japanese occupation of the Dutch East Indies, all organizations were put on freeze, including JIB. In 1947, the original frozen JIB transformed into a new organization called PII (Pelajar Islam Indonesia or Islamic students of Indonesia).
