= Malai (disambiguation) =

Malai is a type of clotted cream used in the cuisine of the Indian subcontinent.

Malai may also refer to:

- Malai District, Cambodia
- Malai (commune), a commune in the district
- Malai Gas Field, a natural gas field in Turkmenistan
- Nick Malai (born 1987), Albanian professional pool player
- Litsea garciae, a tree native to Asia locally called malai
- Malai Vellalar, a people of southern India

== Other ==
- Malabar (disambiguation), a region of India also known as Malaya and Malai
- Malaya (disambiguation)
- Tirumalai (disambiguation)
