= Tirumalai =

Tirumalai may refer to:

== Geography ==
- Tirumala, a pilgrim hill town in Tirupati district, Andhra Pradesh, India
  - Tirumala Venkateswara Temple, the Hindu temple at Tirumala
- Tirumalai (Tamil Nadu), a mountain and Jain site near Polur, Tamil Nadu, India
  - Tirumalai Jain Math, Jain temple
- Thirumalai nagar, neighbourhood of Chennai, India
- Thirumalai Nayakkar Mahal, 17th-century palace in Madurai, Tamil Nadu, India
- Thirumalai Engineering College, Kanchipuram, Tamil Nadu, India

== Others ==
- Tirumalai Krishnamacharya (1888–1989), Indian yogi
- Tirumalai Nayak, 17th century ruler of Madurai Nayak dynasty of India
- Tirumalai Srinivasan, Indian cricketer
- Tirumālai, Tamil Hindu work of literature

== See also ==
- Malai (disambiguation)
- Venkata (disambiguation)
- Tirupati (disambiguation)
- Venkatachalam (disambiguation)
- Thirumalai, 2003 Indian Tamil film starring Vijay
