= Artati Marzuki-Sudirdjo =

Indonesian diplomat and politician

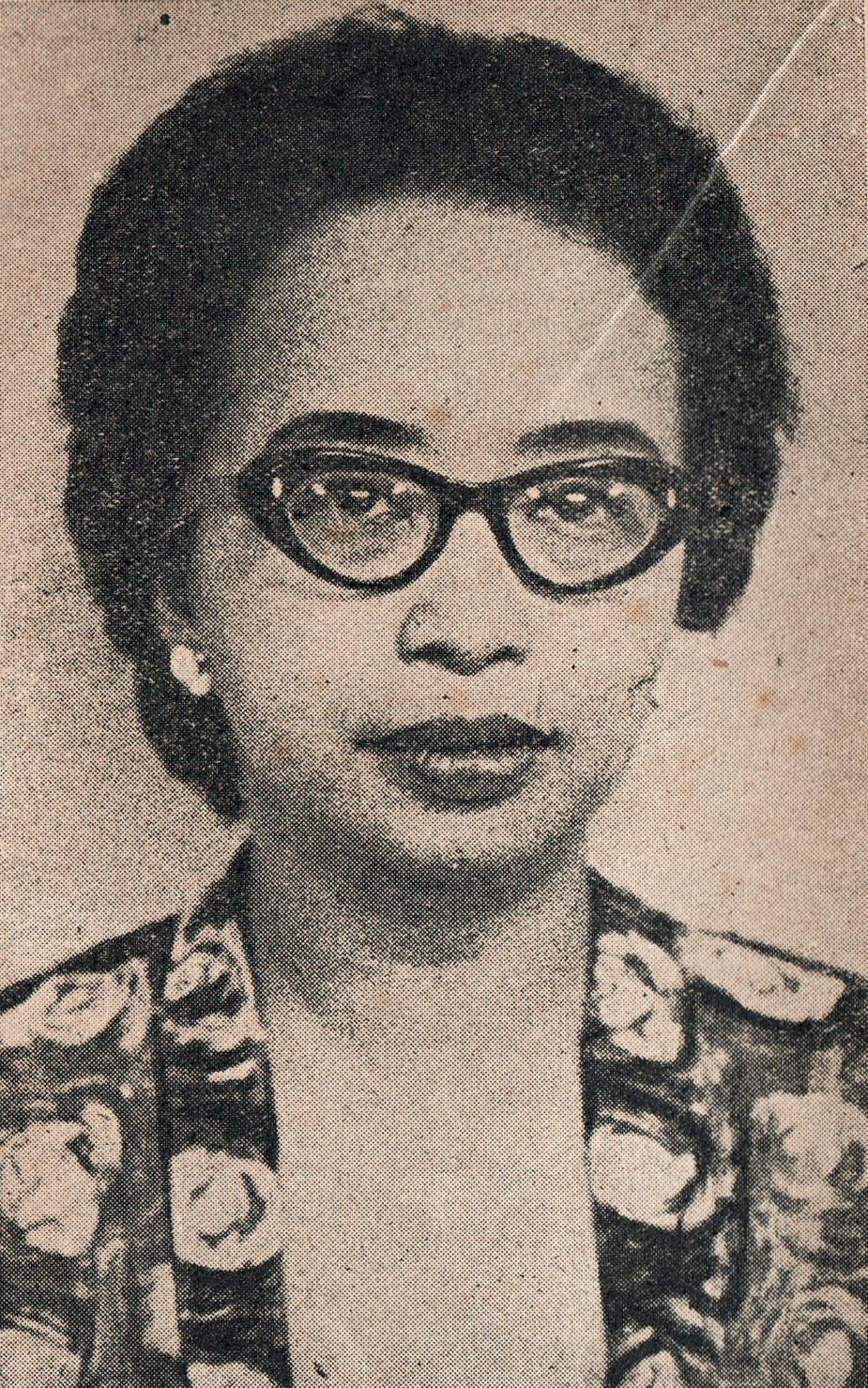
- Artati in 1965

30th Chairperson of the IAEA Board of Governors
- In office 1985–1986
- Preceded by: M.E. Taher Shash
- Succeeded by: M. A. Khan

1st Minister of Basic Education and Culture
- In office 27 August 1964 – 22 February 1966
- Preceded by: None
- Succeeded by: Sumardjo
Diplomatic posts
9th Indonesian Ambassador to Austria
In office 1983–1987
Preceded by	Haryono Nimpuno
Succeeded by	S. Wirjono
9th Indonesian Ambassador to Switzerland
In office 1982–1983
Preceded by	Suryono Darusman
Succeeded by	Prapto Prayitno

Personal details
- Born: 15 June 1921 Salatiga, Dutch East Indies
- Died: 19 April 2011 (aged 89) Jakarta, Indonesia
- Children: 3
- Occupation: Diplomat; Politician

Artati Marzuki-Sudirdjo (15 June 1921 – 19 April 2011) was an Indonesian diplomat and politician. She served as Minister of Basic Education and Culture in the Dwikora Cabinet from 1964 to 1966.

== Early life ==
Artati was born on 15 June 1921 in Salatiga, Dutch East Indies to R.Sudirdjo Djodjodihardjo and R.A Sumiati Reksohaminoto. Her father worked as the chief engineer of Malabar Radio Station. Completing high school at the Bandoeng Hogere Burgerschool law school, in 1939, she continued her higher education at the Rechtshoogeschool te Batavia and finished it in 1941 with a Candidate II diploma.

== Career ==
=== Sukarno Era ===
During the Indonesian National Revolution, Artati worked at the Indonesian Red Cross Society Bandung Branch. Due to the March 1946 burning of Bandung, she moved to Dayeuhkolot and worked as an English radio broadcaster at Voice of Free Indonesia. Later, she moved to Yogyakarta and participated in the one-year Ministry of Foreign Affairs diplomatic and consular course, completing it in May 1947. Afterward, she was appointed as a politics and consular staffer at the Ministry of Foreign Affairs.

In 1950, Artati enrolled in the University of Indonesia, majoring in law, but she did not graduate. In the same year, she moved to New York and worked as a permanent representative of Indonesia to the United Nations for three years. In 1954, she returned to Jakarta and worked as Head of Social Affairs of the United Nations Directorate until 1958. From 1958 to 1961, Artati worked as Head of Politics of the Embassy of Indonesia in Rome, Italy. Afterwards, she served at the Directorate of International Organization Ministry of Foreign Affairs until 1964.

In 1964, Artati was appointed as the Minister of Basic Education and Culture, although she had no educational background. Her appointment aimed to resolve the conflict between two bloks in the education department, the Serikat Sekerja Pendidikan (SSP, Education Workers' Union) and Serikat Sekerja Pendidikan dan Kebudayaan (SSPK, Education and Culture Worker's Union). She held this position until February 1966.

=== Suharto Era ===
In 1966, Artati returned to the Ministry of Foreign Affairs and was appointed secretary general. Then, in 1971, she became Inspector general of the Ministry of Foreign Affairs until 1973. After that, she took a job as a member of the Supreme Advisory Council from 1973 to 1978. Subsequently, she became a member of the Department of Justice's Standing Committee in the Humanitarian Law Department until 1982.

From June 1982, she served as the Indonesian Ambassador to Switzerland for one year. Subsequently, she became the Indonesian Ambassador to Austria, serving concurrently as Indonesian permanent representative to the UN and International Organizations in Vienna. In 1985, she was elected as Chairperson of the IAEA Board of Governors and served it for one year. As a chairperson of the IAEA's Board of Governors, she chaired a special meeting of the Board of Governors on the Chernobyl disaster.

== Death ==
Artati died at 07:30 on Tuesday, 19 April 2011, and was buried in the Kalibata Heroes' Cemetery.

== Personal life ==
Artati spoke English, Dutch, French, and Italian. She could also understand German and Japanese.

== Bibliography ==
- Sumardi, S. (1984). Menteri-Menteri Pendidikan Dan Kebudayaan Sejak Tahun 1966. Jakarta: Ministry of Education, Culture, Research, and Technology.
