= List of ambassadors of Indonesia to Austria =

Ambassador of Indonesia to Austria Accredited to Slovenia, UNIDO, IAEA, CTBTO, OPEC, OPEC Fund and UN Office in Vienna
- Duta Besar Indonesia untuk Austria; Indonesischer Botschafter in Österreich
- Emblem of the Ministry of Foreign Affairs

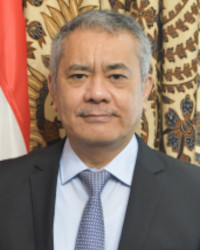
- Incumbent; Damos Dumoli Agusman since 17 November 2021
- Ministry of Foreign Affairs; Embassy of Indonesia, Vienna
- Style: His Excellency (formal)
- Seat: Vienna, Austria
- Appointer: President of Indonesia
- Inaugural holder: Max Maramis
- Formation: 1956
- Website: kemlu.go.id/vienna

The following are the list of Indonesian diplomats that served as Ambassador of the Republic of Indonesia to the Republic of Austria.

No.	Ambassador	Term start	Term end	Accredited to	Appointed by	Ref.
1	Max Maramis	1956	1957		Sukarno	
2	Soebagio	1957	1958		Sukarno	
3	Raden Roesman M. Djajakusuma	1958	1962		Sukarno	
4	Busono Darusman	1962	1967		Sukarno	
5	Laili Roesad	1967	1970			
6	Ide Anak Agung Gde Agung	1970	1974		Soeharto	
7	Abdullah Kamil	1974	1979		Soeharto	
8	Haryono Nimpuno	1979	1983		Soeharto	
9	Artati Marzuki-Sudirdjo	1983	1987		Soeharto	
10	S. Wirjono	1987	1989		Soeharto	
11	Johanes Petrus Louhanapessy	1989	1993		Soeharto	
12	Agus Tarmidzi	1993	1995		Soeharto	
13	Sumaryo Suryokusumo	1995	1998	Slovenia	Soeharto	
14	Rhousdy Soeriaatmadja	1998	2002	Slovenia		
15	T. A. Samodra Sriwijaya	2002	30 September 2005	Slovenia	Abdurrahman Wahid	
16	Triyono Wibowo	11 November 2005	2008	Slovenia	Susilo Bambang Yudhoyono	
17	I Gusti Agung Wesaka Puja	2010	September 2012	Slovenia	Susilo Bambang Yudhoyono	
18	Rachmat Budiman	2012	13 March 2017	Slovenia	Susilo Bambang Yudhoyono	
19	Darmansjah Djumala	13 March 2017; Credential: 4 July 2019 (Austria); 12 July 2017 (Slovenia)	September 2021	Slovenia	Joko Widodo	
20	Damos Dumoli Agusman	17 November 2021; Credential: 15 March 2022 (Austria); 20 April 2022 (Slovenia)	Incumbent	Slovenia	Joko Widodo	

== See also ==
- List of Indonesian ambassadors
- List of diplomatic missions of Indonesia
- Embassy of Austria, Jakarta
- Foreign relations of Austria
- Indonesia–Austria relations
