= Wiwoho Purbohadidjojo =

Indonesian nationalist (1898-?)

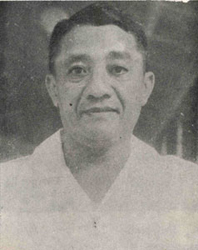

3rd Ambassador of Indonesia to Belgium and Luxembourg
- In office 1956–1959
- President: Sukarno
- Preceded by: Mohamad Razif
- Succeeded by: Laili Roesad

Minister of Information
- In office 21 January 1950 – 6 September 1950
- President: Assaat
- Prime Minister: Abdul Halim
- Preceded by: Samsoeddin
- Succeeded by: M.A. Pellaupessy

Personal details
- Born: 31 August 1898 Bejen, Temanggung, Dutch East Indies
- Died: Unknown ?
- Party: Masyumi

Raden Wiwoho Purbohadidjojo (31 August 1898–?) was an Indonesian nationalist from Temanggung and one of the founders of Jong Islamieten Bond. He served as the minister of information in the Halim Cabinet and the ambassador of Indonesia to Belgium from 1956 to 1959.

== Early life and career ==
Wiwoho Purbohadidjojo was born in Bejen on 31 August 1898. His father was a wedana (district chief) in Bagelen. Wiwoho studied at HBS. In 1917, he founded a student association in Bandung, Bond Van Inlandse Studerenden. He finished his education at HBS in 1918.

After finishing high school at HBS, Wiwoho was appointed as a principal of Adhi-Dharmo School in Yogyakarta. Later, he resigned from his job as school principal and moved to Semarang to work at the railway company, Nederlandsch-Indische Spoorweg Maatschappij.

== Political career ==
=== Dutch East Indies period ===
In Semarang, he joined National Indische Partij. In 1921, he became a member of Semarang Gemeenteraad, representing Indische Partij. Wiwoho was also appointed as the chief of railroad workers and became a member of the Semarang railroad workers union.

==== Jong Islamieten Bond ====
Wiwoho moved to Yogyakarta in 1922 because the NIS office moved to Yogya and he lived there for five years. In 1925, Wiwoho and his colleagues founded a Muslim youth organization named Jong Islamieten Bond (JIB) and he was appointed as the vice chairman. Two years after JIB was founded, he was designated as the chairman of Jong Islamieten Bond until 1928. During his tenure as the chairman, JIB established a scouting organization, Nationale Indonesische Padvinderij. In 1928, Wiwoho attended the second youth congress representing Jong Islamieten Bond.

==== Volksraad ====
On 15 June 1931, Wiwoho became Volksraad member. He served at Volksraad until 1942. In 1937, Wiwoho was appointed as Volksraad's Working Committee member. As a member of Volksraad, Wiwoho proposed a motion that required a five-year transitional period before Indonesia became an independent country due to the political situation in Asia, and together with Mohammad Husni Thamrin and Soetardjo Kartohadikusumo, he filed a motion to the Dutch colonial government to replace the name of Dutch East India into Indonesia in August 1939. The Dutch East Indies Government rejected the latter motion.

He also fought against any form of insulting Islam. On 29 July 1931, he protested Hoa Kiao magazine for writing an article that mocked Prophet Muhammad. His protest led to the demonstration of 6000 Muslims against the magazine in Surabaya. One month later, on 7 August 1931, Wiwoho complained about the article made by Jan ten Berge that offended Muslims.

==== Indonesian Islamic Party ====
On 4 December 1938, Wiwoho, with his companions, founded the Indonesian Islamic Party and he was appointed as the party's chairman. Together with Wali Alfatah and Dr. Sukardi, Wiwoho is one of the three members of the PII board who was not from Muhammadiyah.

=== Japanese Occupation Era ===
During the Japanese occupation era, Wiwoho served as a member of the Central Advisory Council.

=== Indonesia Period ===
In 1945, he became the chairman of the Regional Leadership Council. Afterward, he was designated as Head of the Secretariat of Staff of Region V Military Government in Java. On 21 January 1950, Wiwoho was appointed as the Minister of Information Republic of Indonesia in the Halim Cabinet, replacing Raden Sjamsoeddin. He served as the minister of information until 6 September 1950.

Wiwoho was elected as a Yogyakarta Regional People's Representative Council member in 1951, representing the Masyumi Party On 17 January 1952, Wiwoho was chosen as the speaker of the Yogyakarta Regional People's Representative Council through voting. In 1956, Wiwoho was appointed as ambassador of Indonesia to Belgium. He served it until 1959. In 1959, Wiwoho became a member of the People's Representative Council of Indonesia, replacing Prawoto Mangkusasmito.

== Bibliography ==
- Kementerian Penerangan, Kementerian Penerangan (1950). Kabinet Republik Indonesia. Jakarta: Kementerian Penerangan RI.
- Abdul Rahman, Momon; Darmansyah, Darmansyah; Wardoyo, Kusmo; Winarti, Siti Sugi; Misman, Misman (2006). Jong Islamieten Bond: Pergerakan Pemuda Islam 1925-1942. Jakarta: Museum Sumpah Pemuda.
