= Malankara Syriac Orthodox Church (disambiguation) =

The Malankara Syriac Orthodox Church is the historical title of the Indian Archbishopric of the Syriac Orthodox Church known presently as the Jacobite Syrian Christian Church since 2002.

It may also refer to:

- Malankara Church (historical)
- Malankara Orthodox Syrian Church
- Malankara Rite

== See also ==
- Malankara (disambiguation)
