= Malaba, Cameroon =

Malaba
- Location in Cameroon
- Coordinates: 2°28′N 9°50′E
- Country: Cameroon
- Province: South Province

Malaba is a village in the South Province of Cameroon. It is located on the Atlantic coast north of Campo.
