= Laili Roesad =

Indonesian diplomat (1916–2003)

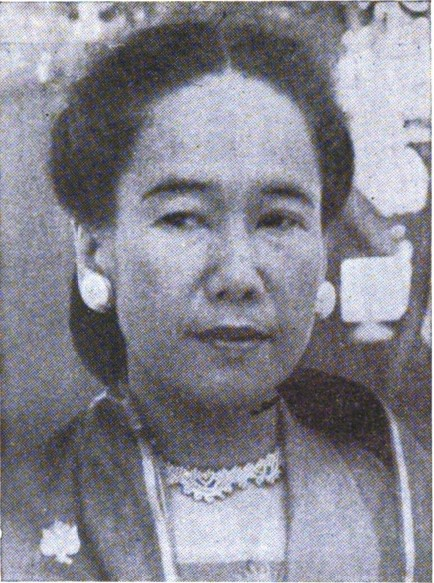
- Official portrait, c. 1958

5th Ambassador of Indonesia to Austria
- In office 1967–1970
- President: Soeharto
- Preceded by: Busono Darusman
- Succeeded by: Ide Anak Agung Gde Agung

4th Ambassador of Indonesia to Belgium and Luxembourg
- In office 1959–1964
- President: Sukarno
- Preceded by: Raden Wiwoho Purbohadidjojo
- Succeeded by: Thoyib Hadiwidjaja

Personal details
- Born: 19 September 1916 Padang, Dutch East Indies
- Died: 18 February 2003 (aged 86)
- Resting place: Tanah Kusir Cemetery
- Profession: Diplomat

Laili Roesad (19 September 1916 – 18 February 2003) was an Indonesian diplomat. She served as the Ambassador of Indonesia to Belgium from 1959 to 1964 and as the Ambassador of Indonesia to Austria from 1967 to 1970. Roesad was the country's first female diplomat and ambassador and was often attended international conferences, including diplomatic law, atomic power in Vienna, and negotiations on the West New Guinea Dispute.

== Early life ==
Roesad was born on 19 September 1916 in Padang, West Sumatra, to Rusad Datuk Parpatih Baringek and Hasnah. She was of Minangkabau descent. Her father was a prominent Minangnese figure and her mother was the first Minang woman who studied at MULO, albeit she did not finish it. She finished high school at HIS Adabiah. Roesad continued her higher education at Rechtshoogeschool te Batavia and graduated in 1941, making her the first West Sumatran women law graduate.

== Career ==
Roesad began her career as an employee of the Council of Justice in Padang. However, because women were unable to become judges at the time, she switch careers to diplomacy by joining the Ministry of Foreign Affairs in 1949. While working at the Ministry, she took an international law class in London in 1950. As a diplomat, she represented Indonesia in several UN meetings. In 1955, she ran as the PNI's Constitutional Assembly candidate representing Central Sumatra in the 1955 Constitutional Assembly election and lost.

Roesad was appointed as the Deputy Chairman of the Ministry of Foreign Affairs UN Directorate in 1956. Three years later, she became the Ambassador to Belgium and Luxembourg replacing Wiwoho until 1964. She then returned to Indonesia and served as the Ministry of Foreign Affairs Head of the Legal Directorate until April 1967. Afterwards, she became Ambassador to Austria (1967-1970). While serving as the Ambassador of Austria, She also became a member on the Board of Governors at the International Atomic Energy Agency. During her career, Roesad often attended international conferences, including those on diplomatic law, atomic power in Vienna and negotiations on the West New Guinea dispute.

Roesad decided to retire from diplomat career in 1970. In 1995, the government awarded her 1st class Star of Service.

Roesad died on 18 February 2003 and was buried in Tanah Kusir Cemetery on the following day.

== Awards ==
Roesad was awarded with a service star from Belgium and Luxembourg government.
