= Manjeri Venkatachalam =

Professor of biochemistry

Academic background
- Education: Calcutta Medical College

Academic work
- Discipline: Pathology
- Sub-discipline: Renal pathology
- Institutions: University of Texas Health Science Center at San Antonio

Manjeri Venkatachalam is a professor of biochemistry and pathologist at the Long School of Medicine at the University of Texas Health Science Center at San Antonio. He primarily studies renal pathology and stem cell therapy.

== Education ==
Venkatachalam received his MBBS from Calcutta Medical College in 1962. He has been affiliated with the University of Texas Health Science Center at San Antonio as a professor of pathology since 1979.
