= Malabar rainforests =

Ecoregions in India

The term Malabar rainforests refers to one or more distinct ecoregions recognized by biogeographers:

1. the Malabar Coast moist forests formerly occupied the coastal zone to the 250 metre elevation (but 95% of these forests no longer exist)
2. the South Western Ghats moist deciduous forests grow at intermediate elevations
3. the South Western Ghats montane rain forests cover the areas above 1000 metres elevation

== Malabar Coast moist forests ==
The Malabar Coast moist forests is a tropical moist broadleaf forest ecoregion of southwestern India. It lies along India's Konkan and Malabar coasts, in a narrow strip between the Arabian Sea and the Western Ghats range, which runs parallel to the coast. It has an area of 35,500 square kilometres (13,700 sq mi), and extends from northern Maharashtra through Goa, Karnataka and Kerala to Kanniyakumari in southernmost Tamil Nadu. In March 2016, the Agasthyamala Biosphere Reserve was included in the Biosphere programme of UNESCO at the International Coordinating Council held in Peru.

== South Western Ghats moist deciduous forests ==
This ecoregion in the south of the Western Ghats consists of moist deciduous forests, spanning Kerala and Tamil Nadu. It has an area of 9,200 square miles. Ecologically, it is home to genuses such as Adina, Albizia, Lagerstroemia, Pterocarpus, and Terminalia.

== South Western Ghats montane rain forests ==
The Malabar squirrel is also found in the Malabar rainforests.

== See also ==
- Malabar (Northern Kerala)
- North Malabar
