= Padma Venkataraman =

Indian social activist

- Born: 1942 (age 83–84)
- Relatives: R. Venkataraman (father)

Padma Venkataraman (born 1942) is an Indian social activist and the President of the Women's Indian Association. She has focused on women’s welfare issues and rehabilitation of leprosy-affected persons. She is the eldest daughter of former President of India R. Venkataraman.

== Awards ==
She received the Avvaiyar Award from the Government of Tamil Nadu in 2017.
