= Malabar, Indonesia =

Area in Indonesia on Java

Malabar is an area in Indonesia in Java. It is in the province of West Java, in the Bandung Regency, south of the city of Bandung near Mount Malabar (Gunung Malabar), a stratovolcano. It was formerly well known as a hill station near to the town of Pangalengan for recreation during the Dutch period in Indonesia. Some of the tea estates in the area provide good facilities for tourists to stay overnight, walk through tracks in the tea plantations, and bath in nearby hot springs. One of the main tea estates in the area, the Malabar Tea Estate, was for many years (1886–1928) managed by K.A.R. Bosscha who was active in the development of the region.

== Radio history ==
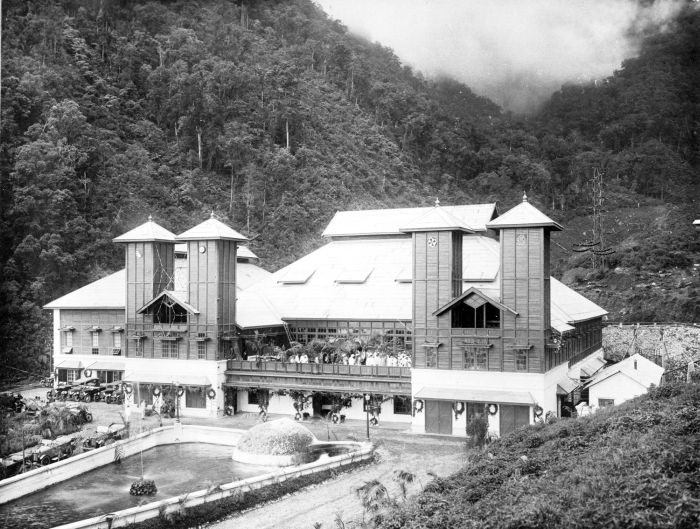
Malabar Radio Station on 5 May 1923 - the day of its official opening

In the era just before the beginning of World War I, two spark wireless stations were established in the Dutch East Indies for naval communications. This was in the days before internationally recognized callsigns were in general usage and one of these stations, located at Sabang, was on the air in Morse Code under the irregular callsign SAB.

Immediately after the end of the war, there were four such stations in the Dutch East Indies, and these were all designated with callsigns in the new PK series: PKA Sabang, PKB Weltevreden, PKC Sitoebondo, and PKD Koepang'. Soon afterwards, the Dutch government in Batavia announced that a huge arc transmitter station, using Telefunken arc equipment, was under installation at Malabar, near Bandoeng. This massive 3.5 megawatt station was established for communication with the home office in the Netherlands.

The date for the official opening of this station was set at May 5, 1923. However, a tropical lightning strike destroyed some of the equipment and the opening was postponed until repairs were completed. By this time, however, arc transmitters were becoming obsolete, and valve or vacuum tube transmitters were soon afterwards installed at this same location on the island of Java.

== See also ==
- History of radio
