= HMS Malabar =

Five ships and a shore establishment of the Royal Navy have borne the name HMS Malabar, after Malabar, a region of India:

- HMS Malabar was a 54-gun fourth rate, previously the East Indiaman Royal Charlotte. The Admiralty purchased her in 1795, but she foundered under tow in 1796.
- HMS Malabar (1804) was a 56-gun fourth rate, previously the East Indiaman Cuvera. The Admiralty purchased her in 1804 and had her rebuilt as a 20-gun storeship in 1806. She was renamed HMS Coromandel in 1815 and transported convicts to Australia in 1819. From 1828 to 1853, when she was broken up, she served as a prison hulk in Bermuda, beginning a long association between this name and the colony.
- HMS Malabar (1818) was a 74-gun third rate launched in 1818. She was used as a coal hulk from 1848 and was renamed HMS Myrtle in 1883. She was sold in 1905.
- HMS Malabar (1866) was an iron screw troopship launched in 1866. She became a base ship at the Royal Naval Dockyard, Bermuda in 1897 and was renamed HMS Terror in 1901. She was placed on the sale list in 1914 and was sold in 1918.
- HMS Malabar (shore establishment) was a succession of shore establishments in Bermuda between 1919 and 1951, and 1965 and 1995.

== Other ==
- HCS Malabar (1810) was a 20-gun sloop in Indian service in 1810.
