= USS Malabar =

Cargo ship of the United States Navy

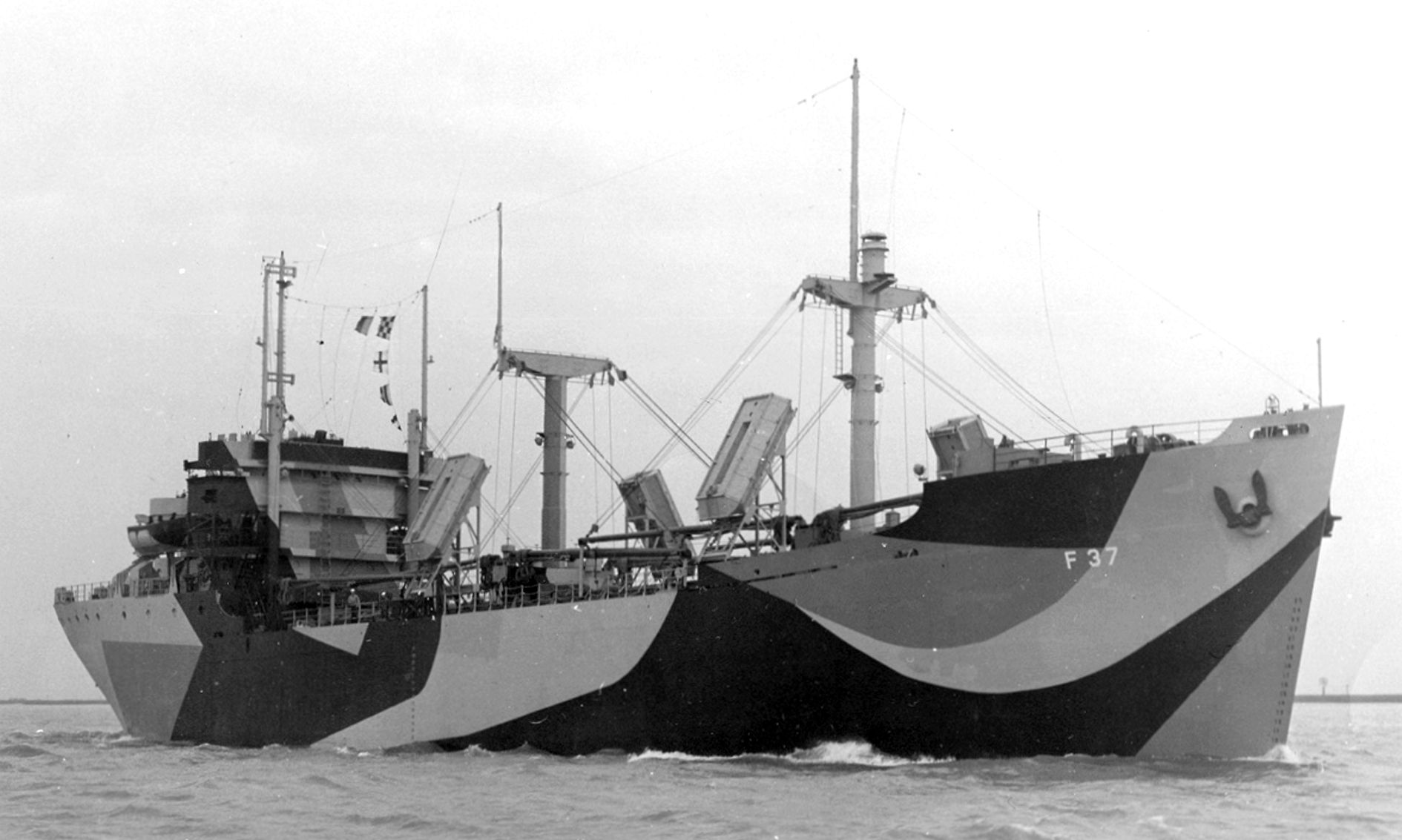

History

United States
- Ordered: as R1-M-AV3 hull, MC hull 2201
- Laid down: 17 July 1944
- Launched: 17 September 1944
- Acquired: 24 February 1945
- Commissioned: 8 March 1945
- Decommissioned: 20 June 1955
- Stricken: 1 July 1960
- Fate: disposed of by MARAD sale, 27 July 1977

General characteristics
- Tonnage: 2,120 long tons deadweight (DWT)
- Displacement: 3,139 t.(lt) 6,240 t.(fl)
- Length: 338 ft (103 m)
- Beam: 50 ft (15 m)
- Draught: 18 ft (5.5 m)
- Propulsion: diesel engine, single screw, 1,700shp
- Speed: 12 kts. (max)
- Complement: 84
- Armament: one single 3 in (76 mm) dual purpose gun mount, six single 20 mm gun mounts

USS Malabar (AF-37) was an Adria-class stores ship in service with the United States Navy from 1945 to 1955. She was scrapped in 1977.

== History ==
Malabar was laid down under Maritime Commission contract by the Pennsylvania Shipyards, Inc., Beaumont, Texas, 17 July 1944; launched 17 September 1944; sponsored by Mrs. W. R. Brennan; acquired by the Navy from the Maritime Commission 24 February 1945; converted by Tennessee Coal & Iron Dock, Houston, Texas, to a refrigeration ship; and commissioned 8 March 1945.

=== World War II ===
Following shakedown in the Gulf of Mexico, Malabar departed Galveston, Texas, for Pearl Harbor 28 March with a stopover at Mobile, Alabama, to embark food supplies for the U.S. Pacific Fleet, arriving Pearl Harbor 1 May. Assigned to Service Squadron 8, Service Force, the storeship, sailed the 11th for the Marianas, via Eniwetok, Marshalls, to unload half of her cargo at Saipan from 27 to 31 May.

She continued on to the Volcano Islands 1 June, arriving Iwo Jima 3 days later. Her task of issuing provisions to 53 ships was interrupted by a typhoon 6 June. After a day and a half of battling the storm, Malabar finally anchored and discharged the rest of her stores to a U.S. Army installation ashore.

On 12 June Malabar returned to Pearl Harbor, again via Saipan, for 12 days of repairs necessitated by the typhoon. She got underway 30 June for a second trip to Eniwetok and, returning to Pearl Harbor, was 1 day out when the Japanese surrendered 15 August.

=== Post-war operations ===
She departed Pearl Harbor the 27th for Japan, via Eniwetok, arriving Tokyo Bay 17 September. Malabar then supplied a record total of 157 ships in 9 days. After upkeep at Pearl from 13 to 27 October, she returned to the central Pacific, sinking two mines en route. On 16 November she reached the Yangtze River and reported to CTU 67.2.3 for supply duty out of Shanghai until 4 December when she got underway for Seattle, Washington, arriving the 22d.

Malabar departed San Pedro, California, for the Philippines 21 February 1946, anchoring in Manila Bay 22 March for a month's service before steaming from Samar, 16 April, for the U.S. East Coast, via San Francisco, California, and the Panama Canal Zone. She arrived Bayonne, New Jersey, 1 July to spend the rest of the year cruising along the Atlantic coast and in the Caribbean from Argentia, Newfoundland, to Bermuda.

=== East Coast operations ===
On 3 January 1947 Malabar departed Bermuda for Europe, arriving Casablanca, French Morocco, the 14th to unload her cargo. After a stop at Naples, Italy, she returned to the U.S. East Coast later in the month to continue her service force operations between Guantanamo Bay, Cuba; Norfolk, Virginia; and Argentia, interspersed with annual supply trips to Europe through the next 8 years.

=== Decommissioning and fate ===
Malabar was placed in reserve at Galveston, Texas, 20 June 1955 before decommissioning 26 September. She remained berthed there in the Atlantic Reserve Fleet until struck from the Navy List 1 July 1960. Final disposition: she was disposed of by MARAD sale, 27 July 1977, her fate unknown.

== Military awards and honors ==
The Navy record does not indicate any battle stars awarded to Malabar. However, her crew was eligible for the following medals:

- China Service Medal (extended)
- American Campaign Medal
- Asiatic-Pacific Campaign Medal
- World War II Victory Medal
- Navy Occupation Service Medal (with Asia clasp)
- National Defense Service Medal
