= Venkatapuram, Krishna district =

Venkatapuram
- Village
- Interactive map of Venkatapuram
- Location in Andhra Pradesh, India Venkatapuram (India)
- Coordinates: 16.5158700°N 81.2581300°E
- Country: India
- State: Andhra Pradesh
- District: Krishna
- Talukas: Bapulapadu

Area
  - Total: 7.96 km^{2} (3.07 sq mi)

Population (2011)
  - Total: 1,318
  - Density: 166/km^{2} (429/sq mi)

Languages
  - Official: Telugu
- Time zone: UTC+5:30 (IST)
- PIN: 521190

Venkatapuram is a village in Krishna district of the Indian state of Andhra Pradesh. It is located in Bapulapadu mandal of Nuzvid revenue division. It is one of the villages in the mandal to be a part of Andhra Pradesh Capital Region.
