= Mount Malabar =

Stratovolcano in west Java, Indonesia

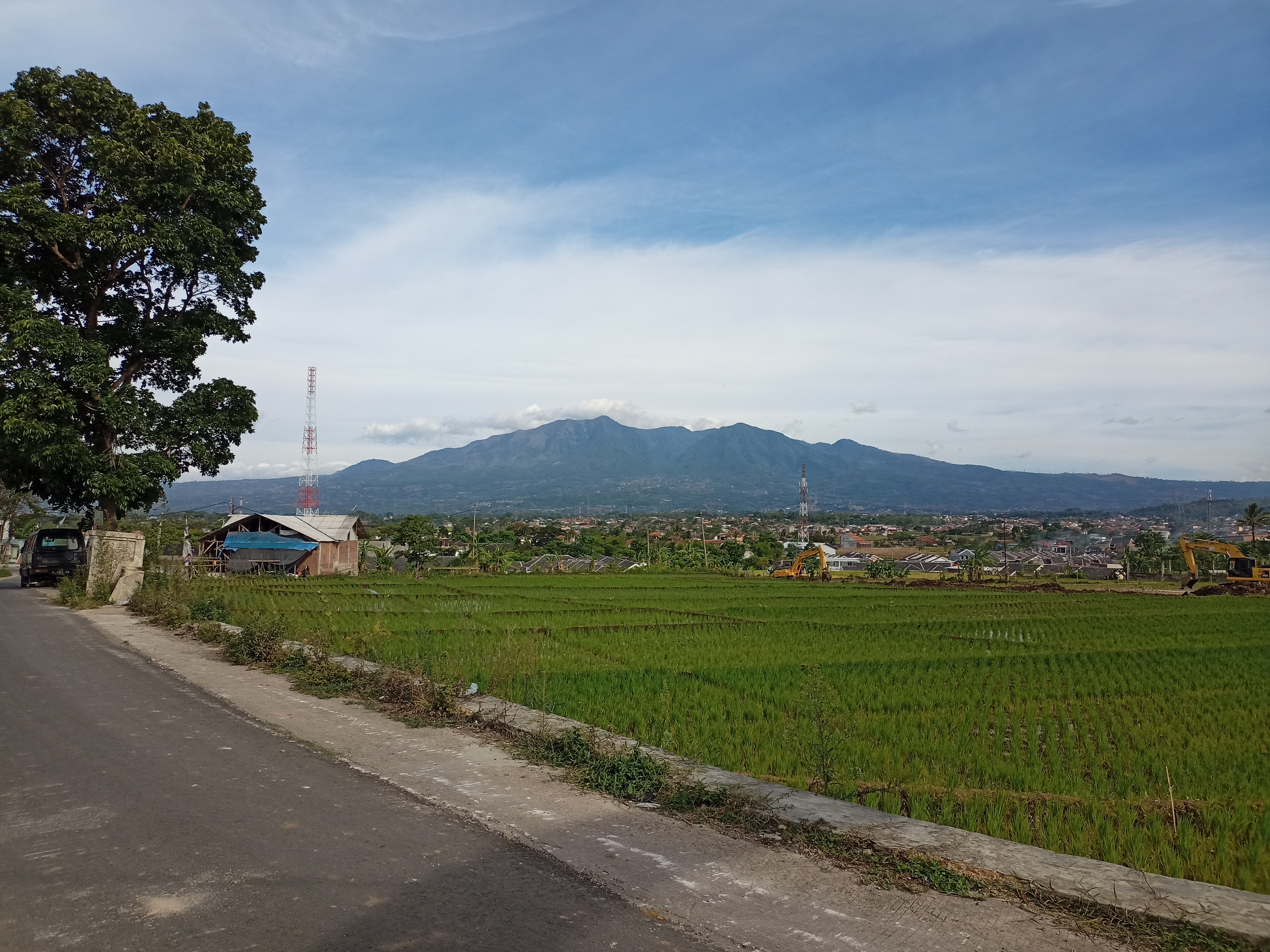
- Mount Malabar seen from Soreang

Highest point
- Elevation: 2,343 m (7,687 ft)
- Coordinates: 7.13°S 107.65°E

Naming
- Native name: ᮌᮥᮔᮥᮀ ᮙᮜᮘᮁ

Geography
- Location within Java Location within Indonesia
- Location: Java, Indonesia

Geology
- Mountain type: Stratovolcano
- Volcanic arc: Sunda Arc
- Last eruption: Pleistocene age

Mount Malabar (Indonesian: Gunung Malabar) is a stratovolcano, located immediately south of Bandung, West Java, Indonesia. The profile is broad with basaltic andesite, type of geological stone.

== See also ==
- List of volcanoes in Indonesia
- Malabar Radio Station
- Malabar (train)
