= Venkatapuram, Jayashankar Bhupalpally district =

Administrative area in Telangana, India

Venkatapuram
- Mandal
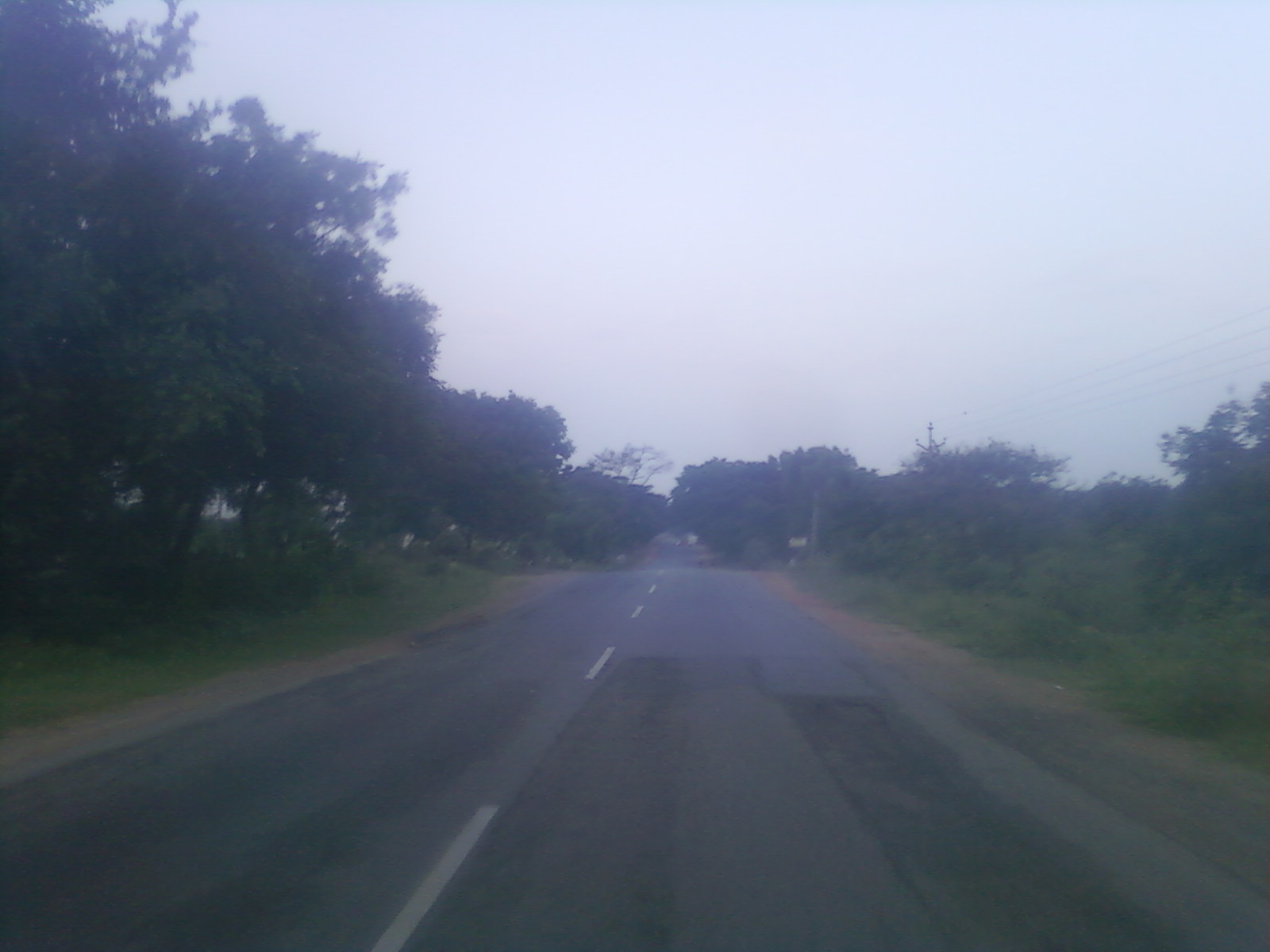
- NH 202 passes through Venkatapuram

- Location in Telangana, India Venkatapuram (India)
- Coordinates: 18°15′00″N 80°40′40″E
- Country: India
- State: Telangana
- District: Mulugu district
- Elevation: 69 m (226 ft)

Languages
  - Official: Telugu
- Time zone: UTC+5:30 (IST)
- Vehicle registration: TS
- Vidhan Sabha constituency: Bhadrachalam
- Climate: hot (Köppen)
- Website: telangana.gov.in

Venkatapuram also known as Nugur Venkatapuram is a mandal in Mulugu District of Telangana, India. Previously, Venkatapuram used to be in Nugur Tehsil or Taluka of East Godavari District of Andhra Pradesh.

== Demographics ==
According to Indian census, 2011, the demographic details of Venkatapuram mandal is as follows:

- Total Population: 31,765
- Male Population: 15,384 and Female Population: 16,381
- Total Literates: 16,984

== Villages ==
The villages in Venkatapuram mandal include:

- Alubaka
- Barlagudem
- Edhira
- Marikala
- Morravarigudem
- Ramachandrapuram
- Ankannagudem
- Veerabhadravaram
- Palem
- Pathrapuram
- Suraveedu
- Chokkala
- Tekulaboru
- Wadagudem
- Nugur
- UppeduVeerapuram
- Napillauru
