= SS Malabar =

A number of steamships have been named Malabar

- SS Malabar (1858), a P & O steamship launched 1858; wrecked at Point de Galle 1860
- SS Malabar (1914)
- MV Malabar (1925), a steamship that wrecked at Sydney, Australia on 2 April 1931. All 108 passengers and crew survived. The town of Malabar within Randwick City Council is named after the ship.
- SS Malabar (1938)
- SS Malabar (1945)
