= Malaba, Ngounié =

Village in Ngounié Province, Gabon

Coordinates: 1°55′S 11°06′E

Malaba is a village in Ngounié Province, Gabon.
