= P. A. Venkatachalam =

Indian academic

P.A.Venkatachalam
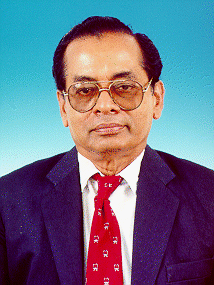
- Paruvachi Ammasai Venkatachalam
- Born: Paruvachi Village, Tamil Nadu State, India
- Other names: PAV, Prof. Venka
- Occupations: Professor, Academician, Researcher

Paruvachi Ammasai Venkatachalam is an Indian academic.

== Career ==
Venkatachalam is among the first 3 people to do a PhD in Computer Science in India when Doctoral Degree in Computer Science was introduced in India for the first time by Professor Vaidyeswaran Rajaraman at Indian Institute of Technology Kanpur in 1968-69 and he was part of this batch. After obtaining his PhD degree, he joined the Department of Electronics and Communication Engineering of College of Engineering, Guindy, Chennai, India as a faculty member in 1973 and served as the Professor and Head of that department from 1978-1987. During this period, he introduced a number of Bachelor's and Master's courses. In 1978, he founded the Department of Computer Science at College of Engineering, Guindy which is the first Computer Science department among all Engineering Colleges in Tamil Nadu State. He was the Professor and Head of that department also in addition to Electronics and Communications Engineering department until 1987. During this period he introduced Bachelor of Science in Computer Science and Master of Computer Applications (MCA) degrees in Tamil Nadu State. Venkatachalam is the first to introduce industrial training programs for Bachelor's and Master's students by collaborating with well known industries in Tamil Nadu state. He then founded the School of Computer Science and Engineering at College of Engineering, Guindy in 1986, of which he was the first Director and Professor until 1988. He then moved to be Professor of Electrical and Computer Engineering at Universiti Sains Malaysia in Ipoh Campus, Malaysia until 2000.

Venkatachalam served as Senior Professor of Electrical, Electronics and Computer Engineering at Universiti Teknologi Petronas in Tronoh Campus, Malaysia between 2001-2009. During his time in these Malaysian universities (1988-2009), he established and led a strong Research and Development Lab in the field of Bio Medical Engineering and Image Processing and won several industry grants to carry out research work. Venkatachalam won over 40 international and national awards during this period including Lifetime Achievement Award from USA for the research and development work that was undertaken under his leadership.

In 1986, Venkatachalam was seconded by the Government of India to serve as a visiting faculty to Asian Institute of Technology, Thailand where he helped Asian Institute of Technology, with setting up the Computer Science Program. He served as fellow of many professional organisations including Computer Society of India, IETE, Indian Academy of Sciences, IEEE, and others. He has written many books on electrical, electronics and computer science which are used as text books in engineering colleges. Venkatachalam has served as member of several committees of universities and engineering colleges in India, as committee member for industries such as ITI, and as Staff Selection Committee Member/Chairman for Indian Space Research Organisation. He has also served as member of many educational and industry committees of Tamil Nadu State and Central governments. He sat in many international and national conference program and advisory committees. He has supervised many Master's and PhD Thesis. Professor Venkatachalam also has the distinction of being the first in India to introduce a computer software application for generating Horoscope in 1977.

== International awards and recognition ==
Venkatachalam has won numerous international and national awards (over 40) including in international research work competitions for his research work in the field of computer science and biomedical engineering. Notable awards include:

- 2006: he won the "Russian Government Award" for Best invention in Medical Science.
- 2007: he won a record four gold medals at INPEX 2007 for his work in the field of medical science and engineering.
- 2007: he won two gold medals for his research work and invention in the field of medical science and engineering at INNOVA EUREKHA.
- 2008: he won two gold and two silver medals for his research work and invention in the field of medical science and engineering at INPEX 2008, when he was also given USA lifetime achievement award.
- He has won many awards and recognitions at the International Invention and Technology Exhibition (ITEX) Conference, including in 2005, 2006, 2007 and 2008.
- 2009: Both his research and inventions in the field of biomedical engineering and electrical engineering won gold medals at ITEX 2009 Conference and gold and bronze medals at the IENA Conference.

== Education ==
- Doctor of Philosophy (PhD) in Computer Science from Indian Institute of Technology, Kanpur, India (1969–73)
- Master of Technology (MTech) in Control Systems Engineering from Indian Institute of Technology, Kharagpur, India (1966–68)
- Bachelor of Engineering with Honours in Electrical and Electronics Engineering from Alagappa College of Engineering, Karaikudi, India (1952–57)

== Background ==
Venkatachalam was born in a small village called Paruvachi between Bhavani town and Anthiyur town. Anthiyur is a taluk and panchayat town in Erode district in the state of Tamil Nadu, India. He was born in an average agricultural family and his father was Ammasai Gounder and mother was Chinnamal. None in Venkatachalam's family completed primary school until he broke the trend. He completed his schooling at Government High School, Anthiyur. He was the first to go to college in his family generation and also among the surrounding villages of Anthiyur. Dr.Venkatachalam's first college degree (Bachelor's degree) inspired many in the surrounding villages of Paruvachi to go for college education.
