= Venkatapuram, Nandyal =

Venkatapuram
- hamlet
- Interactive map of Venkatapuram
- Location in Andhra Pradesh, India Venkatapuram (India)
- Coordinates: 15.4845°N 78.4331°E
- Country: India
- State: Andhra Pradesh
- District: Nandyal district
- Elevation: 216 m (709 ft)

Languages
  - Official: Telugu
- Time zone: UTC+5:30 (IST)
- PIN: 518510
- Nearest city: Nandyal
- Lok Sabha constituency: Nandyal
- Vidhan Sabha constituency: Allagadda
- Climate: hot(Köppen)

Venkatapuram alias Venkateswarapuram is a hamlet in Nandyal mandal in Nandyal District of Andhra Pradesh, India It is in the midway between Kurnool and Kadapa on National Highway-18

== History ==
The village is named after Lord Venkateswara as it hosted seven residents initially, resembling the seven hills of Tirumala
