= Malabar Radio Station =

Former radio telegraphic transmitter in Malabar, Indonesia

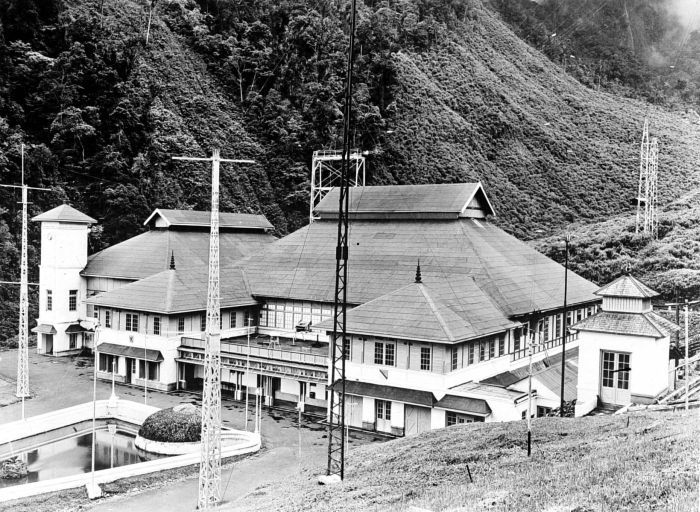
The Malabar Radio Station

Malabar Radio Station was a VLF radio telegraphic transmitter in Malabar, Indonesia ( coordinates: 7°6′58.61″S 107°36′22.26″E), for a radio link to the Netherlands. It used one of the most powerful arc transmitters ever built, which had a power of 2400 kW. Malabar Radio Station used a couple of parallel wires spun about 2 km long between two mountain ridges as an antenna.
