= Orangutan Land Trust =

UK charity

The Orangutan Land Trust
- Founder: Michelle Desilets and Lone Drøscher Nielsen
- Type: Charitable organization
- Purpose: Environmentalism
- Location: Oxford, UK
- Region served: Borneo
- Method: Fundraising
- Leader: Lone Drøscher Nielsen
- Key people: Trustees: Sir David Chivers, Clare McLardy; Scientific Advisors: Simon Husson, Dr Helen Murrogh-Bernard, Dr Ian Singleton, Dr Eric Meijaard; Business Advisor: Alexandra Saunders
- Website: www.orangutanlandtrust.com

The Orangutan Land Trust is a UK charity with the objective of providing sustainable solutions for the long-term survival of the orangutan in the wild by ensuring safe areas of forest for their continued existence. The organization's president, Lone Drøscher Nielsen, is a prominent wildlife conservationist; founder and executive director Michelle Desilets also has extensive experience in supporting orangutans.

== Projects under development ==
=== Salat Island ===
A major objective of Orangutan Land Trust is to secure the river island known as Salat Island in Central Kalimantan to provide a habitat in which orangutans undergoing the rehabilitation process can refine their skills before being released in the wild. Additionally, a part of this island can serve as a permanent sanctuary for those rescued orangutans who can never be released, such as those with chronic disease or disabilities.

=== East Kalimantan Ecosystem Restoration Concessions ===
Borneo Orangutan Survival is one of the Indonesian NGOs seeking ways of reducing emissions from deforestation and degradation (REDD). It has acquired from the Department of Forestry and Ecosystem Restoration Concession with the intention of using the forest area as a release site for rehabilitated orangutans from its Samboja Lestari and Wanariset projects in East Kalimantan (over 200 individuals). The concession is 86,000 hectares of the ex-PT Mugi Triman International (MGI) timber concession. Releases begin in May 2012.

=== Central Kalimantan Ecosystem Restoration Projects ===
Orangutan Land Trust are working with the Green Line Corporation in Indonesia to secure 80,000 hectares of mostly degraded and deforested peat forest in Central Kalimantan as an Ecosystem Restoration Concession, in order to provide sanctuary for at least 200 orangutans rescued and rehabilitated by the Borneo Orangutan Survival Foundation's Nyaru Menteng Project.

=== Sabah, Malaysia ===
The Malua Wildlife Habitat Conservation Bank (Malua BioBank) is located next to one of the last areas of virgin rainforest in Sabah, Malaysia, on the island of Borneo. The Malua BioBank will restore and protect 34,000 hectares (84,000 acres) of critical orangutan habitat called the Malua Forest Reserve.
