= Louise Grossfeldt =

Zoo keeper, primate husbandry specialist

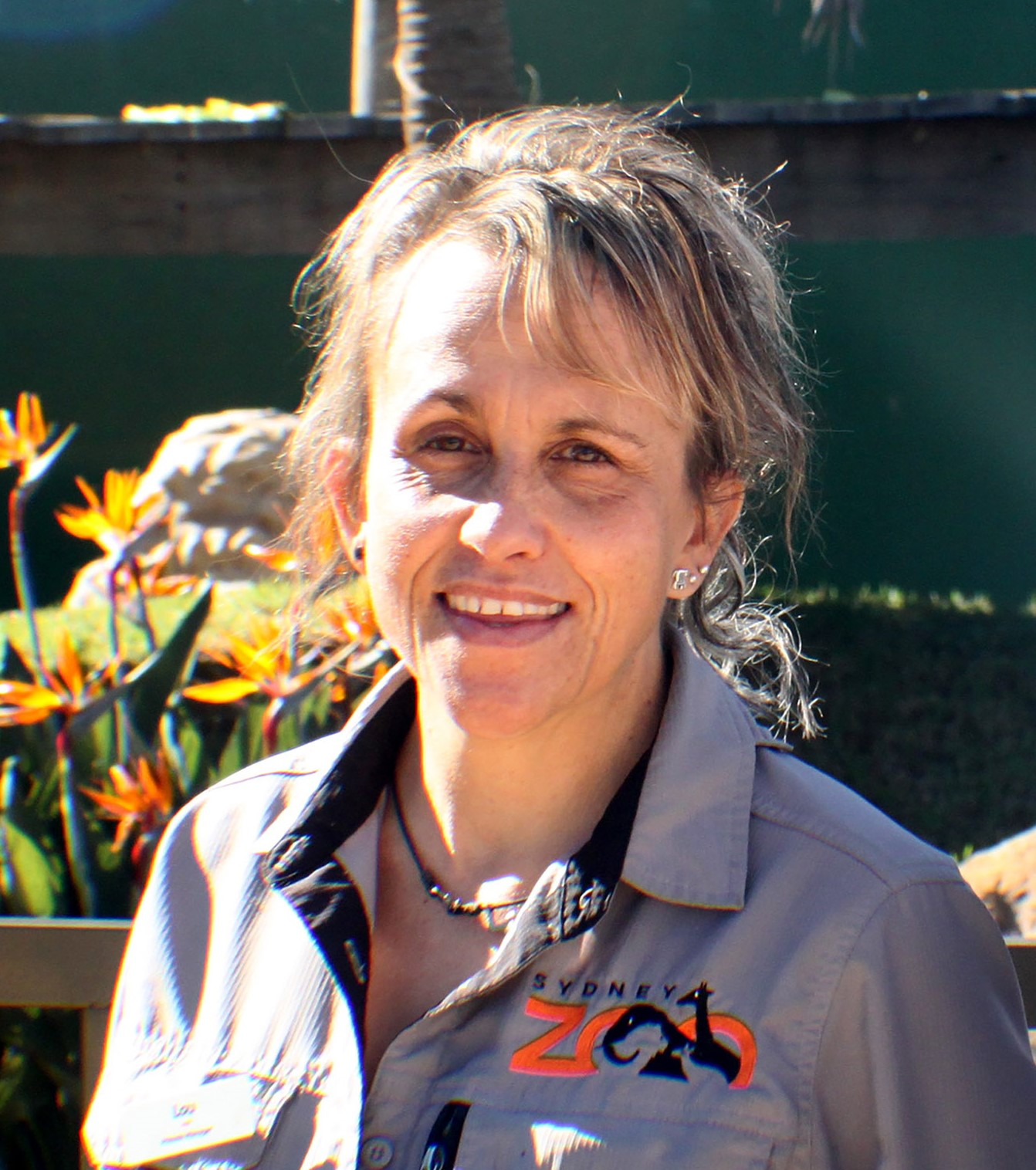
- Born: Louise Ellen Grossfeldt; Sydney, Australia
- Occupations: Zoo keeper, conservationist

Louise (Lou) Grossfeldt (born Louise Ellen Grossfeldt) is a zoo keeper, primate husbandry specialist and conservationist, based in Australia. For over 20 years, she worked with primates at Sydney's Taronga Zoo. In 2015, Lou commenced work as a curator at Mogo Zoo on the New South Wales South Coast. In 2017 she became Mogo Zoo's Manager Life Sciences. In January 2019, she was appointed as the Manager of Primates at Sydney Zoo in Western Sydney.

As part of her husbandry work, Grossfeldt has held positions including Taxon Advisory Group (TAG) Coordinator for New World monkeys and a regional stud book keeper for western lowland gorilla and Black-and-white ruffed lemur.

== Conservation Work ==
Grossfeldt has served as Vice President of Borneo Orangutan Survival Australia. She has worked around the world on primate husbandry and conservation projects, with organisations including Jane Goodall Institute and the Endangered Primate Centre in the Cúc Phương National Park.

In 2013, to honour her ongoing efforts to save the Borneo orangutan, technicians of Borneo Orangutan Survival at Samboja Lestari named an orphaned baby orang after Grossfeldt. Local people believe naming a baby orang after a special person will give the infant extra spirit and a will to live.

== Media and publishing ==
As a member of the Taronga Zoo team, Grossfeldt's work was featured on television programs including Totally Wild, The Project, The Zoo and Wildlife at the Zoo.

In 2013, Grossfeldt and the work of Borneo Orangutan Survival Foundation were featured on 60 Minutes.

In 2015, Grossfeldt co-authored the book Our Primate Family, with writer David Blissett. The foreword for the book was written by primatologist and UN Messenger of Peace Dr Jane Goodall.

Grossfeldt's work is also regularly featured in print media and on radio, especially ABC Radio (Australia) and presenter Richard Glover (radio presenter).

In March 2016, Grossfeldt was featured on an ABC Kid's podcast "Short and Curly", discussing the subject: "should chimps have the same rights as kids?"

In August 2021, Grossfeldt co-authored another book with David Blissett. Amanka Stories - Saving the Last Apes features contributions from conservationists, scientists, caregivers and advocates from around the globe, including Vanessa Woods.

== Teaching and Training ==
For more than a decade, Louise has been training the next generation of zookeepers, conservationists and wildlife carers through her work as a teacher for TAFE NSW. This includes courses such as Certificate III in Wildlife and Exhibited Animal Care. In October 2026, Louise was honoured for her teaching work by winning the 2026 Teacher of the Year, at the NSW TAFE Employee Recognition Awards.
