= Orangutan Diary =

British nature documentary series

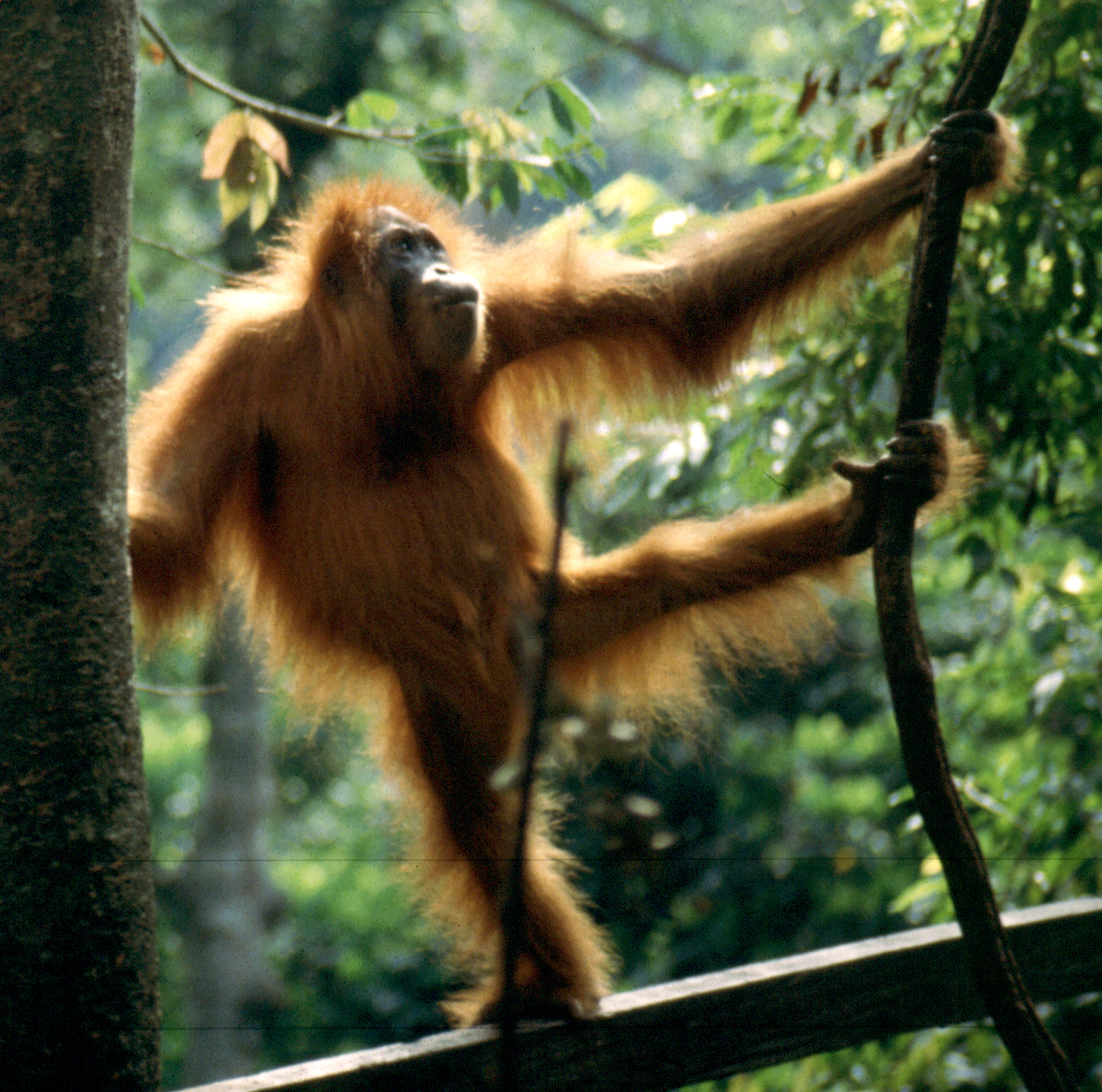
- An orangutan swinging in trees
- Genre: Nature documentary
- Presented by: Michaela Strachan; Steve Leonard
- Starring: Lone Drøscher Nielsen
- Composer: David Poore
- Country of origin: United Kingdom
- Original language: English
- No. of episodes: 11

Production
- Executive producer: Sara Ford
- Producers: Nigel Pope; Simon Bell
- Production location: Borneo
- Running time: Series 1: 30 minutes Series 2: 60 minutes
- Production company: BBC Natural History Unit

Original release
- Network: Series 1: BBC One; Series 2: BBC Two
- Release: 20 April 2007 – 19 April 2009

Related
- Big Cat Diary

Orangutan Diaries is a nature documentary series on the BBC, which follows the lives of Bornean orangutans in the care of Lone Drøscher Nielsen, a member of the Borneo Orangutan Survival (BOS) foundation. The program tries to detail the threat that the orangutans face in day-to-day life. The presenters Michaela Strachan and Steve Leonard follow the careers of the orangutans daily to see what the centre has to deal with.

The centre was founded in 1994, a year after Lone Dröscher Nielsen permanently moved to Borneo. She could see what effect the palm oil plantations were having on the orangutans, so then founded the Nyaru Menteng Orangutan Reintroduction Project, which now is the largest ape rescue project in the world. The first series aired on BBC One in April 2007 and the second series on BBC Two in March 2009. Both series are available as DVDs

== Series one ==
Each episode is 30 minutes long.

- Episode 1: Steve Leonard rescues a tiny orangutan and Michaela visits a forest school.
- Episode 2: Michaela Strachan and Steve Leonard help three orangutan babies learn how to behave like wild animals.
- Episode 3: There is tragedy at the rescue centre when a newly arrived baby fights for its life.
- Episode 4: Steve Leonard has an emotionally charged experience trying to rescue a baby orangutan.
- Episode 5: Steve Leonard rescues a big female who has dislocated her ankle fleeing from her captors.

== Series two ==
The second series also features Dr David Irons who has taken time out from his work at the accident and emergency department of the Galloway Community Hospital in Stranraer, Scotland. His medical expertise with humans, he says, can for the most part be transferred to his work with orangutans: "their anatomy is very similar and their systems work, in most cases, practically the same as ours."

Each episode is 60 minutes long.

- Episode 1: Mama Abut and her baby, found starving, get another chance in the wild heart of Borneo.
- Episode 2: The Rescue Team fights to save a young orangutan held illegally in a tiny crate.
- Episode 3: Sumanto's health takes a turn for the worse, and Angelie returns at last.
- Episode 4: Noddy starts at Forest School and Hercules enjoys a taste of freedom.
- Episode 5: The team release 25 rescued orangutans including Mama Pika and her baby.
- Episode 6: Reviewing the previous episodes and looking again at the plight of the orangutan and the work of the centre.

== Critical reception ==
Writing in The Daily Telegraph, Clive Moragan called Orangutan Diary and "engrossing series", describing it as "soap-style wildlife documentary series". Daily Express said that viewers of the show would be, "touched and amazed in equal measure". Writing in The Independent, Tom Sutcliffe questioned if the show was actually good for the orangutans, stating, "They even blow soap bubbles for the nursery class, with the babies following them through the air with just as much rapt wonder as any human infant. But given that people are the biggest threat to orang-utans in the wild, you couldn't help but wonder whether being taught to fear and distrust us might be more to the point."

== See also ==
- Orangutan Island
- The Disenchanted Forest
- The Burning Season
