= Orangutan Jungle School =

Nature documentary on baby orangutans

- Genre: Nature documentary
- Created by: Judith Curran
- Narrated by: Rebecca Parr
- Countries of origin: United Kingdom, Indonesia
- Original language: English
- No. of seasons: 3
- No. of episodes: 26

Original release
- Network: Channel 4
- Release: 15 August 2018 – present

Orangutan Jungle School is a British documentary television series showcasing the journeys of several orphaned orangutans at the Nyaru Menteng Orangutan Rescue and Rehabilitation Centre in Kalimantan, Indonesia, which is run by the Borneo Orangutan Survival Foundation. The show was produced by NHNZ and Antenna Pictures and distributed by Channel 4 in the United Kingdom and the Smithsonian Channel in the United States. Judith Curran, who created and produced Orangutan Island, wrote and produced the seasons. It premiered on Channel 4 on 15 August 2018, later released in 2019 in the United States. The second season began airing in July 2019, but further seasons were halted due to the COVID-19 pandemic. Following a three-episode miniseries, Becoming Orangutan, a third season was ordered for production and premiered on 17 August 2024.

Similar to Orangutan Island, the show follows multiple baby orangutans who are orphaned after their mothers were killed, often due to their encounters with humans. The babies are rescued and raised together at the "school" in hopes that they can become independent and be reintroduced into their natural habitat. As of 2019, there were 300 orphans in the program, each one assigned to a different group based on age and developmental skills. Groups 1 & 2 are for the youngest orangutans, while Group 3 is for juveniles starting to build confidence. The oldest groups, 4 & 5, train in the canopy to prepare for their eventual reintroduction. Because orangutans learn by example, staff members often demonstrate skills for them, and occasionally set up fake drills and scenarios to test the babies' instincts.

The series has been supported by wildlife non-profit organizations including Orangutan Outreach and Save The Orangutan.

== Series overview ==
Season	Episodes	Originally released	
Season	Episodes	First released	Last released
1	10	August 15, 2018	October 17, 2018
2	10	July 24, 2019	September 25, 2019
3	6	August 17, 2024	TBA

== Episodes ==
=== Season 1 (2018) ===
No.	Title	Original air date
1	"And So It Begins..."	August 15, 2018
The Jungle School, its staff, and its orangutan pupils are introduced, as well as the tragic backstories of some of the orphans. Lessons include opening coconuts, using tools, and searching for food.
2	"Movin' On Up"	August 22, 2018
Valentino, Madara, and Yutris advance to a new group and an infant orangutan is reunited with her mother. The team attempts to relocate a group of rehabilitated orangutans, but one aggressive male attempts to attack staff members.
3	"King of the Jungle"	August 29, 2018
The team is still struggling to capture Kasper after he climbs up a tree. Beni's weight gain causes serious concern among the staff members.
4	"The Misfits"	September 5, 2018
A rare albino orangutan, Alba, arrives at the sanctuary.
5	"A Whole New World"	September 12, 2018
After his time-out punishment, Pujon and Alba attempt to settle their differences.
6	"Weighs and Means"	September 19, 2018
Beni continues to struggle with obesity and Alba is diagnosed with typhoid and sent into quarantine. Rinto leads an orangutan outbreak before bedtime.
7	"Handle with Care"	September 26, 2018
A rescued orphan is suffering from a broken wrist. Beni requires a dentist due to his bad breath. The Group 2 orphans are taught to fear snakes after staff set up a simulation.
8	"Tots, Teens and Tantrums"	October 3, 2018
The juveniles explore and play with water. Two new babies arrive at the centre, one of which is not an orangutan.
9	"Second Chances"	October 10, 2018
Clara and her baby Clarita are now healthy enough to move to the island, but the other residents are reluctant to accept them.
10	"Return to the Wild"	October 17, 2018
Six orangutans are prepared to graduate from the Jungle School's pre-release islands and travel to the wilds of Borneo for their final release. Beni is banned from having treats but discovers a treasure horde.

=== Season 2 (2019) ===
No.	Title	Original air date
1	"The Domino Effect"	July 24, 2019
A new baby is rescued and joins the other orphans. Beni is frustrated with his diet after the Banana Mountain incident.
2	"Dilla's Surprise"	July 31, 2019
Dilla gives birth but struggles to bond with her baby. Alba is released into the wild.
3	"Kesi Turns a Corner"	August 7, 2019
Two orangutans move to a pre-release island. Kesi is bullied by another orangutan. The nursery infants set off on their first day of school.
4	"The Return of the Snake"	August 14, 2019
The snake lesson is back, this time with more dynamic props. Beni and Lala are fed up with their infirmary stay.
5	"Wine's New Friend"	August 21, 2019
Wine meets a young macaque and an unlikely friendship blossoms. A rescued orangutan mother and son arrive on a pre-release island.
6	"Bald is Beautiful"	August 28, 2019
Erik is allowed to join his classmates after recovering from an infection. While exploring the trees, baby Alejandra has an accident.
7	"The Road to Recovery"	September 4, 2019
Alejandra loses sight in one eye following her fall from the tree and begins her rehabilitative journey.
8	"Outbreak!"	September 11, 2019
Tulia and Zalipa have escaped from their pre-release island and a bout of flu makes the rounds. Beni once again attempts to evade his diet plan.
9	"Dilla and Delilah"	September 18, 2019
The escapees are tracked down. Staff members deliberate which orangutans are ready for release.
10	"Born to be Wild"	September 25, 2019
Staff attempt again to reunite Dilla and Delilah. Clara and Clarita prepare for their release but a flash flood disrupts their plans.

=== Season 3 (2024) ===
No.	Title	Original air date
1	"Back to School"	August 17, 2024
2	"Class Reunion"	
3	"Hard Lessons"	
4	"Outbreak Alert"	
5	"Absent Friends"	
6	"Graduation Day"	

== Reception ==
Orangutan Jungle School received positive reviews from critics and audiences alike, particularly because of the series's insight into the developmental stages of orangutans and its message of conservation. The series has enjoyed popularity online, with the first episode receiving over 2 million views on the Smithsonian Channel's YouTube channel.

The Jungle School has also provided the basis for conservation research, specifically how conservation documentaries affect audiences in Western countries and shape action on behalf of the orangutans. For instance, Orangutan Jungle School has provided the Borneo Orangutan Survival Foundation with "poster children" to inspire donations and virtual adoptions of orphans in need for viewers around the world. Beni, in particular, became such a popular figure that the official Orangutan Jungle School website created a Beni "fanpage" featuring video updates of the orangutan, while also promoting a fundraiser for the BOS Foundation.
