= The Disenchanted Forest =

- Directed by: Sarita Siegel
- Written by: Sarita Siegel
- Produced by: Taggart Siegel
- Narrated by: Brooke Shields
- Cinematography: Taggart Siegel
- Edited by: Amy Young and Greg Snider
- Music by: Rob Waugh
- Distributed by: Cube International, Bullfrog Films, Collective Eye Films, The FreeStyle Life
- Release date: 2002
- Running time: 52 minutes
- Language: English

The Disenchanted Forest is a 1999 documentary film that follows endangered orphan orangutans on the island of Borneo as they are rehabilitated and returned to their rainforest home. It centres on the three main Borneo Orangutan Survival Foundation (BOS) projects - Wanariset, Nyaru Menteng and Mawas. It is narrated by Brooke Shields.

== Synopsis ==
In the Bornean rainforest Dr. Anne Russon, primate psychologist, broaches new territory in the attempt to understand orangutan intelligence and psychology. Orangutans, like humans, have "culture." They do not rely solely on animal instinct for survival. Instead a rich and complex society of elders and peers provides the young with critical knowledge that is necessary for their survival in the rainforest. The destruction of the orangutan's habitat to make way for palm oil plantations and the illegal pet-trade threaten the lives of these great apes. When they are taken out of their habitat or when it is destroyed, their culture is disabled.

Dr. Willie Smits, director of the Wanariset Orangutan Reintroduction Project, and his team rescue hundreds of orangutans. Dr. Smits is committed to preserving orangutan habitat and returning captives back into rainforest homes.

Dr Carl Van Schaik, primatologist, discusses the rapidly diminishing opportunity to learn about human evolution as the number of wild orangutans dwindles precariously. He believes questions such as, 'where does our culture come from?' can be answered through the study of orangutan culture and in this context discusses the incredibly fragile culture of the solitary orangutan.

At Wanariset the orphans learn the skills they need to survive in the wild. When they are old and skilled enough they are released into protected rainforest. Without mothers and more knowledgeable elders, strange 'Lord of the Flies' communities evolve in the forest. Eventually the orangutans learn to sustain themselves without human aid.

With the impending extinction of orangutans, opportunities to observe and interact [with] them in their natural setting are reduced.

"Poignant without sentimentality...making us think hard about the meanings and values of culture and nature." Prof. Lorraine Daston, Director, Max Planck Institute for the History of Science

== Awards ==
- Commendation, The Genesis Awards, 2002.
- Finalist, Marion Zentz Best Newcomer Award, Jackson Hole Film Festival, 2001.
- Merit Award for Educational Value & Merit Award for Production Value, International Wildlife Film Festival, Missoula, Montana, 2002.
- 2nd Place EarthVision Environmental Film & Video Competition, 2001.
- Merit Award, Columbus, Ohio, 2002.
- Best Cinematography, Festival du Cinéma de Bruxelles, 2004.

== Festivals ==
- International Primatogical Society Film Festival
- Merit Awards, International Wildlife Film Festival, Missoula
- Finalist, Best Newcomer Award, Jackson Hole Wildlife Film Festival
- Honorable Mention, Columbus International Film & Video Festival
- Commendation, The Genesis Awards
- Best Cinematography, Brussels Film Festival
- 2nd Place, EarthVision Environmental Film and Video Competition
- Mill Valley International Film Festival
- Rocky Mountain Women's Film Festival
- Ekotopfilm, Slovakia
- Hot Springs Documentary Film Festival
- Cork International Film Festival
- Tahoe International Film Festival
- Hazel Wolf Environmental Film Festival
- Breckenridge International Film Festival
- San Diego Asian American Film Festival
- River Run Film Festival
- Temecula Valley Film Festival
- Gaia Film Festival, San Diego
- Sedona Film Festival
- Tangle River Environmental Film Festival
- Artivist Film Festival
- EcoVision Festival, Palermo
- Reel 2 Real International Film Festival for Youth

== See also ==
- Orangutan Island (NHNZ)
- Orangutan Diary (BBC)
- The Burning Season
