= Alba (orangutan) =

Only known orangutan with albinism

Alba is a female Bornean orangutan notable for being the only known orangutan with albinism. After having been illegally kept as a pet, she was rescued and rehabilitated by the Borneo Orangutan Survival (BOS) Foundation before being released into the wild in 2018.

== Discovery ==
Alba was first discovered by Borneo Orangutan Survival in April 2017 in a village in the Kapuas Regency, Central Kalimantan, Indonesia, following tips by local police. It was estimated she was around five years old at the time. She was dehydrated, underweight, and suffering from an infection.

In the 25 years that BOS had been operating at that point, she was the only instance of an albino orangutan they had ever seen, and she is the only known documented case of the condition in orangutans.

Due to her albinism, she has blue eyes and white hair and skin. It also caused her to have weaker than normal vision and hearing, as well as a sensitivity to light.

== Rehabilitation ==
In May 2017, BOS held an online contest to choose a name for the orangutan. Alba was chosen, as it meant "white" in Latin and "dawn" in Spanish.

Upon Alba's recovery, BOS researched into other cases of great apes with albinism, as they were unsure if Alba's disabilities would render her unable to be released. While under the organization's care, she bonded with Kika, another female orangutan.

Alba was featured in the documentary series Orangutan Jungle School.

== Release ==
On December 18th, 2018, after nearly two years of rehabilitation, Alba was released into Bukit Baka Bukit Raya National Park alongside Kika.

Alba was spotted in 2020.

== See also ==
- Snowflake (gorilla) – Only known gorilla with albinism
