= Borneo Orangutan Survival =

Indonesian nonprofit orangutan conservation foundation

Borneo Orangutan Survival Foundation
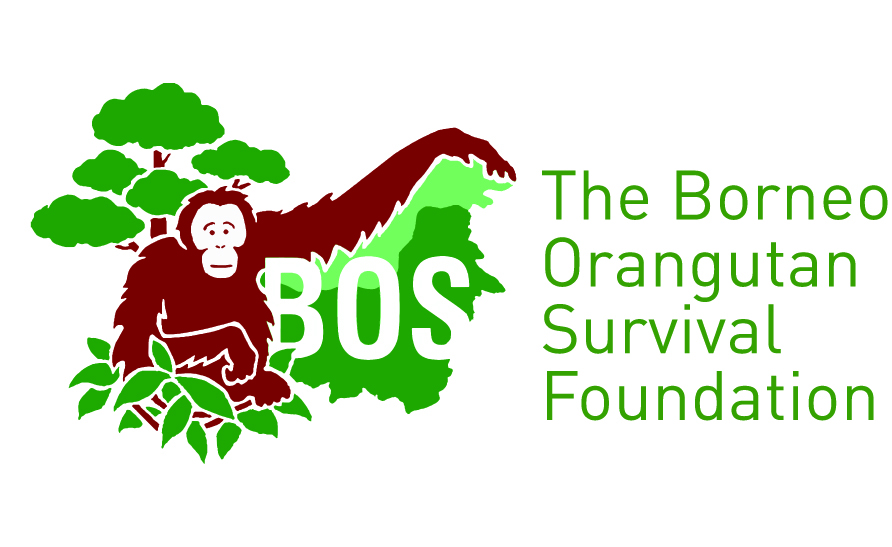
- Founded: 1991
- Founder: Willie Smits and others
- Type: Nonprofit foundation
- Purpose: Environmentalism, conservation
- Location: Indonesia
- Region served: Borneo
- Key people: Jamartin Sihite, CEO
- Website: orangutan.or.id

The Borneo Orangutan Survival (BOS) Foundation is an Indonesian nonprofit non-governmental organization founded by Willie Smits in 1991 and dedicated to the conservation of the endangered Bornean orangutan (Pongo pygmaeus) and its habitat through the involvement of local people. It is audited by an external auditor company and operates under the formal agreement with the Indonesian Ministry of Forestry to conserve and rehabilitate orangutans. The BOS Foundation manages orangutan rescue, rehabilitation and re-introduction programmes in East and Central Kalimantan. With more than 400 orangutans (per July 2021) in its care and employing more than 440 people at a 10 sites BOS Foundation is the biggest non-human primate conservation non-governmental organization worldwide. Nyaru Menteng and Samboja Lestari are the BOS Foundation sites that have received most extensive media coverage. Nyaru Menteng, founded by Lone Drøscher Nielsen, has been the subject of a number of TV series, including Orangutan Diary, Orangutan Island and the series Orangutan Jungle School, airing since 2018.

== History ==
BOS Foundation (initially the "Balikpapan Orangutan Society") was founded in 1991 by the ecologist Dr. Willie Smits, teacher Peter Karsono, Asctha Boestani Tajudin, and Joe Cuthbertson, supported by researchers at the Tropenbos Kalimantan Program and schoolchildren of Balikpapan. Initially the organisation focused only on rescuing and rehabilitating orphaned orangutans at its first centre at Wanariset. By 1998, BOS had already rescued over 500 orangutans in East Kalimantan alone. That same year, BOS finally gained official legal status as a charity in Indonesia and, in 2003, official changed its name to the Borneo Orangutan Survival Foundation.

Its activities expanded outside of East Kalimantan and to Central Kalimantan with the establishment of its second rehabilitation centre at Nyaru Menteng, 28 kilometres outside of Palangka Raya. Their work also expanded into land management and rehabilitation when they entered an agreement with the Indonesian government in 2000 to start work in the Mawas Conservation Area and, in 2001, when they purchased a grass plot at Samboja, 38 kilometres outside of Balikpapan, which became their primary orangutan rehabilitation site in East Kalimantan when operations were transferred from Wanariset in 2006.

In 2009, the BOS Foundation established the company PT Restorasi Habitat Orangutan Indonesia (PT RHOI) in order to purchase an Ecosystem Restoration Concession (ERC). An ERC license for 86,593.65 ha of land in Kutai, East Kalimantan, later named Kehje Sewen, was issued to PT RHOI in 2010. Following this, in 2012, the BOS Foundation began to release rehabilitated orangutans in the Kehje Sewen ERC in Easti Kalimantan and the Bukit Batikap Protection Forest in Central Kalimantan. The BOS Foundation expanded release operations in 2016, with the establishment of release points in the portion of the Bukit Baka Bukit Raya National Park within Central Kalimantan. The organization made global news yet again in April 2017 when it rescued the world's only known albino orangutan, later named Alba.

Since its establishment, it has received increasing recognition in Indonesia and globally, with partner organizations in 7 other countries.

== Orangutan Conservation Status ==
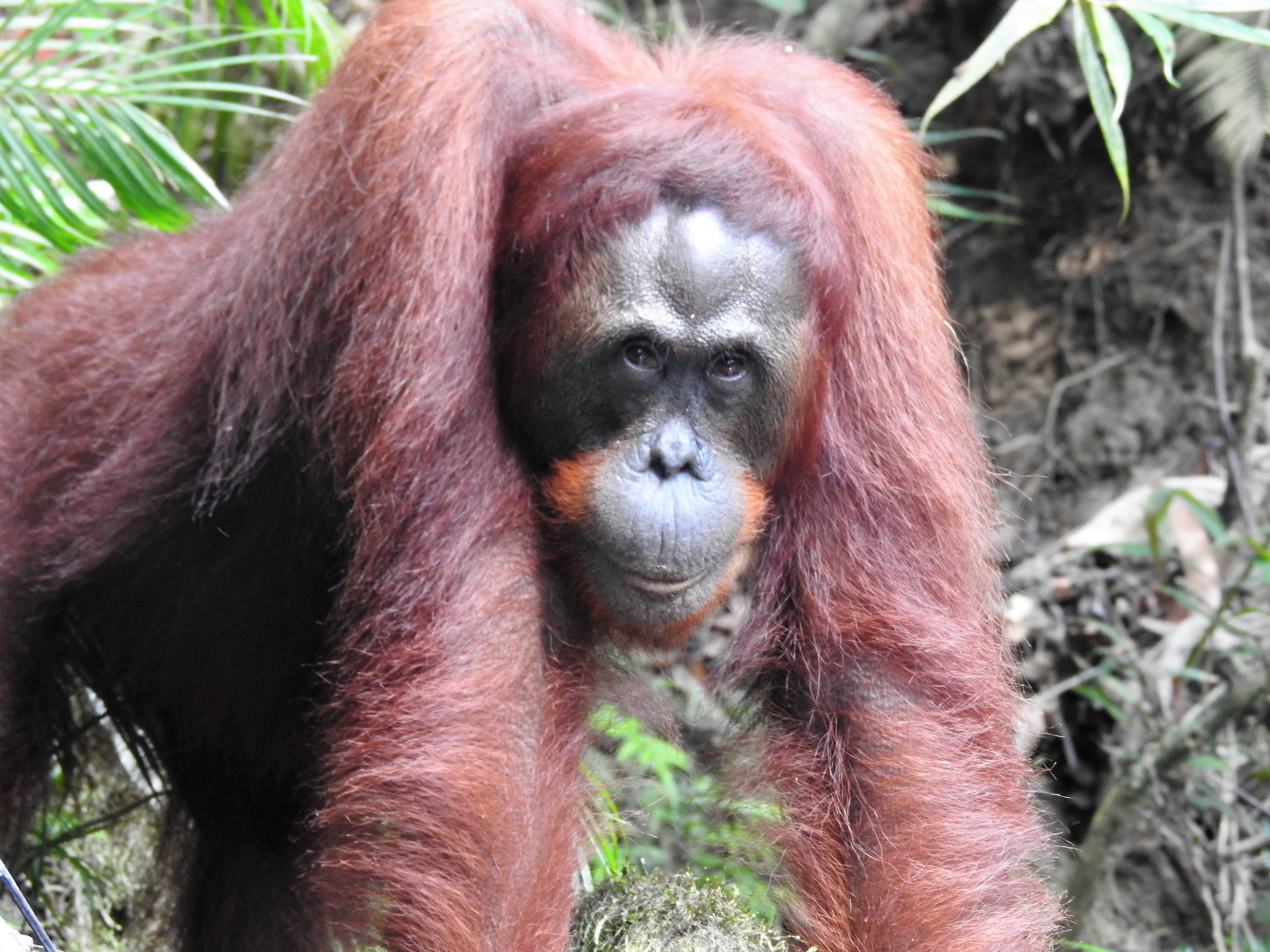
The Bornean orangutan

The Bornean orangutan was up-listed to the status of Critically Endangered in 2016 according to the IUCN Red List of mammals, and is listed on Appendix I of CITES. The total number of Bornean orangutans is estimated to be less than 20 percent of what it was 50 years ago (from a population of about 288,500 in 1973 to a population of about 57,350 in 2016) and this sharp decline has occurred mostly over the past few decades due to human activities and development. Their habitat is so much reduced that they are now only to be found in pockets of remaining rainforest. According to the IUCN, it is expected that in 10 to 30 years orangutans will be extinct if there is no serious effort to overcome the threats that they are facing.

This view is also supported by the United Nations Environment Programme, which states in its report that due to deforestation by illegal logging, fire and the extensive development of oil palm plantations (see Social and environmental impact of palm oil), orangutans are threatened with extinction, and if the current trend continues, they will become extinct.

== Core strategies ==
1. Orangutan reintroduction, through the rescue, rehabilitation, and release of ex-captive orangutans
2. Orangutan and sun bear (Helarctos malayanus) life-long sanctuary care, for individuals with physical or behavioural handicaps that prevent reintroduction
3. Orangutan ecosystem conservation, through the protection of existing forest landscapes and rehabilitation of degraded areas
4. Sustainable community development and education, through outreach, community capacity-building, community empowerment, and public awareness-raising

== Orangutan Rescue and Rehabilitation Centres ==
=== Wanariset ===
Wanariset began as a tropical forest research station near Balikpapan in the Indonesian Province of East Kalimantan and, in 1991, started to be used as an orangutan rescue and rehabilitation centre. After purchasing land in Samboja and transferring all orangutans to their new Samboja Lestari Orangutan Rehabilitation Centre, the BOS Foundation stopped rehabilitation operations at Wanariset in 2006.

=== Nyaru Menteng ===
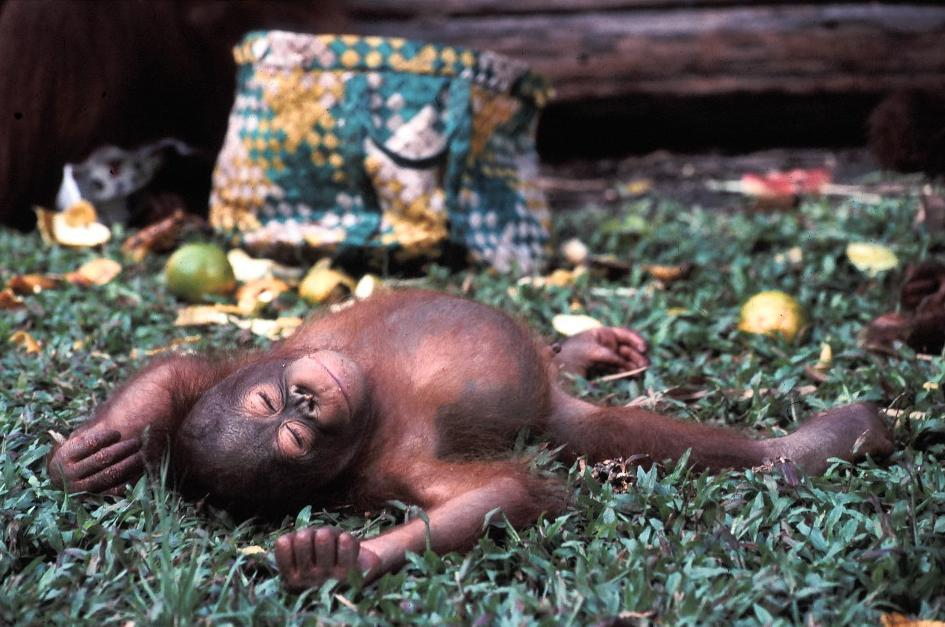
Kevin, one of the young orangutans at Nyaru Menteng, takes a nap.

Nyaru Menteng 2°6′34″S 113°49′14″E is an orangutan rescue and rehabilitation centre 28 km from Palangkaraya in Central Kalimantan. Lone Drøscher Nielsen sought the advice of Smits about the possibility of creating a new project in Central Kalimantan to deal with the swelling numbers of orphaned orangutans. Smits agreed to help and, with the financial backing of the Gibbon Foundation and the BOS Foundation, Drøscher Nielsen founded Nyaru Menteng in 1998. She was able to build the facility under an agreement with the Indonesian Ministry of Forestry, and Nyaru Menteng officially opened its doors to the first dozen orangutans in 1999.

The sanctuary was originally designed to hold up to 100 orphaned orangutans while they go through rehabilitation, but at its peak cared for over 600 individual orangutans. In addition to quarantine cages, medical clinic, and nursery, the sanctuary has a large area of forest in which orangutans could learn the skills needed to live in the wild. Nyaru Menteng quickly became the largest non-human primate rescue project in the world.

Many of these orangutans are only weeks old when they arrive, and all of them are psychologically traumatized. The sanctuary not only saves the orphaned baby orangutans from captivity in human homes and from wildlife tourism, but has developed a process for their gradual re-introduction to the remaining Bornean rainforest.

The centre's running costs are about $1.6m a year. There are about 170 staff: surrogate mothers, animal care technicians, veterinarians, office staff, guards and other workers. Associated with the centre are:

- The Employee Messes which accommodate workers from outside the locality;
- The Pre-Release Islands, Kaja, Palas, and Bangamat, all forested islands in the Rungan River with primitive feeding platforms and jetties;
- The Pre-Release Island, Badak Besar, and the Sanctuary Island, Badak Kecil, all within the Salat Island Cluster and jointly managed with PT SSMS;
- The Information Centre, where local schools visit and from where information campaigns regarding the ecological importance of orangutans and sustainable alternatives are started;
- The Fruit Plantation, "Nyaru Menteng Lestari", 3 ha planted with fruit-bearing trees, such as mango, pineapple and rambutan;
- The release sites at the Bukit Batikap Protection Forest and the Bukit Baka Bukit Raya National Park, used to accommodate orangutans from Nyaru Menteng who have finished the rehabilitation process.

Following several years navigating land permissions to ensure the long-term security of potential release sites, Nyaru Menteng started releasing orangutans back to the forest in February 2012. They have released 190 orangutans in the Bukit Batikap Protection Forest and 163 orangutans in the Bukit Baka Bukit Raya National Park (per July 2021).

=== Samboja Lestari ===
Samboja Lestari 1°2′44″S 116°59′15″E started as a reforestation project in 2001, but opened its doors as an orangutan rescue and rehabilitation centre in 2006, when the BOS Foundation moved their East Kalimantan operations from Wanariset. The rehabilitation centre is located about 38 kilometres northeast of Balikpapan.

Currently, the centre houses over 100 orangutans, a mix of individuals undergoing the rehabilitation process and individuals in lifelong sanctuary care. To accommodate the orangutan rehabilitation process, with the ultimate goal of release into natural rainforests, the centre includes quarantine cages, medical clinic, nursery, forest school area, and small man-made pre-release islands. The "Forest Schools" are areas that provide natural, educational playgrounds for the orangutans in which to learn forest skills. Here the orangutans roam freely but under the supervision of human surrogate mothers and are returned to sleeping cages for the night.

For orangutans unable to be released, the centre houses them on sanctuary islands, in socialisation cages, or in a special care unit, designed to aid in the care of orangutans with chronic disease that requires regular veterinary care. The sanctuary islands were created specifically for the orangutans that cannot return to the wild, but are able to live in almost natural conditions.

The centre's running costs are about $1.1m a year. Associated with the centre are:

- The Employee Messes which accommodate workers from outside the locality;
- The Pre-Release Island, Juq Kehje Swen, a forested island with feeding platforms, staff housing, and veterinary clinic;
- The Sun Bear Sanctuary, which includes over 15 ha of forested enclosures and houses about 70 sun bears;
- The Samboja Lodge, an ecolodge which is open to all tourists and single day visitors who wish to tour the orangutans islands and sun bear sanctuary;
- The replanting areas, which cover about 1,500 ha and is now a mix of secondary forest and new replanting sites;
- The release site at the Kehje Sewen ERC, used to accommodate orangutans from Samboja Lestari who have finished the rehabilitation process.

Following the establishment of PT RHOI by BOS Foundation in 2009 and the acquisition of the Kehje Sewen ERC in 2010, which finally ensured a secure release site for orangutans, Samboja Lestari started releasing orangutans back to the forest in April 2012. They have released 121 orangutans in the Kehje Sewen ERC (per July 2021).

== Forest Conservation, Reforestation and Research ==
=== Samboja Lestari ===
Samboja Lestari 1°2′44″S 116°59′15″E is a reforestation project on nearly 2,000 hectares (7.7 sq mi) of deforested, degraded and burnt land in East Kalimantan. In 2001, BOS started purchasing land near Wanariset. The area it acquired had been deforested by mechanical logging, drought and severe fires and was covered in alang-alang grass (Imperata cylindrica). The aim was to restore the rainforest and provide a safe haven for rehabilitated orangutans while at the same time providing a source of income for local people. The name Samboja Lestari roughly translates as the "everlasting conservation of Samboja". Reforestation and rehabilitation is the core of the project, with hundreds of indigenous species planted. By the middle of 2006 over 740 different tree species had been planted; by 2009 there were 1200 species of trees, 137 species of birds and six species of non-human primates.

Alongside the orangutan reintroduction work, the BOS Foundation has promoted forms of farming that do not involve burning and destroying forests, by switching to agriculture combining rattan, sugar palms and fruits and vegetables. A community has developed that can now support itself on the land. The BOS Foundation believes to achieve sustainable solutions the root social problems must be addressed by empowering local communities to take up livelihood options that are more rewarding than the extractive industries.

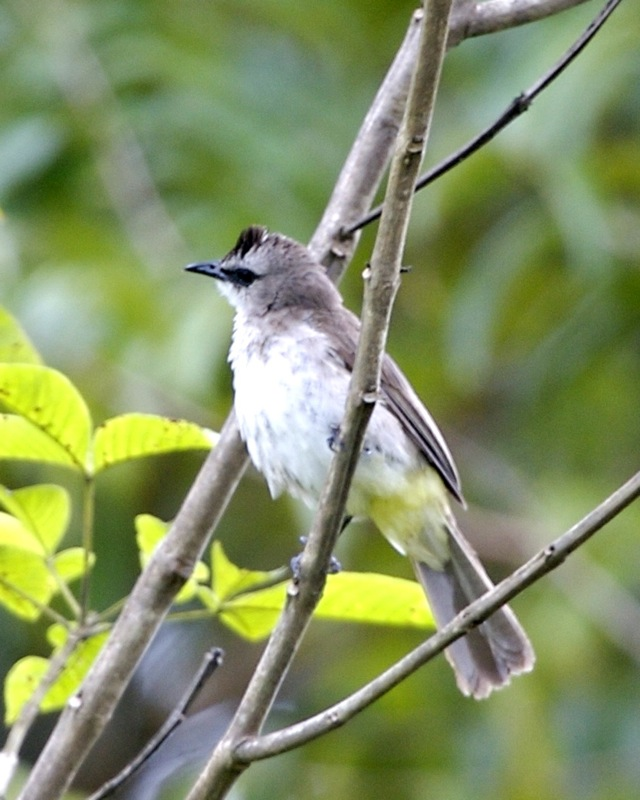
Yellow-vented bulbul, one of the 137 species of birds now found at Samboja Lestari

In his 2009 TED talk, Smits claimed there had been a substantial increase in cloud cover and 30% more rainfall due to the reforestation at Samboja Lestari.

The Samboja Lodge was established to provide accommodation for visitors and volunteers at Samboja. Its design was based upon local architecture and its interior and exterior walls are made of recycled materials.

=== Mawas ===
Mawas 1°59′S 114°39′E is a forest conservation, reforestation and research area in Central Kalimantan. In September 2003, the provincial parliament in Central Kalimantan approved a new land use plan that designates 309,000 hectares (1,200 sq mi) in the Mawas area to be managed by the BOS Foundation for conservation. The BOS Foundation is currently working in an area of about 280,000 hectares (1,100 sq mi) within the ex-Mega Rice Project area.

Starting in 2007, the BOS Foundation was involved in the development of the Orangutan Conservation Strategy and Action Plan and has continued to help implementing the plan ever since. With international support and donations from companies like Weleda and Werner & Mertz, the Mawas project has grown to play an important role in the conservation of the Bornean orangutans and their habitat. It is the largest single area of land managed by the BOS Foundation. The main aim is to protect the fast-disappearing peat lands through collaboration with the Central and Local Governments and the local communities. The Mawas area is home to one of the last tracts of forest supporting wild orangutans. An estimated 2,550 wild orangutans are found in this area. Mawas is also important for its biodiversity and its geological conditions, including a double peat dome, which make it a storage house of giga-tonnes of sequestered carbon. Over a period of 8,000 years, decaying plant matter from the swamp forests has built up 13 – 15 metre high domes of peat.

The BOS Foundation has initiated a forest conservation project with the objectives of:

- conserving peat swamp forest area including reforesting degraded areas;
- preserving the bio-diversity of the area;
- providing global greenhouse gas (GHG) benefits;
- providing access to programs such as health and education;
- improving incomes and building capacity and economic prosperity in local communities;
- assisting communities in learning technical skills including aquaculture, rice cultivation, agro-forestry and farm development;
- assisting local independence and self-sustaining livelihoods;
- providing education to children on the environment and conservation, by visiting schools;
- providing community awareness programs as well as co-operative conservation programs;
- promoting long-term research of orangutan behaviour and peatland ecology.

The area has been important for research activities since the founding of the Tuanan Research Station in Kapuas in 2002 by the BOS Foundation and the University of Zurich of Switzerland. The research activities there continue through today, but is now operated through a collaboration of the BOS Foundation with Universitas Nasional (UNAS) of Indonesia and Rutgers University of the United States. The research station was established through extensive consultation with all local people and institutions and the employment of local labour. Its purpose is to provide a year-round base for scientists tracking and observing the wild orangutan population and studying peatland ecology. The BOS Foundation is involved in patrolling and monitoring the area for illegal activities via water and land and supporting law enforcement by providing guidance and legal awareness programs to the community and government.

=== Kehje Sewen ===
On 15 July 2010, at an international meeting on orangutan conservation in Bali, the Indonesian forestry ministry secretary general, Boen Purnama, announced that the Indonesian government will grant a permit to the BOS Foundation to reserve thousands of hectares of forest formerly used for logging for the release of around 200 orangutans in the Kutai area in East Kalimantan. In response, the BOS Foundation set up a company, PT Orangutan Habitat Restoration Indonesia (RHOI), to manage 86,593.65 hectares of former timber concession area in the East Kutai district, later named Kehje Sewen (home for orangutans in the local Wehea Dayak language), to be the new reintroduction site for rehabilitated orangutans. The then BOS Foundation chairman, Togu Manurung, announced the aim to start gradual releases by April 2011.

== Documentaries ==
The work of the Borneo Orangutan Survival Foundation has appeared in a number of documentaries. The Disenchanted Forest was an award-winning 1999 film that follows orphan orangutans as they are rehabilitated and returned to their rainforest home. It centres on three BOS projects – Wanariset, Nyaru Menteng and Mawas. The Burning Season is a 2008 documentary about the burning of rainforests in Indonesia which featured Lone Drøscher Nielsen. The orangutans of Nyaru Menteng were then followed in the two series of Orangutan Diary produced by the BBC and also, as they were reintroduced to a semi-wild habitat in the form of forested pre-release islands, in the 23 programmes of the Orangutan Island series, produced by NHNZ. In 2013, Harrison Ford visited Nyaru Menteng for the filming of episode one of Years of Living Dangerously to show the devastating impacts of the global demand for palm oil and other agricultural products. BBC returned to Nyaru Menteng again in 2013 to follow the release of four orangutans into the Bukit Batikap Protection Forest for a special episode of Natural World, entitled "Orangutans: The Great Ape Escape".

Most recently, BOS Foundation activities at Nyaru Menteng, Samboja Lestari, and in the Bukit Baka Bukit Raya National Park were featured in two series of Orangutan Jungle School, produced by NHNZ. The full series aired on Sky Nature, Sat. 1 Gold, StarHub, Stan., Iqiyi, Smithsonian Channel, MyTV Super, Nexmedia, Vidio, Canal+, Digical, 4gTV, GtTV, TrueVisions, Zuku, VTVCab, Viettel, Love Nature, First Media, MediaNet, and Choice TV. In the United Kingdom, Channel 4 instead aired three-part specials in lieu of the full series. The show received positive reviews from The Telegraph and The Times.
