= Orangutan Island =

- Genre: Nature, documentary, drama
- Created by: Judith Curran
- Narrated by: Rodd Houston
- Country of origin: United States
- Original language: English
- No. of seasons: 2
- No. of episodes: 26

Production
- Executive producer: Martha Ripp
- Producer: Judith Curran
- Production location: Borneo
- Cinematography: Season 2 - Alex Hubert
- Running time: 30 minutes

Original release
- Network: Animal Planet
- Release: November 2, 2007 – March 17, 2009

Orangutan Island is an American documentary television series, in the style of the earlier series Meerkat Manor, that blends more traditional documentary filming with dramatic narration. The series was produced by NHNZ with creator Judith Curran also acting as the series producer. Animal Planet's Martha Ripp is the executive producer of the series, and Lone Drøscher Nielsen of the Borneo Orangutan Survival Foundation, the founder, and manager of the Nyaru Menteng Orangutan Reintroduction Project, regularly appears with the orangutans in the show. The series premiered on Animal Planet on November 2, 2007, with new episodes airing Friday nights. A second season began airing in November 2008.

The show focuses on a group of orphaned orangutans at the Nyaru Menteng Orangutan Rescue and Rehabilitation Center that are raised to go against their normally independent nature and instead cooperate and live together in a society so they can be left to live wild on their protected island.

== Production details ==
Anne Russon, a psychologist who has conducted extensive research in primate intelligence is acting as a scientific adviser for the series. Lone Drøscher Nielsen is the founder and project manager of the Nyaru Menteng Orangutan Rescue and Reintroduction Center and regularly appears in the show interacting with and caring for the orangutan orphans.

== Episodes ==
=== Season 1: 2007-2008 ===
| No. | Title | Original release date |
|---|---|---|
| 1 | "New Beginnings" | November 2, 2007 |
The new orangutans are introduced to their rescue center.
| 2 | "The Intruder" | November 9, 2007 |
Hamlet, an older, larger male from a neighboring island, comes to the island and attempts to kidnap Jasmine, although his attempts are foiled by the bandit boys, Saturnus, and Daisy.
| 3 | "Lost" | November 16, 2007 |
The wet season arrives and Oyoy and Mogok become independent. Mogok successfully survives 4 days alone, but Oyoy dies when he falls into the growing river.
| 4 | "Lessons Learned, Lessons Lost" | November 30, 2007 |
The bandit boys accidentally drop much of their food off the feeding platform into the flooded waters, and use the help of Hamlet to retrieve their food from the waters. Jordan attempts to drink a bottle of engine oil left on a boat, which would've killed him had the Teknisi not found him in time, and Cha cha puts herself at risk by grabbing a highly venomous coral snake.
| 5 | "Break Out" | December 7, 2007 |
Chen Chen, Cha Cha, and Daisy discover that the electric fence separating Orangutan Island, and neighboring Palas Island is not functioning properly, and two Palas Island males get across. They are rounded up by the Teknisi, but Cha Cha is missing.
| 6 | "Growing Pains" | December 14, 2007 |
All of the orangutans are inspected for the first time by Lone and their vet, Tim. Milo bullies Bonita, and Cha Cha is found all alone in the forest.
| 7 | "Orangutan 911" | December 21, 2007 |
Donald catches a mysterious disease that spreads throughout the island.
| 8 | "Eaten Alive" | January 11, 2008 |
An invisible menace is threatening Orangutan Island, and at the Nyaru Menteng Clinic veterinarians work around the clock to unravel the mystery behind Donald, Togar, Mercury and Bonita's illness. Back on the island, fears of an epidemic worsen when Bertha is found to have an abscess.
| 9 | "House of Cards" | January 18, 2008 |
Jordan, the main outsider of the group, becomes more active with Chen Chen and seems to be good at climbing trees. Alibaba finds a jackfruit, and it is shared. Nadi however, refuses to share, causing Daisy to fight her and prevent her from using the feeding platforms. Nadi wanders off and is bitten by a pit viper.
| 10 | "River's Rewards" | January 25, 2008 |
Nadi is treated for her snakebite. She recovers and is sent back to the island. Alibaba raids the fish traps that the Teknisi set up, and earns a higher place in the group's social status.
| 11 | "Rumble in the Jungle" | February 1, 2008 |
Most of the orangutans sleep on the forest floor, but it is not safe and they are vulnerable to predators. So Lone tries to build a platform in the tree canopy, 50 feet off the ground, to encourage them to stay in the trees.
| 12 | "Who Rules?" | February 8, 2008 |
Lone's risky plan to encourage the orphaned orangutans to spend more time in the treetops has a fatal flaw. But she isn't going to be discouraged and works on a new solution. At the same time, the island is simmering with tension over who will fill the leadership void until the unexpected return of Hamlet. But his reappearance doesn't immediately resolve the issue as another showdown begins.
| 13 | "Many Happy Returns" | February 15, 2008 |
For the anniversary of the island, Lone comes for a visit.

=== Season 2: 2008-2009 ===
| No. | Title | Original release date |
|---|---|---|
| 1 | "Cheating Extinction" | November 16, 2008 |
New orangutan orphans just arrived at Nyaru Menteng Rescue Center.
| 2 | "An Animal In Paradise" | November 16, 2008 |
It's been 18 months since Forest School class 103 arrived on the island, and 32 of the original 35 orangutans remain, life on the island is still unpredictable. In this episode, two travelers must put their lives at risk to help the orangutans, revealing the greatest surprise yet on Orangutan Island.
| 3 | "No Borders" | November 23, 2008 |
There are new arrivals on the island--mother Kiki and her nine-month-old son, Hardi, who came from bordering Palas Island. Although there is an electric fence dividing the two islands, Project Manager Lone Droscher-Nielson quickly realizes that it doesn’t work when Kiki and her son arrive unscathed.
| 4 | "Sink Or Swim" | November 23, 2008 |
The bold open border experiment continues, but will the weakest of the orphans end up paying too heavy a price? A wily Palas Island adventurer is already looking to settle an old score.
| 5 | "Fight Club" | November 30, 2008 |
Anarchy rules as a vicious battle erupts to fill the power vacuum left by Hamlet. The stakes are high as tenacious contender Reno vies for dominance, but now he must compete with the older, menacing Palas Island males.
| 6 | "Kindred Spirits" | November 30, 2008 |
There's calm since Hamlet's return, but it is mostly an uneasy peace between the Orangutan and Palas Island orangutans.
| 7 | "We Are Family" | February 8, 2009 |
Exhausted from her motherly duties with baby Hardi, Kiki will never get a break unless she decides to let the other females do the unthinkable – babysit! Meanwhile, vulnerable Mangis is put to the test.
| 8 | "Where There Is Smoke" | February 8, 2009 |
Reno's attempt to find his place in the society of Orangutan Island turns play into disaster, especially for Chen Chen. Meanwhile, Saturnus' naughty act sheds light on the current societal hierarchy.
| 9 | "Double Edged Sword" | February 15, 2009 |
Hamlet takes a walk on the wild side, which could compromise his entire future. Meanwhile, a plump Chen Chen returns from the clinic fully mended but with no one to greet him.
| 10 | "Teen Angst" | February 15, 2009 |
Lone wrestles with how to ensure Bonita's health without devastating the emotional health of her two-year-old foster daughter, Randang. Meanwhile, hormone-fueled Palas Island males go on a rampage, targeting mom Kiki.
| 11 | "Chain Reaction" | February 22, 2009 |
After an accident while play-fighting, Jordan faces amputation if an x-ray machine doesn't arrive in time. Later, Jupiter's attempt to become the feminine counterpart to Chen Chen's "demolition man" sets off a chain reaction with Bonita-the unintended and unsuspecting victim.
| 12 | "A Walk On The Wild Side" | February 22, 2009 |
Hamlet's dominance is suddenly in question when Lone learns that the vulnerable Bonita has left the island sanctuary after her run-in. It is a race against time to find Bonita before it is too late. The youngster is not mature enough to live in the wild alone and poachers are a constant threat.
| 13 | "Moving On" | March 1, 2009 |
Lone is negotiating with the government for a bigger island in order to alleviate overcrowding at Nyaru Menteng. The new island will force its inhabitants such as Cha Cha, Saturnus, Jordan, and Daisy to adapt to the wild and survive in rougher terrain.

== See also ==
- Orangutan Diary
- The Disenchanted Forest
- The Burning Season
