= Lone Drøscher Nielsen =

Danish conservationist

- Born: 4 November 1964 (age 61); Aabybro, Denmark
- Known for: Study and protection of orangutan, conservation, re-introduction to wild
- Scientific career
- Fields: Primatologist, Conservationist
- Workplaces: Borneo Orangutan Survival

Lone Drøscher Nielsen (born 1964) is a Danish wildlife conservationist who established the Nyaru Menteng Orangutan Reintroduction Project in Kalimantan, Borneo, Indonesia in 1998.

== Early life and work ==
She was born and grew up in Aabybro, Denmark. She encountered her first orangutan while volunteering as a fourteen-year-old at Aalborg Zoo. Later, when she was working as a flight attendant for Scandinavian Airlines, she volunteered for a month-long project on the Indonesian island of Borneo, and here she came into contact with orangutans again. From 1996 until 2010, Drøscher Nielsen lived in Borneo to help save the Bornean orangutan from extinction due to loss of its natural habitat due to logging and oil palm plantations.

== Nyaru Menteng ==
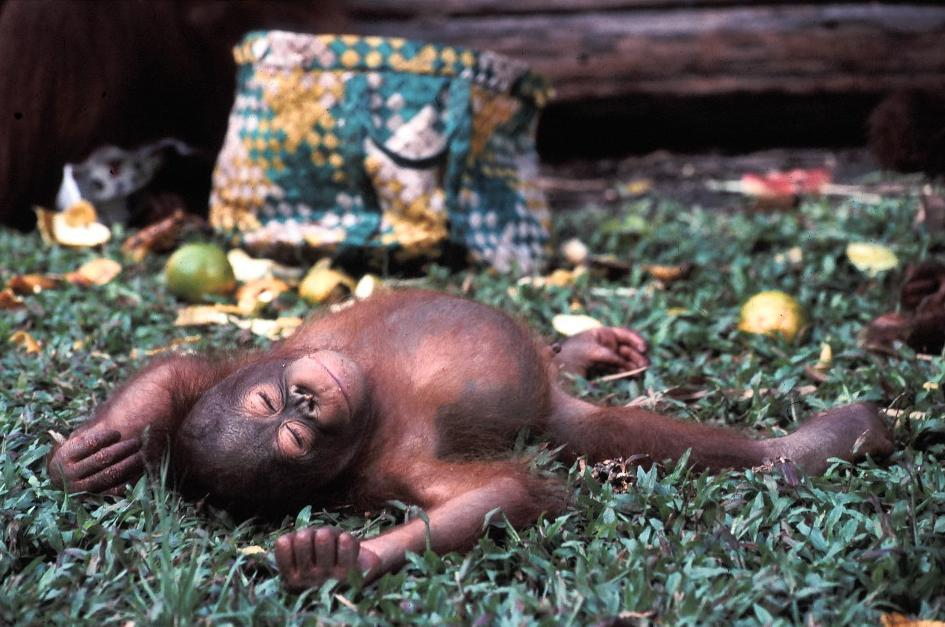
Kevin, one of the young orangutans at Nyaru Menteng, takes a nap.

Drøscher Nielsen sought the advice of Dr Willie Smits of the Borneo Orangutan Survival (BOS) Foundation about the possibility of creating a new project in Central Kalimantan to deal with the swelling numbers of orphaned orangutans. Smits agreed to help, and with the financial backing of the Gibbon Foundation and BOS Indonesia, Lone founded the Nyaru Menteng Orangutan Reintroduction Project in 1998. She was able to build the facility under an agreement with the Indonesian Ministry of Forestry, and Nyaru Menteng officially opened its doors to the first dozen orangutans in 1999.

The sanctuary was designed to hold up to 100 orphaned orangutans while they go through rehabilitation. In addition to quarantine cages, medical clinic, and nursery, the sanctuary had a large area of forest in which orangutans could learn the skills needed to live in the wild. Nyaru Menteng quickly became the largest primate rescue project in the world, with over 600 orphaned and displaced orangutans in its care in 2009 and a staff of 200.

Many of these orangutans are only weeks old when they arrive, and all of them are psychologically traumatized. The sanctuary not only saves the mostly orphaned baby orangutans from the local farmers and illegal pet-traders, but has developed a process for their gradual re-introduction to the remaining Borneo rainforest.

Babies and young orangutans brought to the centre are cared for 24 hours a day by a team of "babysitters". As they grow and learn they are then taken to "forest school" where they learn, still with staff present, to climb trees and survive in the forest. At the age of about eight years, they are relocated in groups of around 25 to a neighbouring island for the first stage in their release.

Drøscher Nielsen lived near the Nyaru Menteng Rescue Center, Kalimantan, Borneo, managing a specialized clinic of veterinarians and paramedics as well as a workforce of local Indonesians who work as babysitters caring for the orphaned orangutans in the center. In 2010 she was forced to leave Borneo and returned to Europe due to a life-threatening illness. She worked as a Senior Expert Advisor at the international organisation Save the Orangutan from her base in Wales. In July 2018, Drøscher Nielsen released a statement in response to comments made about her conduct by her former employer, Save the Orangutan, explaining her move to the Orangutan Land Trust.

== Television and film ==
Nyaru Menteng has been featured on Animal Planet's award-winning series Orangutan Island, the BBC's Orangutan diary, Saving Planet Earth and Growing Up... Orangutan (BBC/Discovery Channel). Drøscher Nielsen starred in the 2008 Australian documentary-drama, The Burning Season.

== Writing ==
In 2006 Drøscher Nielsen published From Forest Kindergarten to Freedom with Pia Lykke Bertelsen in English, German and Danish. The book is a photographic story that follows two baby orangutans, Emma and Emil, growing up in the rehabilitation centre and eventually being released into the wild, with photos by Humphrey Watchman, Steve Leonard, Sam Gracey, Lone Drøscher Nielsen and Danielle Brandt.
