= Samboja Lestari =

Indonesian animal rescue centre and rainforest restoration project

Coordinates: 1°2′44″S 116°59′15″E

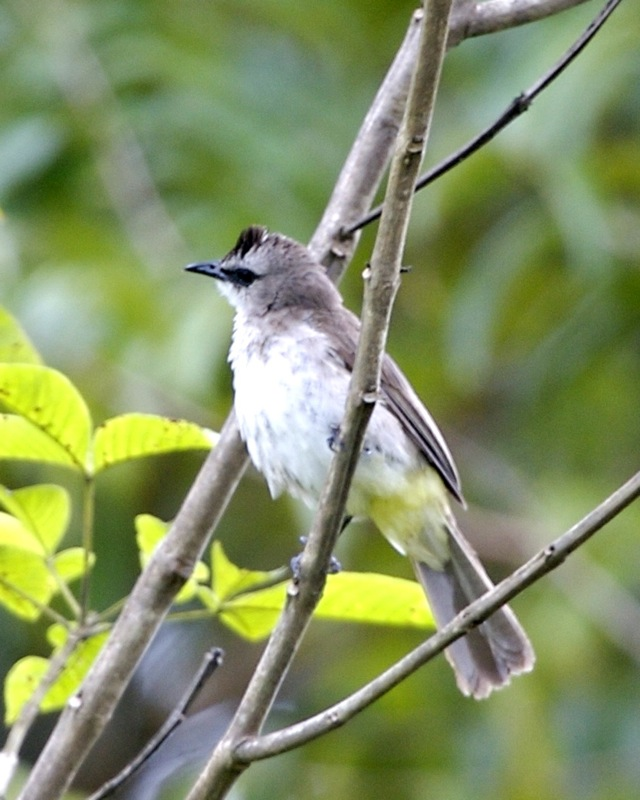
Yellow-vented bulbul, one of the 137 species of birds now found at Samboja Lestari

Samboja Lestari is a Bornean orangutan (Pongo pygmaeus) rescue and rehabilitation centre, tropical rainforest restoration project, sun bear sanctuary, and eco-lodge located in the district of Samboja in Kutai Kartanegara Regency, East Kalimantan, Indonesia, owned and operated by the Borneo Orangutan Survival (BOS) Foundation. According to its founder, Willie Smits, Samboja Lestari uses the principles of People, Planet, Profit, attempting to provide incomes for local people using conservation. It is located about 38 kilometres from Balikpapan.

The project covers about 1,800 hectares (6.9 sq mi) of previously deforested land. In 2001, the BOS Foundation began purchasing land near Samboja that, like much of the deforested land in Borneo, was covered in alang-alang grass (Imperata cylindrica). The name Samboja Lestari roughly translates as the 'Samboja Forever'. Reforestation and orangutan rehabilitation are at the core of this project, which is considered controversial because it is more expensive to replant a forest instead of just protecting remaining forest. According to the BOS Foundation, by 2006 over 740 different tree species had been planted; by 2009 there were 1200 species of trees, 137 species of birds and six species of non-human primates.

== Activities ==
In 2001 BOS Foundation began purchasing land near Samboja. It insured that the purchase of each plot of land was in accordance with regulations and documented by letter, official seal and security copy.

Conditions were not favourable: aside from the land degradation, the soil itself was not promising - predominantly clay, with hard plinthite clods. Not far beneath the surface there were coal seams that in the dry periods opened up to the air and caught fire. Land prices were rising and there was not enough funding available to buy enough normal rainforest land. Forestry experts are sceptical, once the primary rainforest is cut and burned down, it will take centuries to return.

=== Tree planting ===
The tree nursery was started, including some seeds that had been recovered from orangutan faeces. Pioneer trees planted were the drought-resistant sungkai (Peronema canescens) and legumes such as Acacia mangium. Smits drew on his background in microbiology and his doctoral dissertation on mycorrhiza, making enormous quantities of compost for tree seedlings. Along with organic waste, he mixed in sawdust, fruit remnants from the orangutan cages, manure from cattle and chickens scavenged from his other projects in Kalimantan and a microbiological agent made from sugar and cow urine. In the years since the start of the replanting project, BOS Foundation has established hundreds of hectares of secondary forest and continues to replant on degraded and burned lands every year.

=== Orangutan rehabilitation ===
Securing the future of the Bornean orangutan was the central concern of the project. Smits' Orangutan Rehabilitation Project at Wanariset was moved to Samboja. "Forest schools" were established, areas that provide natural playgrounds for the orangutans in which to learn forest skills. Here the orangutans roam somewhat freely but under the supervision of human "surrogate mothers" and are returned to sleeping cages for the night. "Orangutan islands" were created where the orangutans to further hone survival skills before being released into the wild.

=== Orangutan sanctuary ===
With a large population of orangutans at Samboja Lestari unable to be reintroduced into the wild due to physical disability, chronic illness, abnormal behaviours, or a lack of survival skills, the BOS Foundation has also developed facilities specifically to provide lifelong sanctuary care for these individuals. These facilities vary from sanctuary islands for orangutans who are not severely disabled and capable of living in almost natural conditions with minimal human support, to a Special Care Unit for those who need frequently and regular veterinary support.

=== Sun bear sanctuary ===
At the request of the Indonesian Government, Samboja Lestari became home to over 70 sun bears, confiscated from the illegal pet trade or rescued from deforested areas.

As there is no standardised, proven method of reintroduction for sun bears, the BOS Foundation provides instead lifetime sanctuary care in semi-wild conditions. The sanctuary includes a 15 hectares (0.058 sq mi) area put aside for the bears including a 15 fully forested enclosures with attached dens, varying in size from 0.35 hectares (0.0014 sq mi) to 2.29 hectares (0.0088 sq mi).

=== Ecotourism ===
The Samboja Lodge was established to provide accommodation for visitors and volunteers at Samboja. Its design was based upon local architecture and its interior and exterior walls are made of recycled materials. Visitors to the lodge, whether staying overnight or just for a single day, are educated in the importance of orangutan and ecosystem conservation by guided tours of the neighboring orangutan sanctuary islands and sun bear sanctuary. The profits from overnight and day guests help to fund the conservation activities undertaken by the BOS Foundation at Samboja Lestari.

== Impact ==
Although there is not yet a return to the full biodiversity of the rainforests of Borneo, a secondary forest is growing which it is hoped will eventually become a safe haven for all of Borneo's biodiversity. According to Smits in his 2009 TED talk in addition to bird species such as hornbills, 30 species of reptiles, porcupines, pangolins, mouse deer and many other animal species have been recorded.

The orangutan rehabilitation program at Samboja Lestari started selecting orangutans with adequate natural behaviours to be released into the Kehje Sewen Ecosystem Restoration Concession, owned by PT Rehabilitasi Orangutan Borneo, which is also operated by the BOS Foundation. In April 2012, They released their first 3 orangutans from Samboja Lestari in the Kehje Sewen ERC. Today, 121 orangutans from Samboja Lestari have been released back into the wild (per July 2021).

== Praise ==
Amory Lovins, chief scientist at Colorado's Rocky Mountain Institute claimed Samboja Lestari was possibly "the finest example of ecological and economic restoration in the tropics".

== Criticism ==
The costs of the Samboja Lestari project in 2020 were reported at approximately $1.05 million, including all activities from reforestation and fire prevention to orangutan rehabilitation and sanctuary. This operating cost is higher than the cost of protecting existing rainforest per hectare; for comparison, the Nature Conservancy together with the Indonesian government in partnerships with timber companies have been able to protect more forest and orangutans at a fraction of the cost in the same period. Erik Meijaard, conservation scientist and ecologist at the Nature Conservancy who once worked for Smits, says that it remains unclear whether Samboja Lestari is a good idea, and that the success will ultimately depend on the extent to which it can improve community livelihoods and achieve long-term financial stability and sustainability: "that question remains unanswered, and will remain so for a few years, because that is the kind of time such projects need to be evaluated".

== See also ==
- Borneo Orangutan Survival
- Willie Smits
