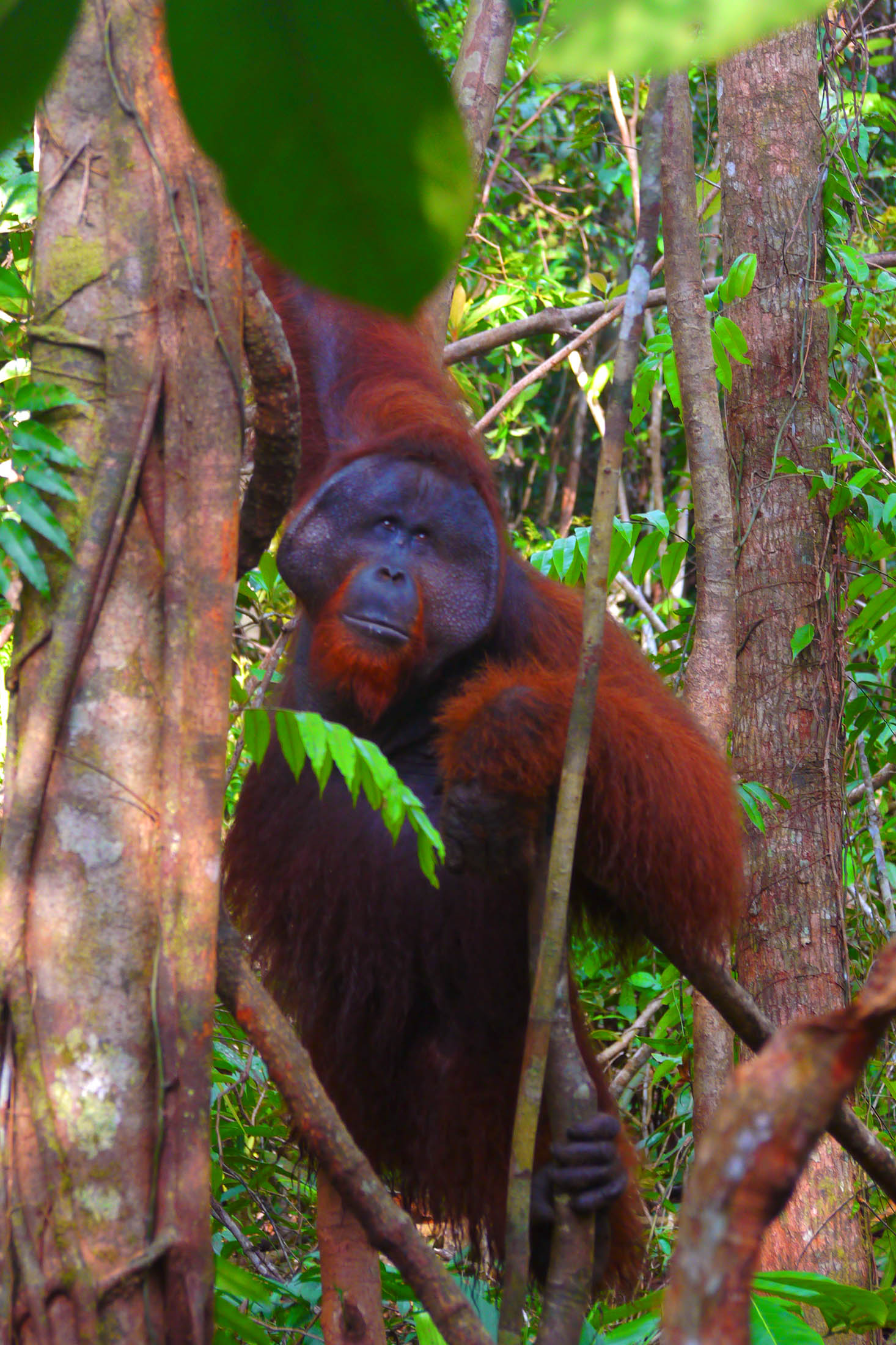
- Male
- Female with infant Both photographed in Tanjung Puting National Park

Conservation status
- Critically Endangered (IUCN 3.1)
- CITES Appendix I

Scientific classification
- Kingdom: Animalia
- Phylum: Chordata
- Class: Mammalia
- Order: Primates
- Superfamily: Hominoidea
- Family: Hominidae
- Genus: Pongo
- Species: P. pygmaeus

Binomial name
- Pongo pygmaeus (Linnaeus, 1760)

Subspecies
- P. p. morio; P. p. pygmaeus; P. p. wurmbii
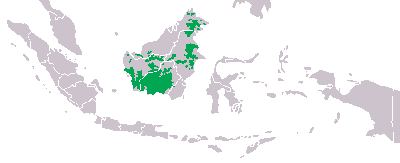
- Distribution of Pongo pygmaeus in Borneo

Synonyms
- P. agris (Schreber, 1799); P. batangtuensis (Selenka, 1896); P. borneensis Röhrer-Ertl, 1983; P. borneo (Lacépède, 1799); P. brookei (Blyth, 1853); P. curtus (Blyth, 1855); P. dadappensis (Selenka, 1896); P. genepaiensis (Selenka, 1896); P. landakkensis (Selenka, 1896); P. morio (Owen, 1837); P. owenii (Blyth, 1853); P. rantaiensis (Selenka, 1896); P. rufus (Lesson, 1840); P. satyrus (Linnaeus, 1766) [in part] P. skalauensis (Selenka, 1896)> P. sumatranus (Mayer, 1856); P. tuakensis (Selenka, 1896); P. wallichii (Gray, 1871); P. wurmbii (Tiedemann, 1808)

= Bornean orangutan =

Species of ape

The Bornean orangutan (Pongo pygmaeus) is an orangutan species endemic to the island of Borneo. It belongs to the only genus of great apes native to Asia and is the largest of the three Pongo species. It has a coarse, reddish coat and up to 1.5 m (5 ft) long arms. It is sexually dimorphic — males are larger than females and develop large cheek pads (flanges).

The Bornean orangutan inhabits Borneo lowland rain forests and Borneo montane rain forests up to an elevation of 1,500 m (5,000 ft). Its diet includes fruits, seeds, flowers, bird eggs, sap and vines. It is highly intelligent, displaying tool use and distinct cultural patterns. It is listed as Critically Endangered, with deforestation, palm oil plantations, and hunting posing a serious threat to its survival. It is scheduled as a "totally protected animal" under Sarawak state law through the 1998 Wild Life Protection Ordinance.

== Taxonomy ==
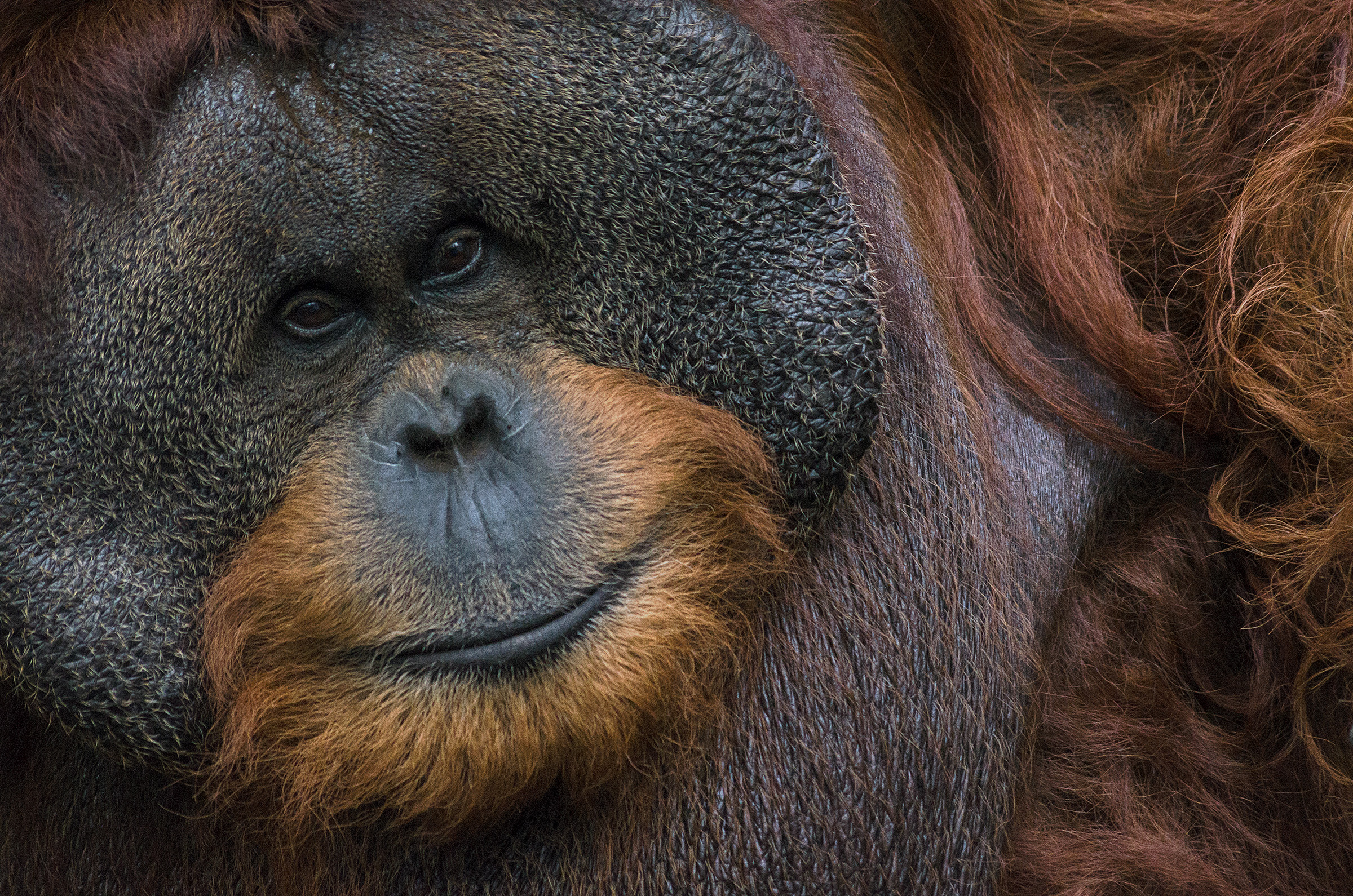
Male Bornean orangutan in Taman Safari park

The Bornean orangutan was originally named and scientifically described by Carl Linnaeus in 1799 under the scientific name Simia satyrus, meaning "satyr monkey", but was changed when scientists discovered that not all orangutans are one species. The holotype of this organism is located in the British Museum in London. It has three subspecies:

- Northwest Bornean orangutan Pongo pygmaeus pygmaeus – Sarawak and northern West Kalimantan;
- Central Bornean orangutan P. p. wurmbii – Southern West Kalimantan and Central Kalimantan;
- Northeast Bornean orangutan P. p. morio – East Kalimantan and Sabah.

There is some uncertainty about this, however. The population currently listed as P. p. wurmbii may be closer to the Sumatran orangutan (P. abelii) than to the Bornean orangutan. If this is confirmed, P. abelii would be a subspecies of P. wurmbii (Tiedeman, 1808). In addition, the type locality of P. pygmaeus has not been established beyond doubt; it may be from the population currently listed as P. wurmbii (in which case P. wurmbii would be a junior synonym of P. pygmaeus, while one of the names currently considered a junior synonym of P. pygmaeus would take precedence for the taxon in Sarawak and northern West Kalimantan). Bradon-Jones et al. considered P. morio to be a synonym of P. pygmaeus, and the population found in East Kalimantan and Sabah to be a potentially unnamed separate taxon.

== Etymology ==
The genus name Pongo is derived from the Bantu word mpongo used to indicate a large primate. It was originally used to describe chimpanzees in Western African dialects. The species name pygmaeus is derived from the Greek word "pygmy" meaning dwarf.

== Evolution ==
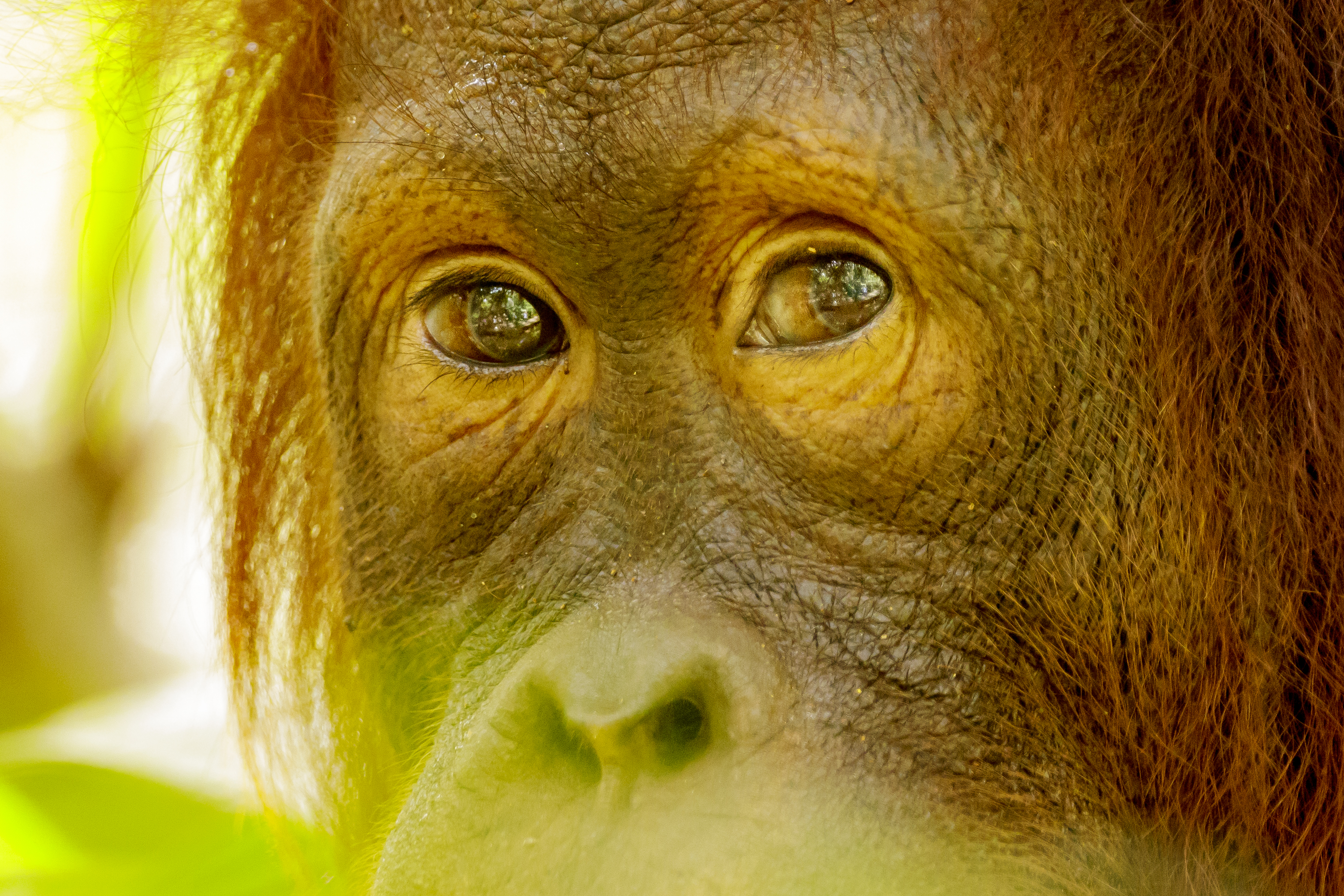
Juvenile male at Tanjung Puting National Park

Bornean orangutans diverged from Tapanuli orangutans about 674,000 years ago. The Bornean orangutan and the Sumatran orangutan diverged about 400,000 years ago, with a continued low level of gene flow between them since then. The Bornean orangutan and the Sumatran orangutan were considered merely subspecies until 1996; they were elevated to species following sequencing of their mitochondrial DNA. Tapanuli orangutan was identified as a distinct species in 2017.

The first complete orangutan fossil skeleton was discovered in the Hòa Bình Province in Vietnam and thought to be from the late Pleistocene epoch. It differed from modern orangutans only in that its body was proportionately smaller compared to its head. This fossil and others confirm that orangutans once inhabited continental Southeast Asia.

== Description ==
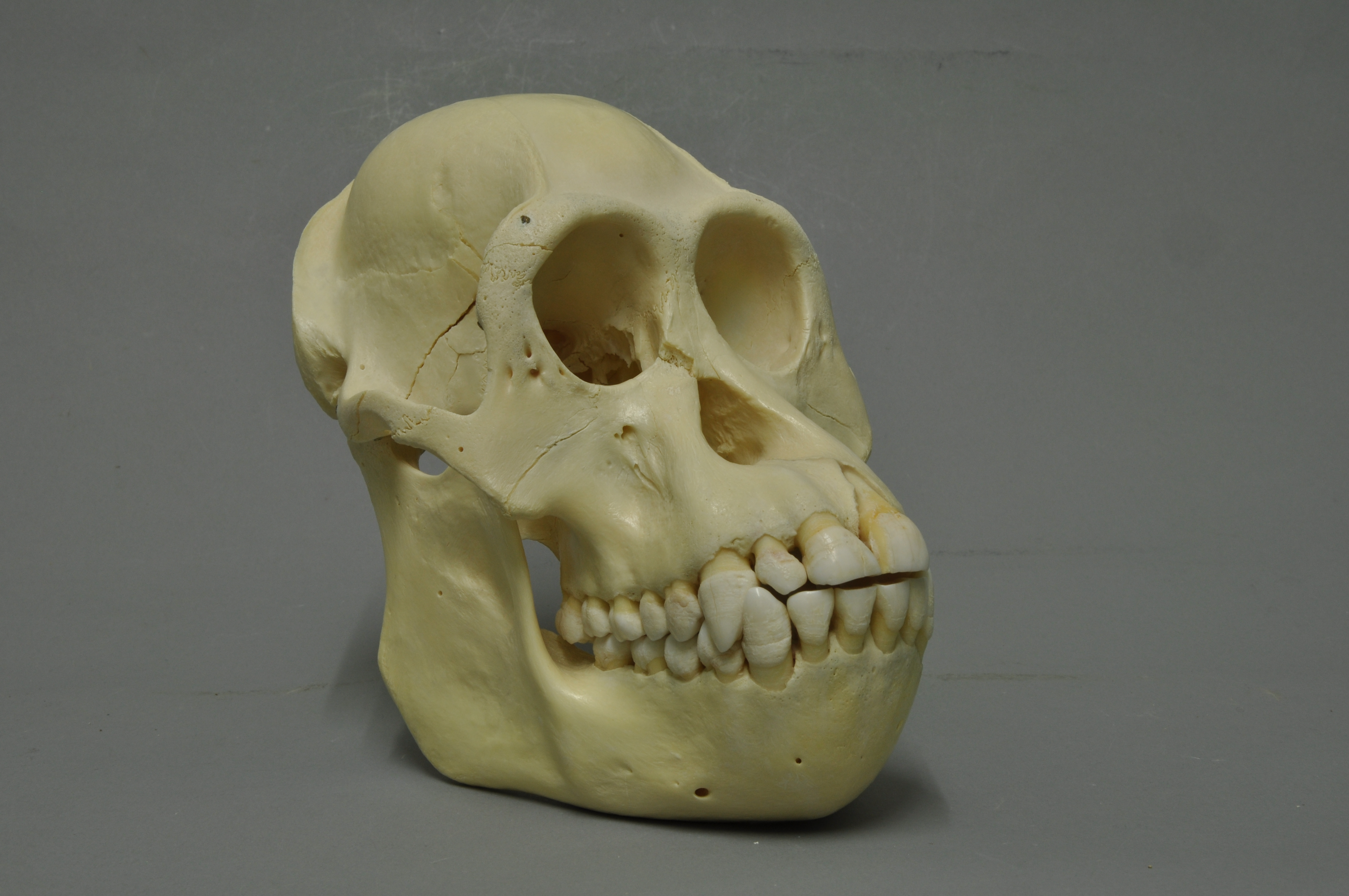
The skull

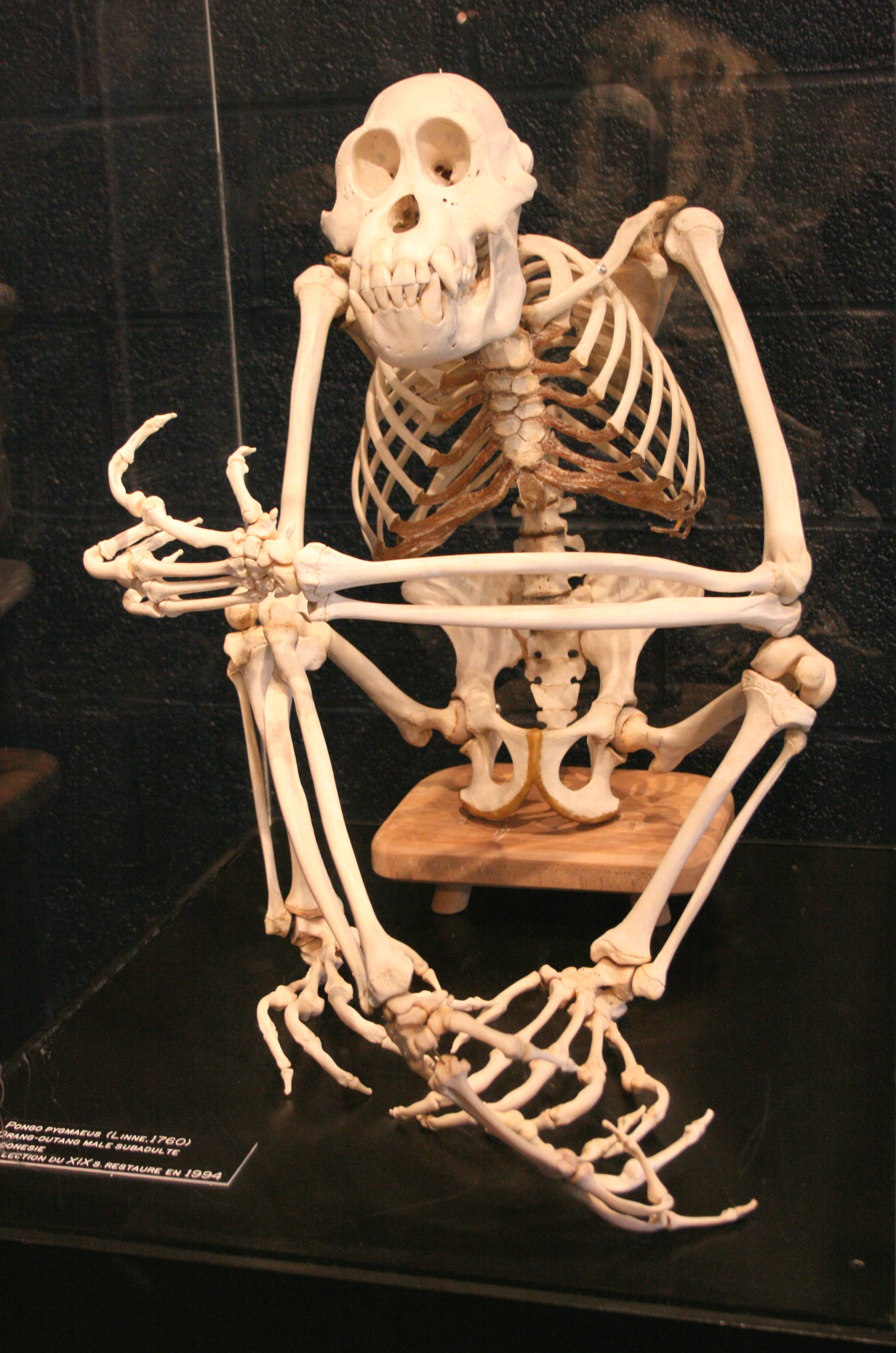
The skeleton

The Bornean orangutan is the third-largest ape after the western gorilla, and the largest truly arboreal (or tree-dwelling) extant ape. Body weights broadly overlap with the considerably taller Homo sapiens, but the latter is considerably more variable in size. By comparison, the Sumatran orangutan is similar in size but, on average, is marginally lighter in weight. A survey of wild orangutans found that males weigh on average 75 kg (165 lb), ranging from 50 to 100 kg (110 to 220 lb), and 1.2–1.7 m (3 ft 11 in – 5 ft 7 in) long; females average 38.5 kg (85 lb), ranging from 30 to 50 kg (66 to 110 lb), and 1–1.2 m (3 ft 3 in – 3 ft 11 in) long. While in captivity, orangutans can grow considerably overweight, up to more than 165 kg (364 lb). The heaviest known male orangutan in captivity was an obese male named "Andy", who weighed 204 kg (450 lb) in 1959 when he was 13 years old.

The Bornean orangutan has a distinctive body shape with very long arms that may reach up to 1.5 metres in length. It has grey skin, a coarse, shaggy, reddish coat and prehensile, grasping hands and feet. Its coat does not cover its face unlike most mammals, although Bornean orangutans do have some hair on their faces including a beard and mustache. It also has large, fatty cheek pads known as flanges as well as a pendulous throat sac.

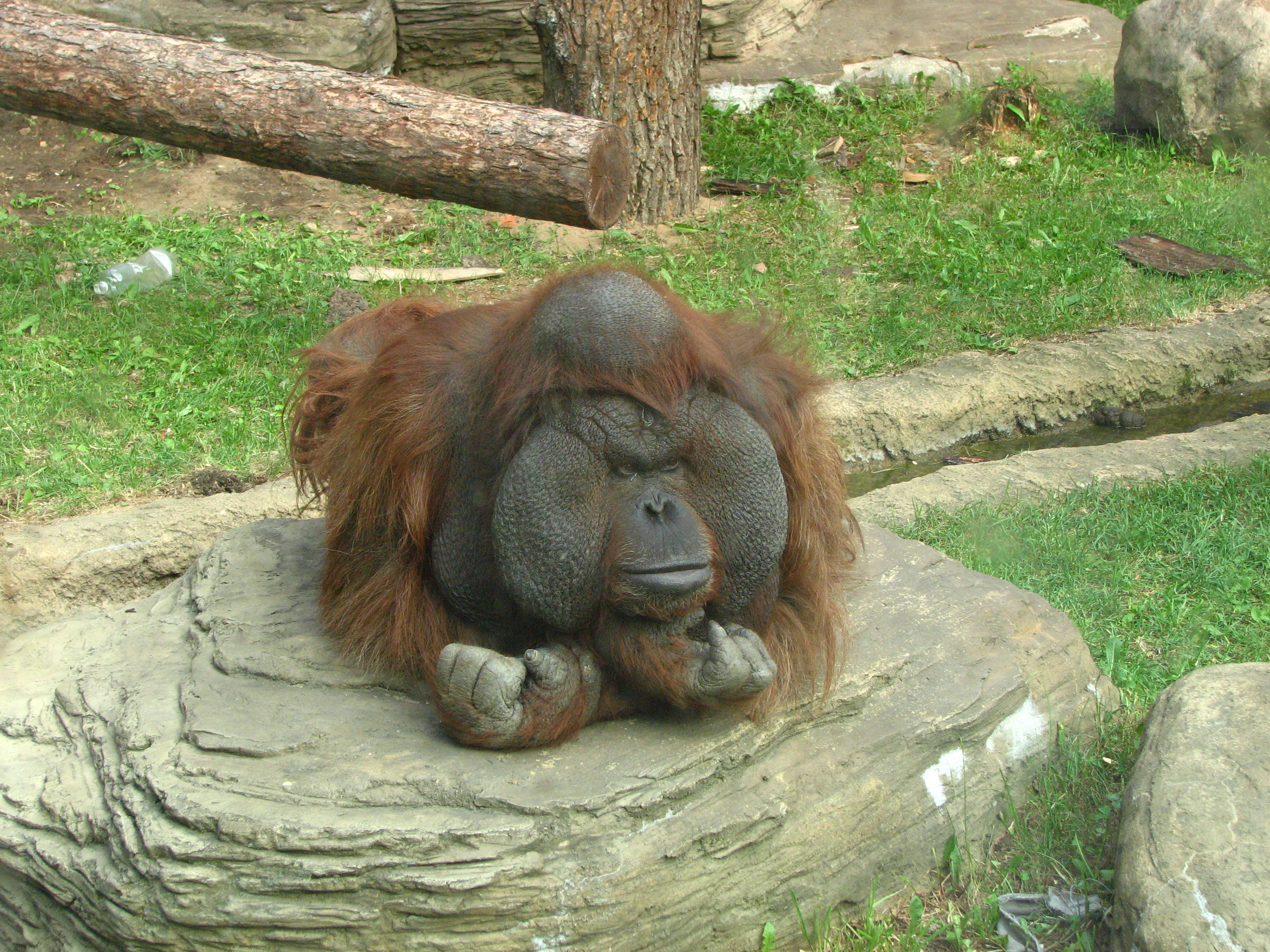
A male orangutan at the Moscow Zoo. The male's face pad widens as he grows older.

Bornean orangutans are highly sexually dimorphic and have several features that differ between males and females. Males have much larger cheek pads, or flanges, that are composed of muscle and large amounts of fat. In females, the flanges are mostly composed of muscle. Males have relatively larger canines and premolars. Males have a more pronounced beard and mustache. The throat sac in males is also considerably larger. There are two body types for sexually mature males: smaller or larger. Larger males are more dominant but smaller males still breed successfully. There is little sexual dimorphism at birth.

== Distribution and habitat ==
The Bornean orangutan occurs in the two Malaysian states of Sabah and Sarawak, and four of the five Indonesian Provinces of Kalimantan, while its presence in Brunei is uncertain and unconfirmed; due to habitat destruction, its distribution is patchy throughout the island, and it has become rare in the southeast of Borneo and in the forest between the Rajang River in central Sarawak and the Padas River in western Sabah It lives in the Borneo lowland rain forests and in the Borneo montane rain forests in mountainous areas up to 1,500 m (4,900 ft). It inhabits the canopy of old-growth and secondary forests, and moves large distances to find fruit-bearing trees.

In early October 2014, researchers found about 50 orangutans in several groups in South Kalimantan Province, although previously there is no record that the province has orangutans.

== Behavior and ecology ==
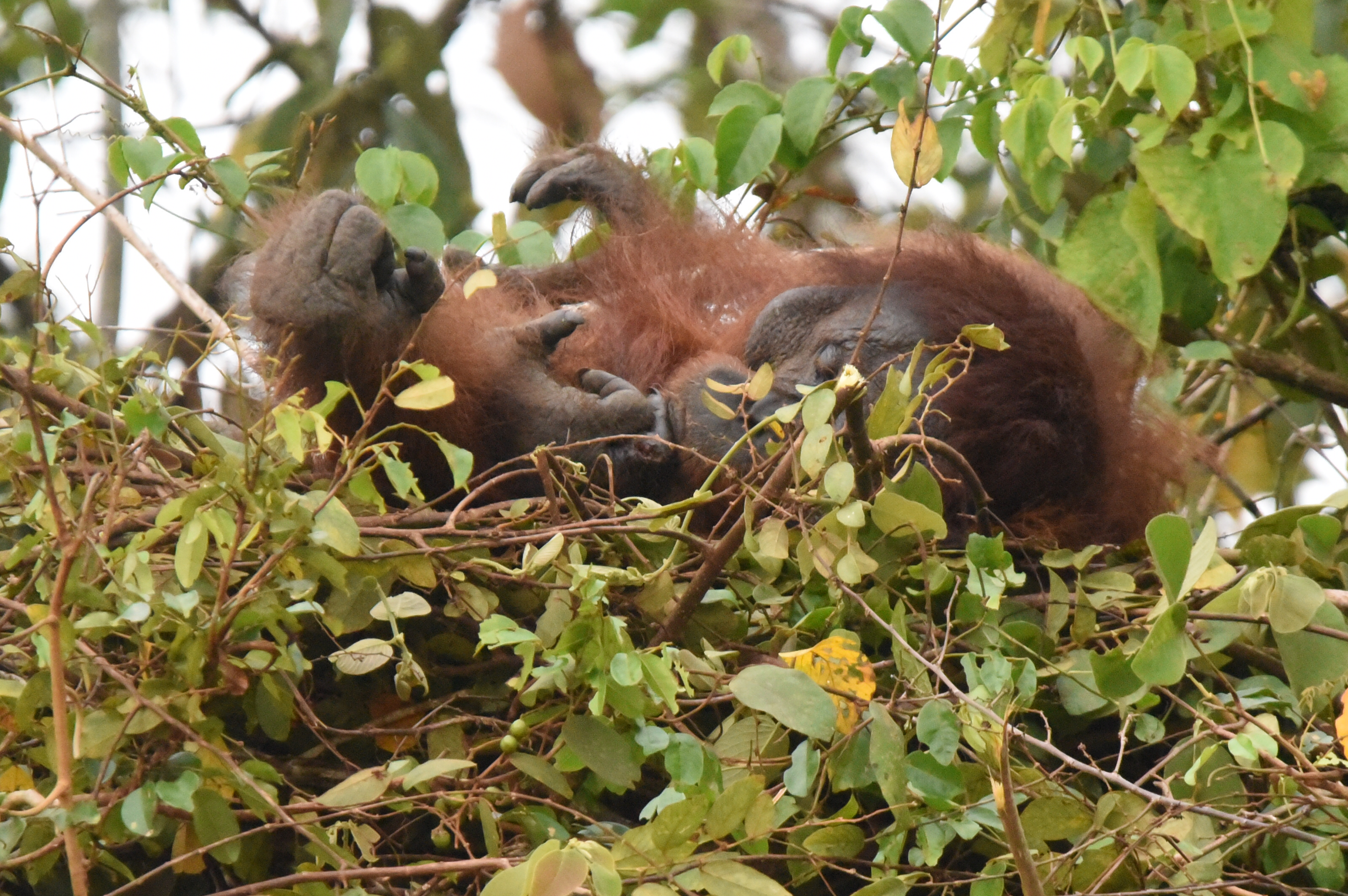
Bornean orangutan in its nest

In history, orangutans ranged throughout Southeast Asia and into southern China, as well as on the island of Java and in southern Sumatra. They primarily inhabit peat swamp forest, tropical heath forest, and mixed dipterocarp forest. Bornean orangutan are more solitary than their Sumatran relatives. Two or three orangutans with overlapping territories may interact, but only for short periods of time. Although orangutans are not territorial, adult males will display threatening behaviors upon meeting other males, and only socialize with females to mate. Males are considered the most solitary of the orangutans. The Bornean orangutan has a lifespan of 35–45 years in the wild; in captivity it can live to be about 60.

Despite being arboreal, the Bornean orangutan travels on the ground more than its Sumatran counterpart. This may be in part because no large terrestrial predators could threaten an orangutan in Borneo. In Sumatra, orangutans must face predation by the fierce Sumatran tiger.

The Bornean orangutan exhibits nest-building behavior. Nests are built for use at night or during the day. Young orangutans learn by observing their mother's nest-building behaviour. This skill is practiced by juvenile orangutans. Nests may be elaborate and involve a foundation and mattress made by intertwining leaves and branches and adding broken leafy branches. Additional features such as shade, waterproof roof, "pillow", and "blanket", all of which are made from branches, twigs and leaves, may also be added. Nest-building in primates is considered as an example of tool use and not animal architecture.

The species has been observed using tools such as leaves to wipe off faeces, a pad of leaves for holding spiny durian fruit, a leafy branch for a bee swatter, a bunch of leafy branches held together as an "umbrella" while traveling in the rain, a single stick as backscratcher, and a branch or tree trunk as a missile.

=== Diet ===
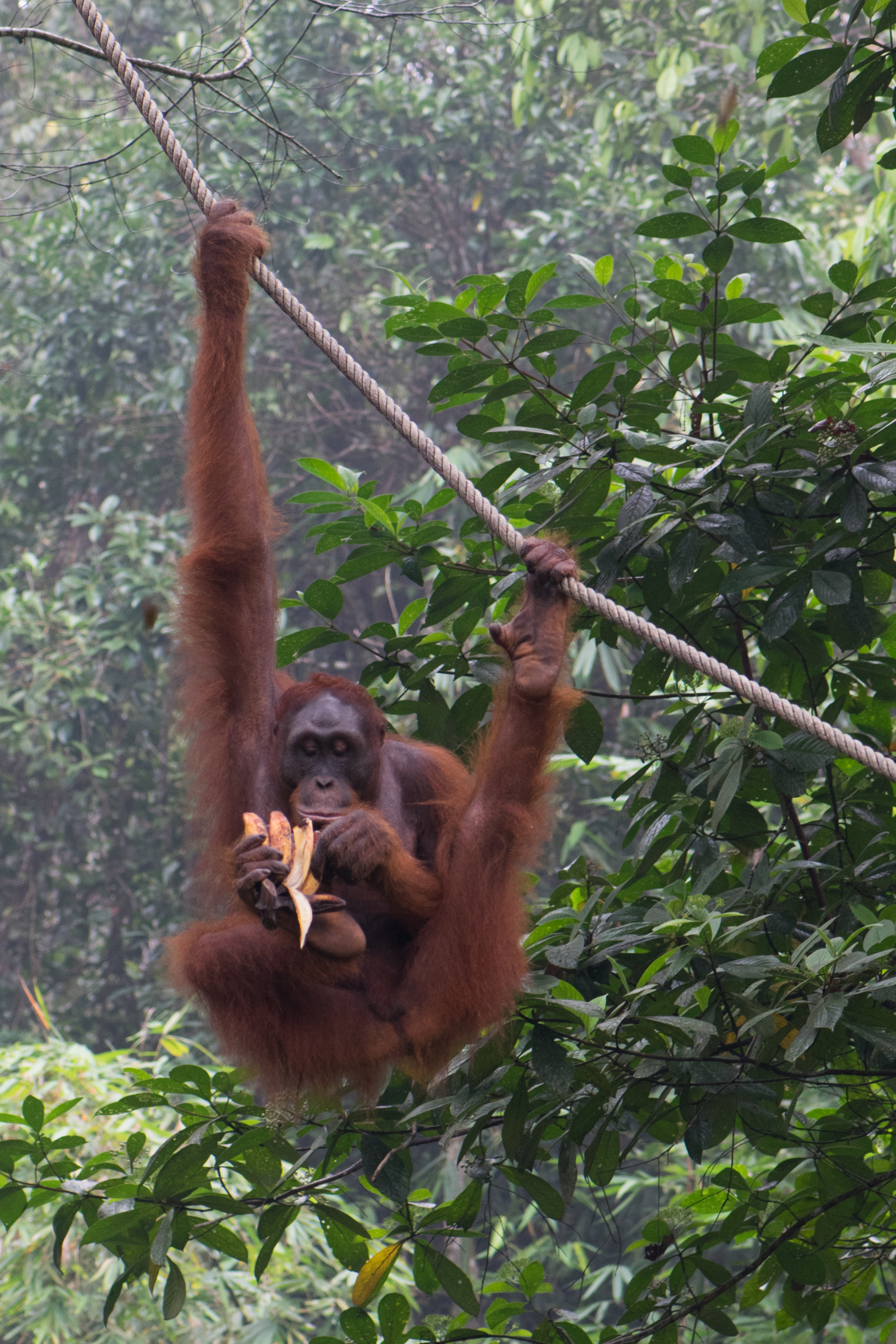
An orangutan peeling a banana with its hand and foot

The Bornean orangutan's diet is composed of over 400 types of food, including wild figs, Durio zibethinus and D. graveolens, leaves, seeds, flowers, sap, the inner shoots of plants and vines, bark, honey, fungi, bird eggs, spider webs and insects. It get the necessary quantities of water from both fruit and from tree holes. Some individuals have been observed eating dead fish on shores and even grabbing live fish out of the water. In some regions, it occasionally eats soil to get minerals that may neutralize toxins and acids consumed in the vegetarian diet. On rare occasions, it preys upon smaller primates, such as slow lorises.

Dental microwear texture analysis suggests no significant dietary variation exists between Bornean orangutans of different sexes or ages.

=== Reproduction ===
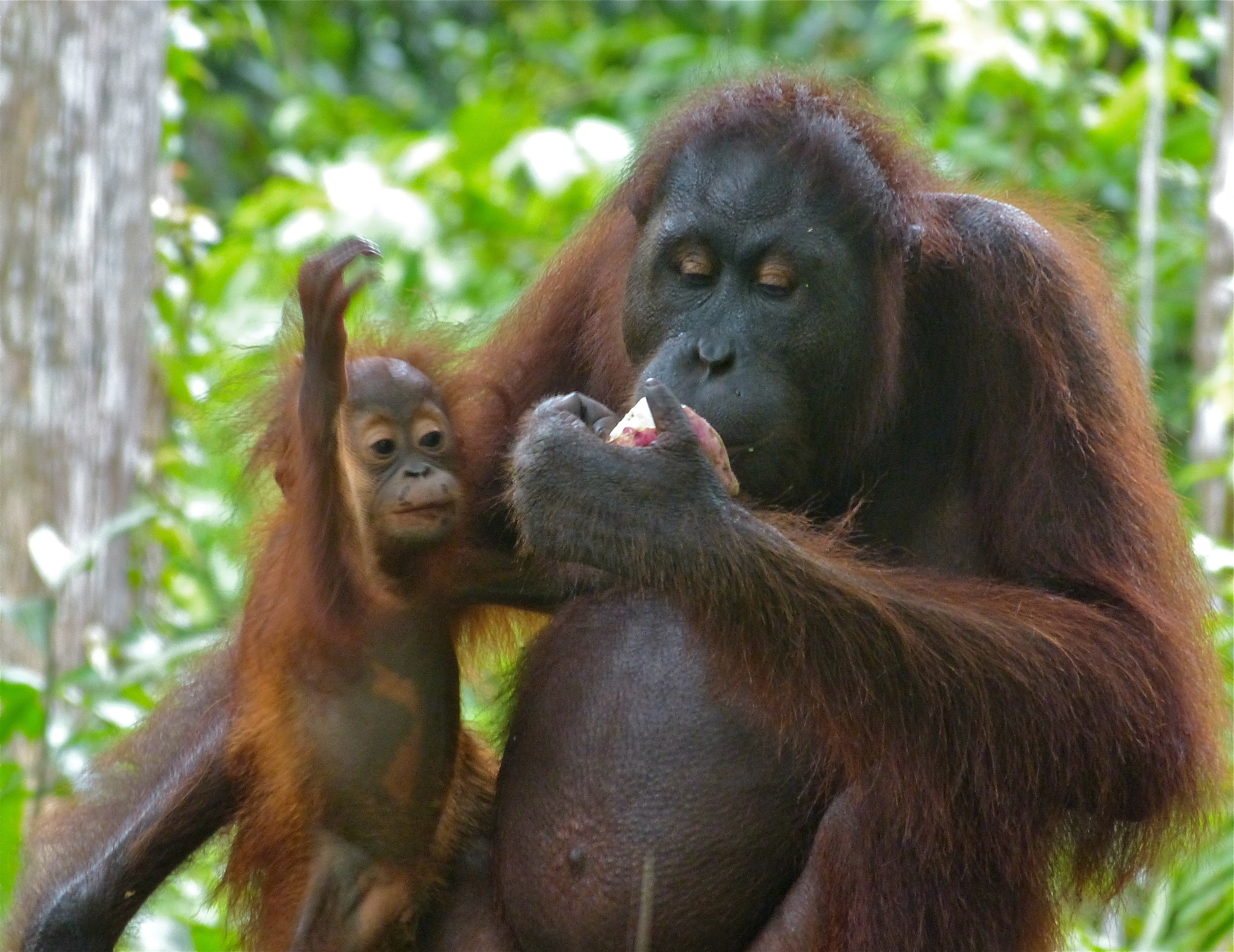
A rehabilitated female with her young baby in Sepilok Orang Utan Rehabilitation Centre

Males and females generally come together only to mate. Subadult males try to mate with any female and are successful around half the time. Dominant flanged males will call and advertise their position to receptive females, who prefer mating with flanged males. Adult males will often target females with weaned infants as mating partners because the female is likely to be fertile.

Females reach sexual maturity and experience their first ovulatory cycle between about six and 11 years of age, although females with more body fat may experience this at an earlier age. The estrous cycle lasts between 22 and 30 days and menopause has been reported in captive orangutans at about age 48. Females tend to give birth at about 14–15 years of age. Newborn orangutans nurse every three to four hours, and begin to take soft food from their mothers' lips by four months. During the first year of its life, the young clings to its mother's abdomen by entwining its fingers in and gripping her hair. Offspring are weaned at about four years, but this could be much longer, and soon after they start their adolescent stage of exploring, but always within sight of their mother. During this period, they will also actively seek other young orangutans to play with and travel with. On average, juveniles do not become completely independent until they are about seven years of age. The birth rate for orangutans has been decreasing largely due to a lack of sufficient nutrients as a result of habitat loss.

A 2011 study on female orangutans in free-ranging rehabilitation programs found that individuals that were supplemented with food resources had shorter interbirth intervals, as well as a reduced age, at first birth.

== Conservation status ==
The Bornean orangutan is more common than the Sumatran, with about 104,700 individuals in the wild, whereas just under 14,000 Sumatran orangutans are left in the wild. Orangutans are becoming increasingly endangered due to habitat destruction and the bushmeat trade, and young orangutans are captured to be sold as pets, usually entailing the killing of their mothers.

The Bornean orangutan is critically endangered according to the IUCN Red List of mammals, and is listed on Appendix I of CITES. The total number of Bornean orangutans is estimated to be less than 14% of what it was in the recent past (from around 10,000 years ago until the middle of the 20th century), and this sharp decline has occurred mostly over the past few decades due to human activities and development. Species distribution is now highly patchy throughout Borneo; it is apparently absent or uncommon in the southeast of the island, as well as in the forest between the Rajang River in central Sarawak and the Padas River in western Sabah (including the Sultanate of Brunei). A population of around 6,900 is found in Sabangau National Park, but this environment is at risk.

This view is also supported by the United Nations Environment Programme, which stated in its 2007 report that, due to illegal logging, fire and the extensive development of palm oil plantations, orangutans are critically endangered, and if the current trend continues, they will become extinct. When forest is burned down to clear room for palm oil plantations, not only does the Bornean orangutan suffer from habitat loss, but several individuals have been burned and killed in fires. Palm oil accounts for over one tenth of Indonesia's export earnings. It is in high demand because it is used in several packaged foods, deodorants, shampoos, soaps, candies, and baked goods.

Climate change is another threat to Bornean orangutan conservation. The effects that human activity have had on Indonesian rainfall have made food less abundant and so Bornean orangutans are less likely to receive full nutrients so that they can be sufficiently healthy to breed.

A November 2011 survey, based on interviews with 6,983 respondents in 687 villages across Kalimantan in 2008 to 2009, gave estimated orangutan killing rates of between 750 and 1800 in the year leading up to April 2008. These killing rates were higher than previously thought and confirm that the continued existence of the orangutan in Kalimantan is under serious threat. The survey did not quantify the additional threat to the species due to habitat loss from deforestation and expanding palm-oil plantations. The survey found that 73% of respondents knew orangutans were protected by Indonesian law.

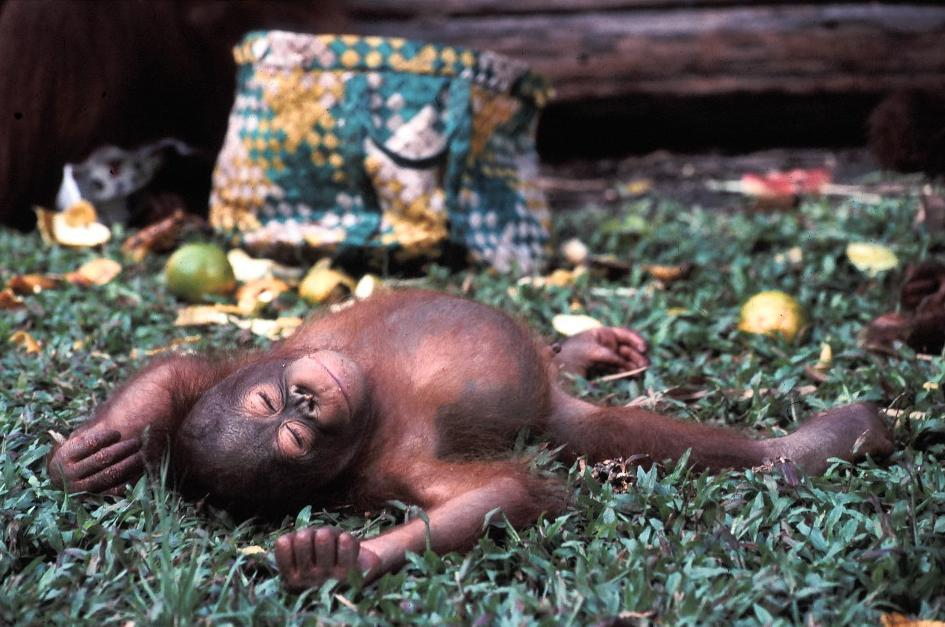
A young captive orangutan sleeping.

However, the Indonesian government rarely prosecutes or punishes perpetrators. In a rare prosecution in November 2011, two men were arrested for killing at least 20 orangutans and a number of long-nosed proboscis monkeys. They were ordered to conduct the killings by the supervisor of a palm oil plantation, to protect the crop, with a payment of $100 for a dead orangutan and $22 for a monkey.

=== Rescue and rehabilitation centers ===
Hong Kong Zoological and Botanical Gardens.

A number of orangutan rescue and rehabilitation projects operate in Borneo.

The Borneo Orangutan Survival Foundation (BOS) founded by Willie Smits has rescue and rehabilitation centres at Wanariset and Samboja Lestari in East Kalimantan and Nyaru Menteng, in Central Kalimantan founded and managed by Lone Drøscher Nielsen. BOS also works to conserve and recreate the fast-disappearing rainforest habitat of the orangutan, at Samboja Lestari and Mawas.

Orangutan Foundation International, founded by Birutė Galdikas, rescues and rehabilitates orangutans, preparing them for release back into protected areas of the Indonesian rain forest. In addition, it promotes the preservation of the rain forest for them.

The Sepilok Orangutan Rehabilitation Centre near Sandakan in the state of Sabah in Malaysian Borneo opened in 1964 as the first official orangutan rehabilitation project.

Orangutan Foundation, founded by Ashley Leiman, operates programmes in Central Kalimantan, Indonesian Borneo. The Foundation rescues orphaned orangutans and enters them into their soft-release programme, allowing them to develop the skills necessary to survive in the wild. When old enough, orangutans are released into the protected Lamandau Wildlife Reserve. Orangutan Foundation works to protect orangutans by focusing on habitat protection and capacity building, especially in local communities.

A seven-year longitudinal study published in 2011 looked at whether the lifespan of zoo-housed orangutans was related to a subjective assessment of well-being, with the intent of applying such measures to assess the welfare of orangutans in captivity. Of the subjects, 100 were Sumatran (Pongo abelii), 54 Bornean (Pongo pygmaeus) and 30 were hybrid orangutans. 113 zoo employees, who were highly familiar with the typical behavior of the orangutans, used a four-item questionnaire to assess their subjective well-being. The results indicated that orangutans in higher subjective well-being were less likely to die during the follow-up period. The study concluded that happiness was related to longer life in orangutans.

In late 2014, Nyaru Menteng veterinarians failed to rescue the life of a female orangutan. An operation was performed in which 40 air-rifle pellets were removed from her body. The orangutan was found at a palm oil plantation in Indonesian Borneo.

== Genome and demographic history ==
Orangutans and humans diverged lineages approximately 14–18 million years ago. About 17,000 years ago, there was a migration of the Bornean orangutans as they eventually went to Sumatra, effectively trading places with the Sumatra orangutans that were there at the time. These two species of orangutans have been closely related throughout their evolutionary history because they were so close in physical proximity. Therefore, their genomes and demographic history are similar. The two species themselves are estimated to have split about 3.5 million years ago. Although these two species have officially diverged, it is speculated that the reason as to why they are genetically similar is because the males of each respective species tend to migrate between the two islands and breed with the females from their sister species. As a result, both the Bornean orangutans and the Sumatran orangutans have been studied closely as a pair, and thus much genome findings attribute evolutionary changes to this relationship. In addition, the Bornean orangutans, as compared to the Sumatran orangutans, have lower autosomal gene diversity. This is attributed to the fact that they have a much smaller population size. Also, the Bornean orangutans have lower nucleotide diversity.

As the Bornean orangutans and Sumatran orangutans both exist within the same genus, they exhibit similar cultural behaviors that have been found to exist amongst most orangutan populations. The fact that orangutans tend to showcase similar cultural traditions is because they typically live in similar environments and are adept at learning from one another from their early stages of life.

The Bornean orangutan has been linked to the fact that it has gone through a deep divergence in relation to its relatives and ancestors. During the Middle Pleistocene, there were low levels of gene flow, which was determined through the analysis of Y-chromosomal data. One reason as to why this may have occurred is because of the Sunda Shelf, which is where the island of Borneo is located. During this time, this event's dry climate during the Late Pleistocene attributed to a more abundant genetic exchange. As a result, there were many early divergences of gene pools between the Bornean orangutans, as well as the Sumatran orangutans. Relating back to the Middle Pleistocene, the Bornean orangutan lineage went through a dramatic population decline. This is likely attributed to the fact that they had been isolated from their ancestral populations. Therefore, natural geographic barriers are attributed to be the reason as to why the Bornean orangutans were eventually isolated and ended up colonizing other regions. In addition, this geographic isolation also indicates that the Bornean orangutans did not undergo a severe genetic bottleneck. With the Borneo orangutan, selection was found to have been found through physiological adaptations – most of which has to do with being able to adapt to the ever-changing climate on the Borneo island.

== See also ==
- Deforestation in Borneo
- Social and environmental impact of palm oil
