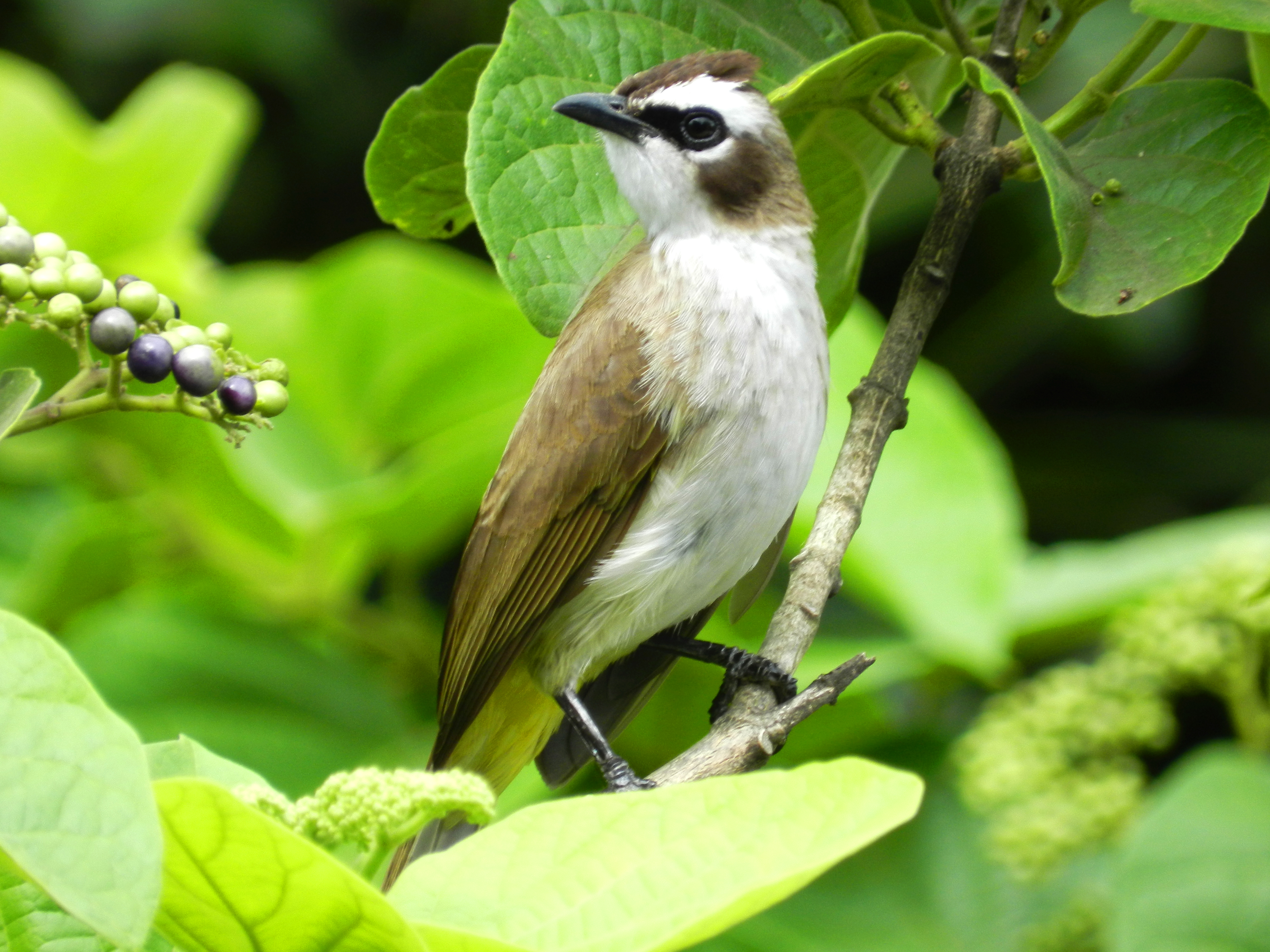
- Nominate P. g. goiavier in Santa Maria, Luzon, Philippines

Conservation status
- Least Concern (IUCN 3.1)

Scientific classification
- Kingdom: Animalia
- Phylum: Chordata
- Class: Aves
- Order: Passeriformes
- Family: Pycnonotidae
- Genus: Pycnonotus
- Species: P. goiavier

Binomial name
- Pycnonotus goiavier (Scopoli, 1786)
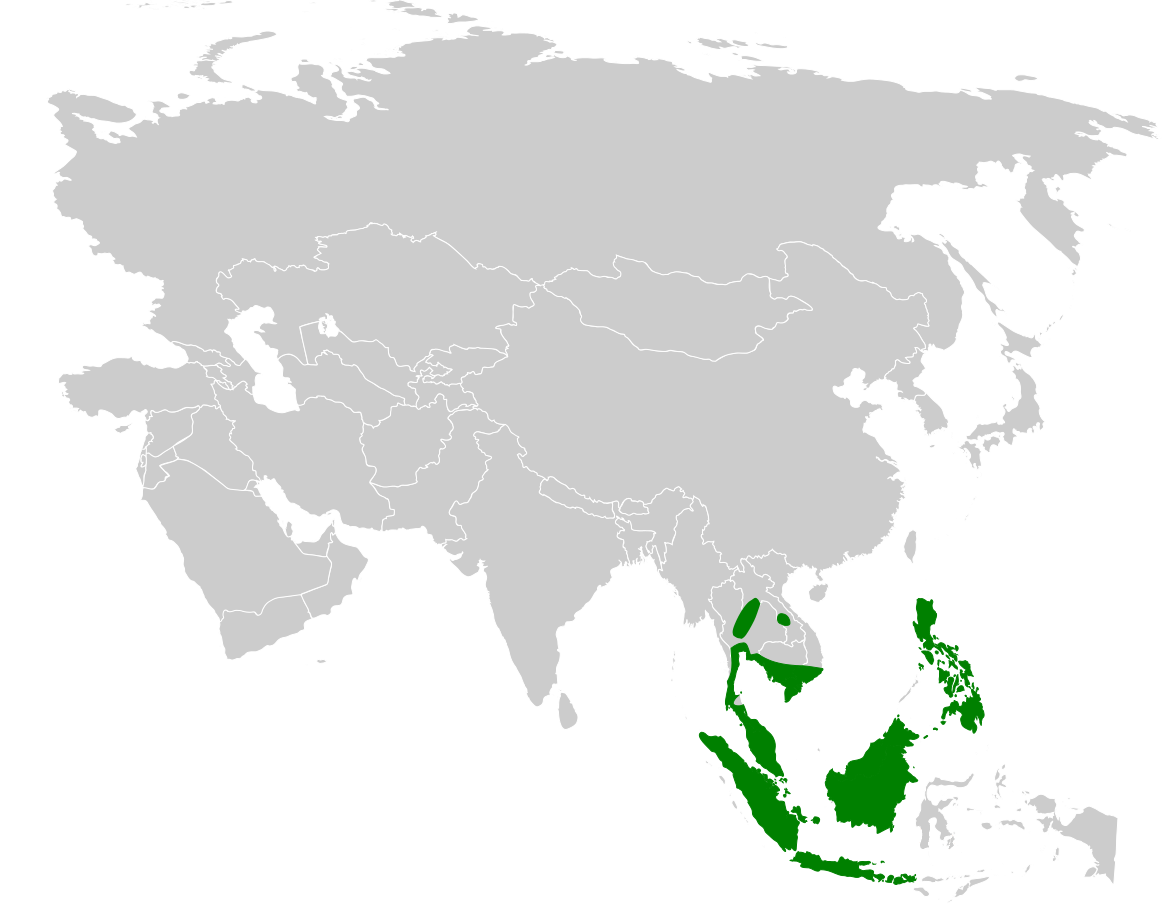
- Range in green

Synonyms
- Muscicapa goiavier (protonym)

= Yellow-vented bulbul =

Species of bird

The yellow-vented bulbul (Pycnonotus goiavier), or eastern yellow-vented bulbul, is a member of the bulbul family of passerine birds. It is a resident breeder in southeastern Asia from Indochina to the Philippines. It is found in a wide variety of open habitats but not in deep forests. It is one of the most common birds in cultivated areas. They appear to be nomadic and roam from place to place regularly.

== Taxonomy and systematics ==
The yellow-vented bulbul was originally classified in the genus Muscicapa.

Six subspecies are accepted:

- P. g. jambu - Deignan, 1955: southern Myanmar to southern Indochina
- P. g. analis - (Horsfield, 1821) (protonym Turdus analis): Malay Peninsula, Sumatra and nearby islands, Java, Bali, Lombok and Sumbawa
- P. g. gourdini - G.R. Gray, 1847 (as "yourdini", orthographic error): Borneo, Maratua and Karimunjava Islands
- P. g. goiavier - (Scopoli, 1786): northern and north-central Philippines (Luzon, Mindoro, West Visayas)
- P. g. samarensis - Rand & Rabor, 1960: central Philippines (East Visayas)
- P. g. suluensis - Mearns, 1909: southern Philippines (Mindanao and Sulu Archipelagos)

== Behaviour and ecology ==
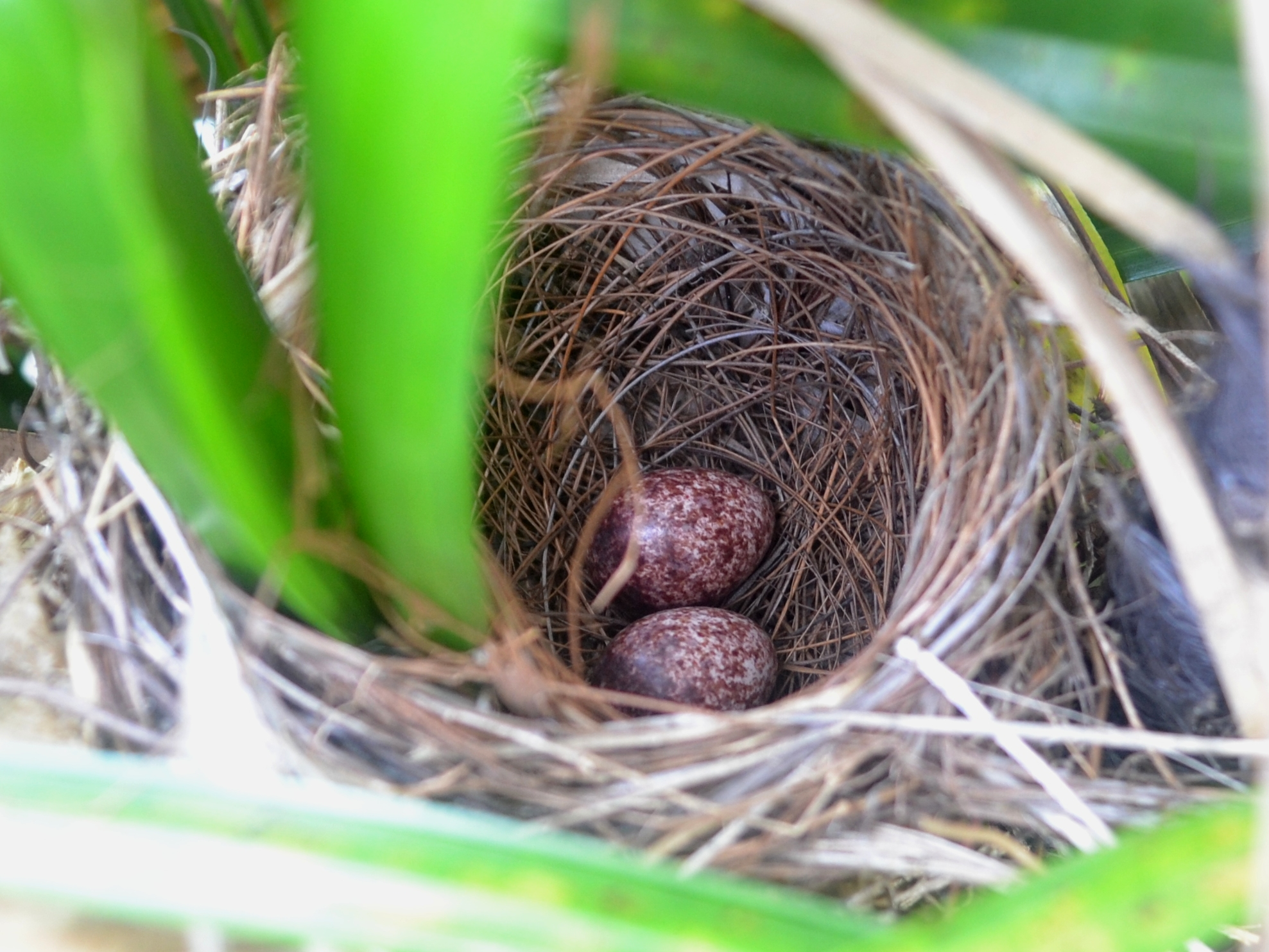
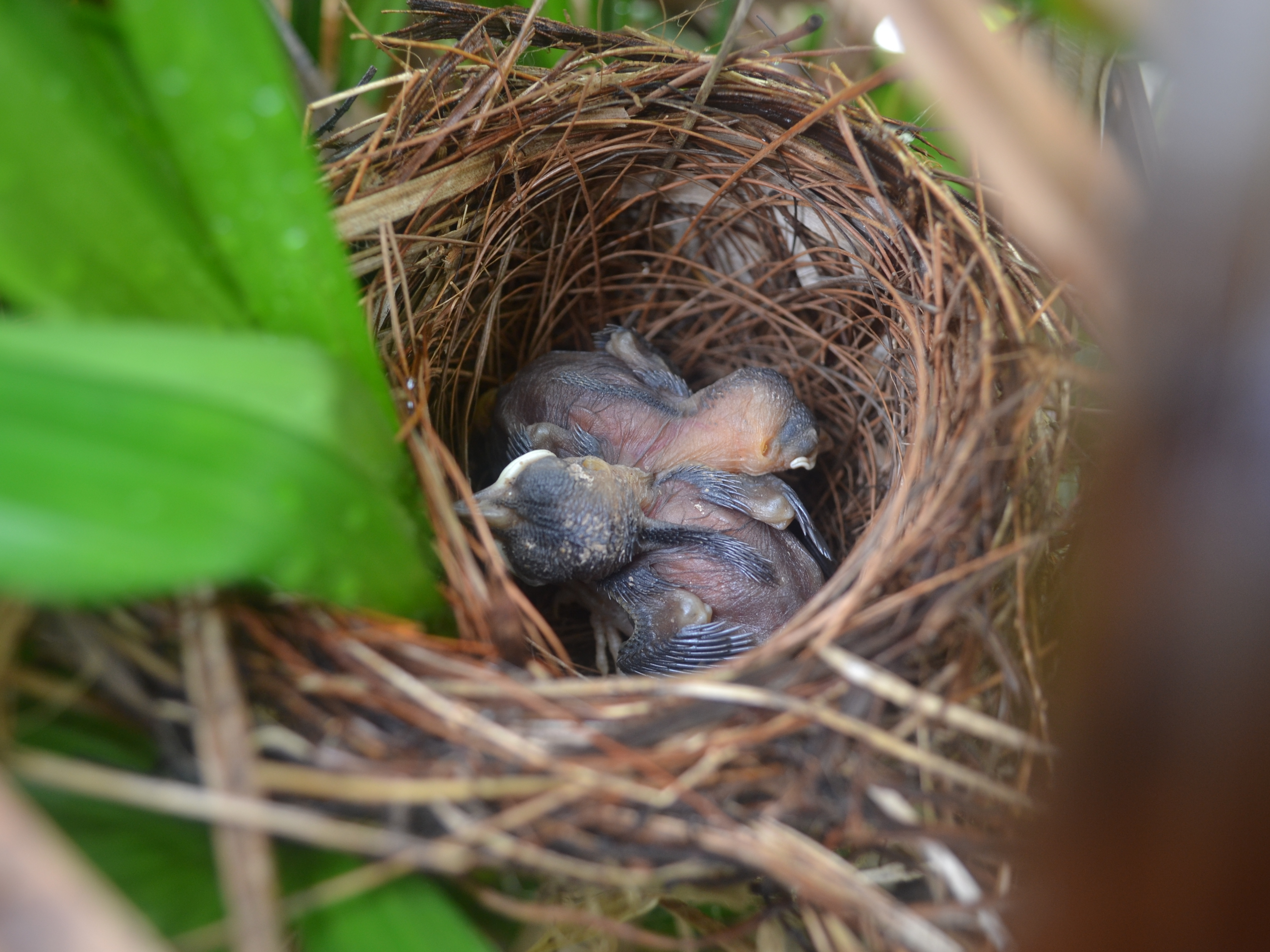
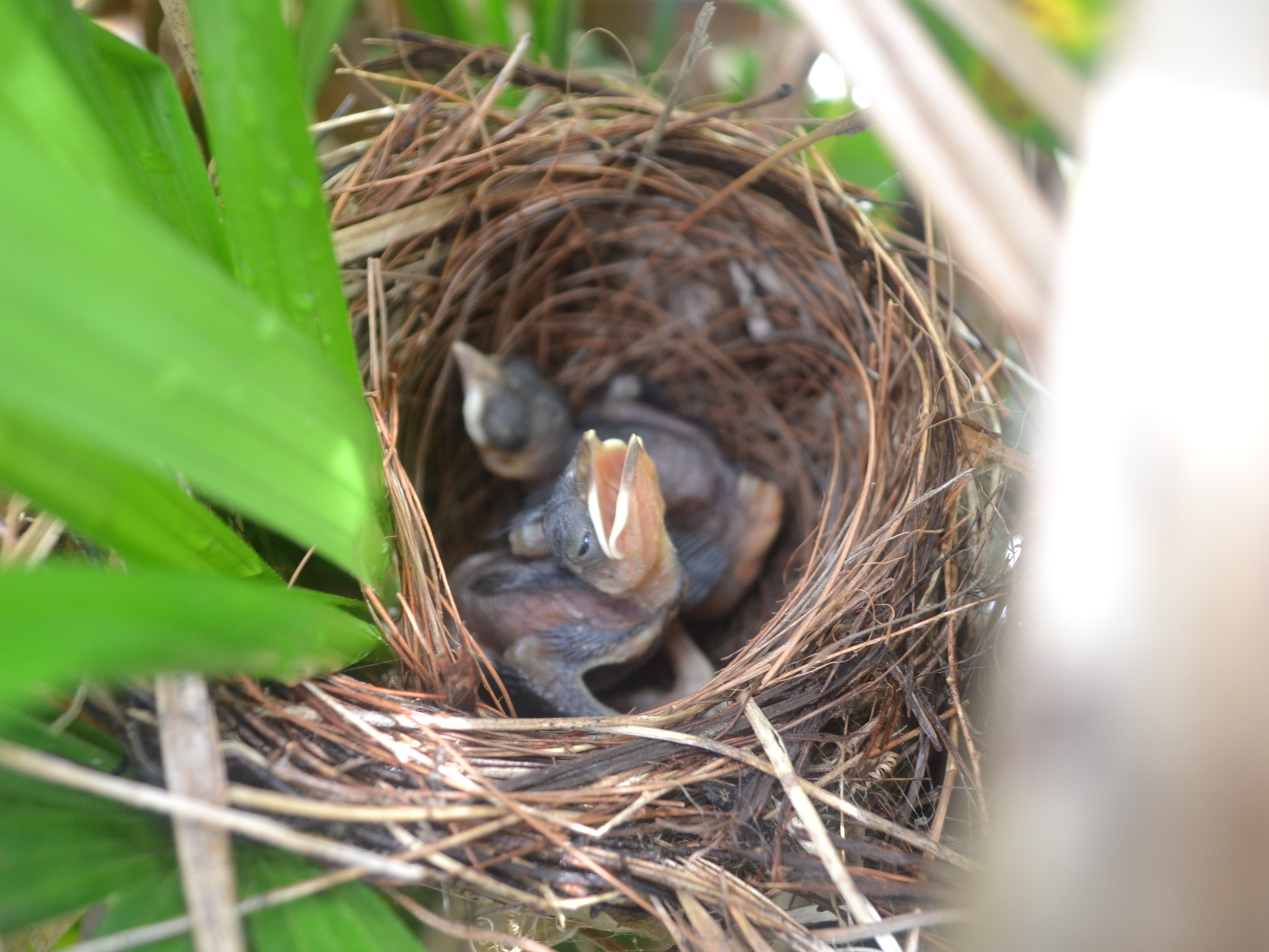
Eggs and chicks 5 days after hatching

The yellow-vented bulbul is adapted to human environments and even nests in gardens from low bushes to high trees. It builds a well-camouflaged but fragile, loose, deep, cup-shaped circular nest from grass, leaves, roots, vine stems, and twigs. The nest is untidy on the outside, but neatly lined with plant fibres. It lays 2–5 eggs between February and June.

The yellow-vented bulbul eats berries and small fruit. It also sips nectar, nibbles on young shoots, and consumes some insects.
