= The Burning Season (2008 film) =

2008 film by Cathy Henkel

- Directed by: Cathy Henkel
- Written by: Cathy Henkel
- Produced by: Jeff Canin, Cathy Henkel and Trish Lake
- Starring: Lone Drøscher Nielsen, Dorjee Sun, Achmadi
- Narrated by: Hugh Jackman
- Cinematography: Leonard Retel Helmrich, Ismail Fahmi Lubis
- Edited by: Jane St Vincent Welch
- Music by: Nicolette Boaz
- Distributed by: National Geographic International
- Release dates: 2 August 2008 (BIFF); 10 September 2009 (New Zealand)
- Running time: 90 minutes
- Country: Australia
- Language: English
- Budget: AU $755,529

The Burning Season is a documentary about the burning of rainforests in Indonesia which premiered at the Tribeca Film Festival in 2008. The main characters featured in the film are: Dorjee Sun from Australia; Achmadi, a small-scale palm oil farmer from Jambi province in Indonesia; and Lone Drøscher Nielsen, a Danish conservationist based in Kalimantan, Indonesia.

== Synopsis ==
Every year, there is a burning season in Indonesia. Areas of rainforest the size of Denmark are cut down and set alight by farmers and corporations to develop palm oil plantations. As well as destroying the habitat of critically endangered orangutans, new scientific evidence shows that deforestation comprises 20% of global carbon emissions, contributing significantly to climate change.

A 30-year-old Australian environmental entrepreneur, Dorjee Sun, sets out to find a solution. Using expertise gained during the dot-com boom, Dorjee forms a small carbon-trading firm and signs up three pioneering Indonesian governors to partner in his venture. His idea involves selling the carbon credits represented by large forest areas in Aceh and Papua to big carbon emitters in the West. Despite the scepticism surrounding carbon trading, Dorjee's quest for a 'big deal' takes him from Sydney to New York, Washington DC, San Jose, San Francisco and London.

Meanwhile, another burning season is underway. Achmadi, a small-scale Indonesian farmer, sets fire to his newly acquired piece of forest to clear it for palm oil. But he too has to face up to the impact of his burning on the global climate. And in Borneo, Danish-born Lone Drøscher-Nielsen rescues and cares for orangutans injured or orphaned by the fires. As she prepares for the release of rehabilitated orangutans back into the wild, the UN Climate Change Conference in Bali commences. Everything hinges on whether all the countries of the world can agree on the wording of a new climate change protocol and whether protection of forests will be included. As the drama of this historic moment plays out, Dorjee relentlessly pursues his deal. Is he a pioneer or a profiteer? What value does his concept offer to the remaining forests of the world and to the challenges of climate change?.

== Production ==
The film was updated in 2009 with a new ending which included the impacts of the 2008 financial crisis and a meeting with California Governor Arnold Schwarzenegger. The film had a theatrical release in Australia and a digital release in the USA through FilmBuff. The DVD remains widely used in the education sector.

The production attracted philanthropic support through the Documentary Australia Foundation, including from an unnamed Melbourne family trust. Broadcast partners were ABC, BBC and CBC with National Geographic as distributor. Financial support was also provided by the Film Finance Corporation Australia, the NSW Film and TV Office and the Australian Film Commission. A total production budget of $755,529 was raised.

=== Executive producer ===
While Roger Graef is credited as the film's Executive Producer on the production's website, the post-roll credits on the Australian DVD release list him more specifically as the Executive Producer of the BBC version of the film.

== Awards ==
- Brisbane International Film Festival Audience Choice Award 2008 [Preview Cut]
- Inside Film Award for Best Documentary
- nominated for an EMMY Award (Outstanding Documentary on a Business Topic)
- Producer/Director Cathy Henkel awarded SPAA (Screen Producer Association of Australia) Documentary Producer of the Year Award for her work on The Burning Season.

== See also ==
- Deforestation in Indonesia
- Social and environmental impact of palm oil
- Asian brown haze
- Rise of the Eco-Warriors (2014) Cathy Henkel's latest film, also about the forests of Indonesia.
