= Kahayan River =

Kahayan River Sungai Kahayan
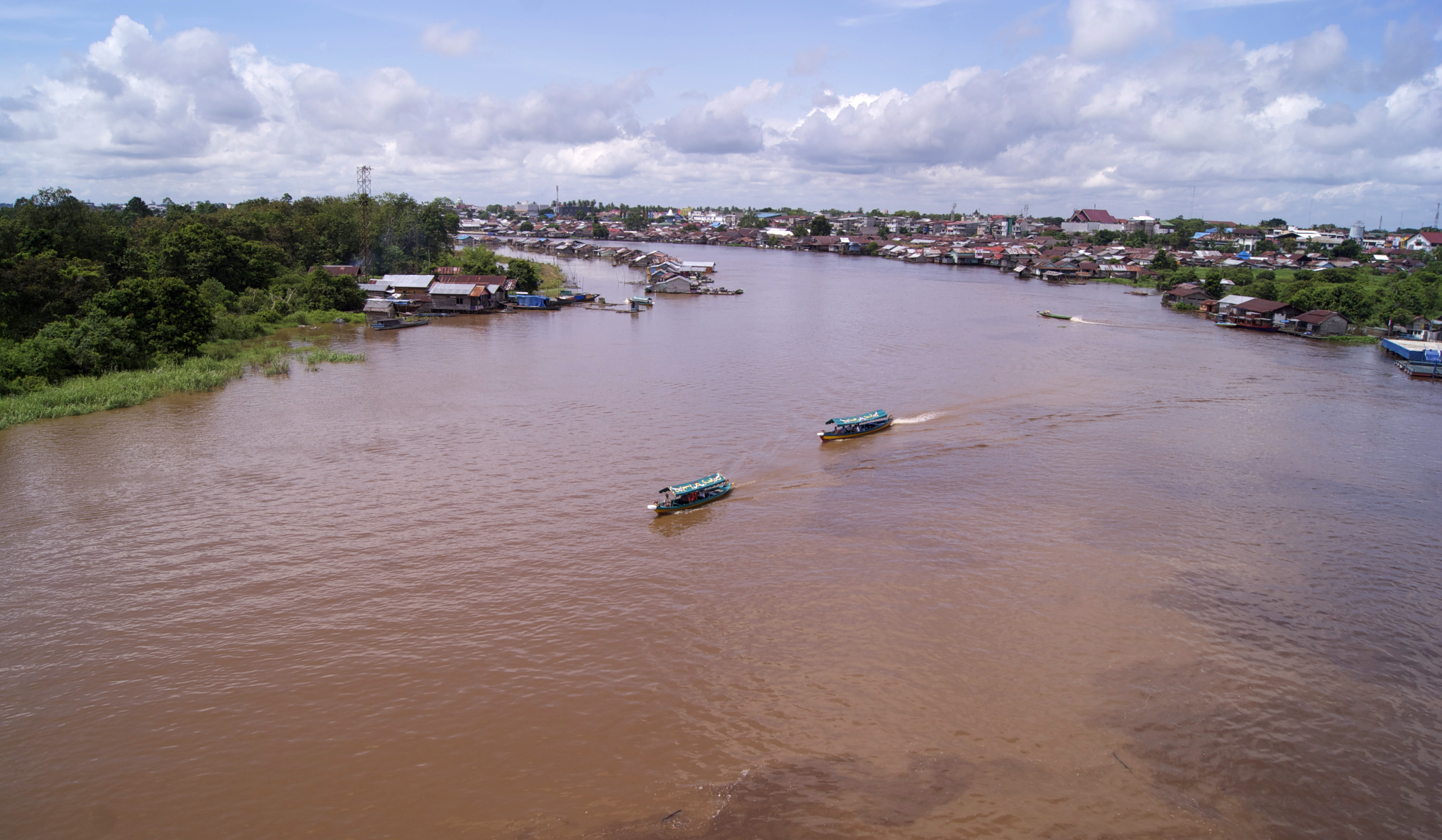
- Kahayan River in Palangka Raya

- River mouth location Kahayan River (Indonesia)

Location
- Country: Indonesia

Physical characteristics
- Source: Schwaner Mountains
  - location: Central Kalimantan and West Kalimantan, Borneo
- Mouth: Java Sea
  - location: Bapuju (Pulang Pisau Regency)
  - coordinates: 3°21′0″S 114°1′58″E
- Length: 658 km (409 mi)
- Basin size: 15,500 km^{2} (6,000 mi^{2}) 15,373 km^{2} (5,936 mi^{2})
- Discharge
  - location: Java Sea (near mouth)
  - average: 1,178.4 m^{3}/s (41,610 cu ft/s)
- Discharge
  - location: Palangkaraya (Basin size: 6,958 km^{2} (2,686 sq mi)
  - average: 771 m^{3}/s (27,200 cu ft/s)

Basin features
- River system: Kahayan basin (DAS320365)

The Kahayan River, or Great Dayak River, is the second largest river after the Barito River in Central Kalimantan, a province of Indonesia in Kalimantan – the Indonesian part of the island of Borneo. With a total length of 658 km (409 mi) and with a drainage basin of 15,500 km^{2} (6,000 mi^{2}) in South Kalimantan, Indonesia. Mean annual discharge 1,178 m^{3}/s (41,600 cu ft/s). The provincial capital Palangkaraya lies on the river. The main inhabitants are Dayaks, who practice slash-and-burn rice cultivation and pan for gold on the upper reaches. The lower Kayahan flows through a rich and unusual environment of peat swamp forests, which has been severely degraded by an unsuccessful program to convert a large part of the area into rice paddies, compounded by legal and illegal forestry.

== Geography ==
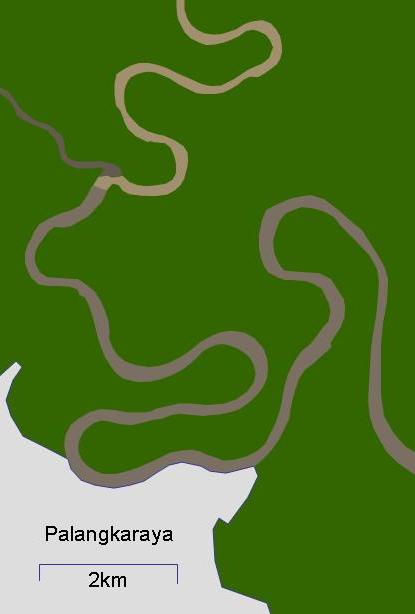
Kahayan river to the north of Palangkaraya. The river meanders through most of its length, and often shifts its bed

Central Kalimantan covers 153,800 km^{2}, with 82% tropical rainforest and no more than 3% agricultural land. The northern part of the province is mountainous, the central area has flat and fertile tropical forests and the southern area is swampy. The forests provide rattan, resin, and high-quality woods. The climate is hot and humid, typically around 30° most of the year. Annual rainfall is between 2800 and 3400 mm.

The Kahayan River originates in the northern mountains, then meanders for 658 km southward through the plains to the Java Sea. Tidal effects are felt 50 km – 80 km inland from the sea. A study found 28 species of fish throughout the river, 44 species in the Danau Sabuah lake, and 12 species in the traditional fish ponds. The riparian wetlands were the main spawning areas. Fishermen are reporting declining yields due to problems with water quality.

== People ==
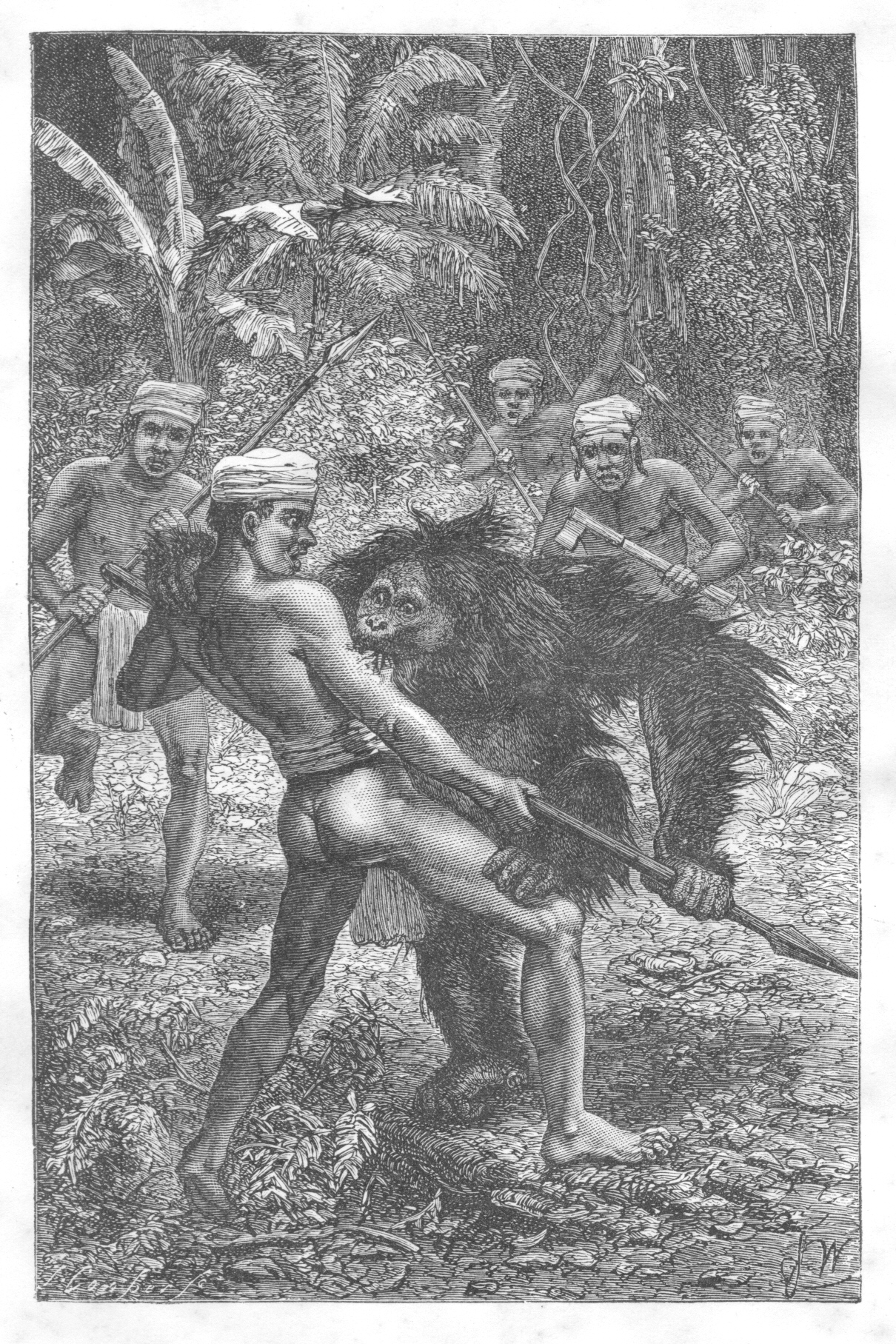
Orangutan attacked by Dayaks. Victorian illustration.

The Dayak tribes are the dominant people in the Kahayan River region. An Austronesian people, they have preserved some of their original culture and Kaharingan religion. They speak languages of the Barito family, related to the Malagasy language spoken in Madagascar. The Kaharingan religion combines ancestor worship, animism, and dynamism. It is now considered a form of Hinduism.

The main Dayak tribes are the Ngaju, Ot Danum, and Ma'anyan. The Ot Danum remains in the upstream regions of the Kahayan, Barito, Kapuas, and Rungan rivers and preserves a traditional way of life. Many still live in longhouses and subsist through hunting, fishing, and basic agriculture. Village elders practice traditional medicine and mark their status with intricate body tattoos and heavy ear adornments. The Ngaju have moved downstream, and to some extent assimilated with the mixed population of the towns further down the river, which includes Javanese, Maduranese, Batak, Toraja, Ambonese, Bugis, Palembang, Minang, Banjarese, Makassar, Papuan, Balinese, Acehnese, and Chinese.

== Peat Swamp Forest and the Mega Rice Project ==
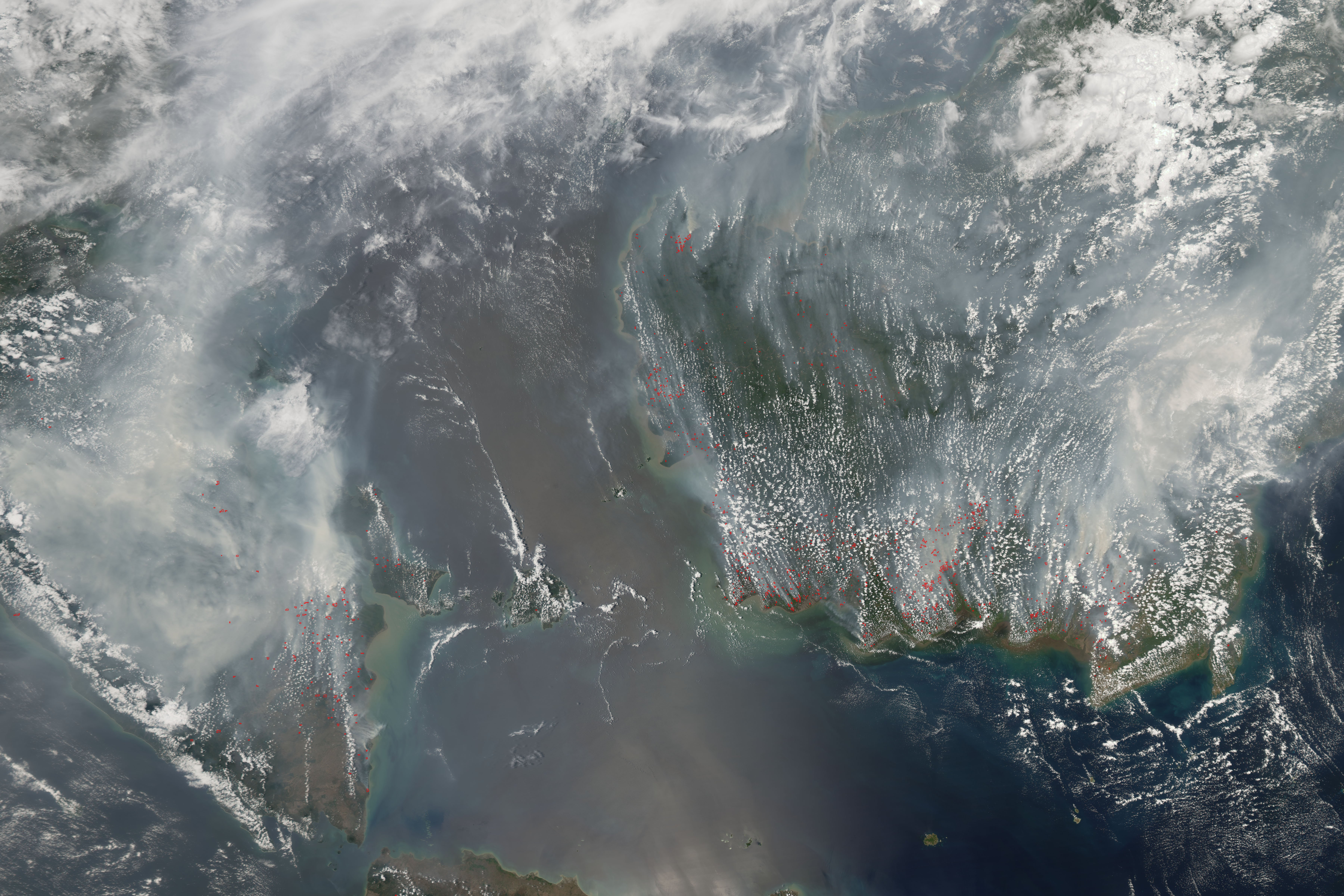
Smoke from agricultural and forest fires burning on Sumatra (left) and Borneo (right) in late September and early October 2006

The lower reaches of the Kahayan River used to flow through a huge area of peat swamp forest, an unusual ecosystem that is home to many unique or rare species such as orangutans, as well as to slow-growing but valuable trees. The peat swamp forest is a dual ecosystem, with diverse tropical trees standing on a 10m – 12m deep layer of partly decayed and waterlogged plant material, which in turn covers relatively infertile soil. The peat swamp forests were being slowly cleared for small-scale farming and plantations before 1997, but most of the original cover remained.

In 1996 the government initiated the Mega Rice Project (MRP), which aimed to convert one million hectares of peat swamp forest to rice paddies. Between 1996 and 1998, more than 4,000 km of drainage and irrigation channels were dug, and deforestation started in part through legal and illegal forestry and in part through burning. It turned out that the channels drained the peat forests rather than irrigating them. Where the forests had often flooded up to 2m deep in the rainy season, now their surface is dry at all times of the year. The government has therefore abandoned the MRP, but the drying peat is vulnerable to fires which continue to break out on a massive scale.

Peat forest destruction is causing sulphuric acid pollution of the rivers. In the rainy seasons, the canals are discharging acidic water with a high ratio of pyritic sulfate into the Kahayan River up to 150 km upstream from the river mouth. This may be a factor contributing to lower fish catches.

== Mining ==
People have panned for gold in the Kahayan River for centuries. Following test drilling, a consortium of Canadian and Indonesian companies announced in 1997 that in-situ gold resources were at least 3.4 million ounces. In 2002 a Canadian company with a background in community development programs proposed to develop artisanal mining in the headwaters of the Barito and Kahayan Rivers in Kalimantan, providing income for some 13,000 Dayak people at project maturity. A large number of informal prospectors are undertaking alluvial operations within the river system, and mining hard rock gold veins. Even those doing hard rock mining transport the ore to the rivers for processing. More than 2,000 illegal miners may converge on a site when there is a reported gold find. In Indonesia as a whole, nearly 180 tonnes of mercury are released into the environment annually.

== Kelompok Hutan Kahayan or Sabangau Forest ==
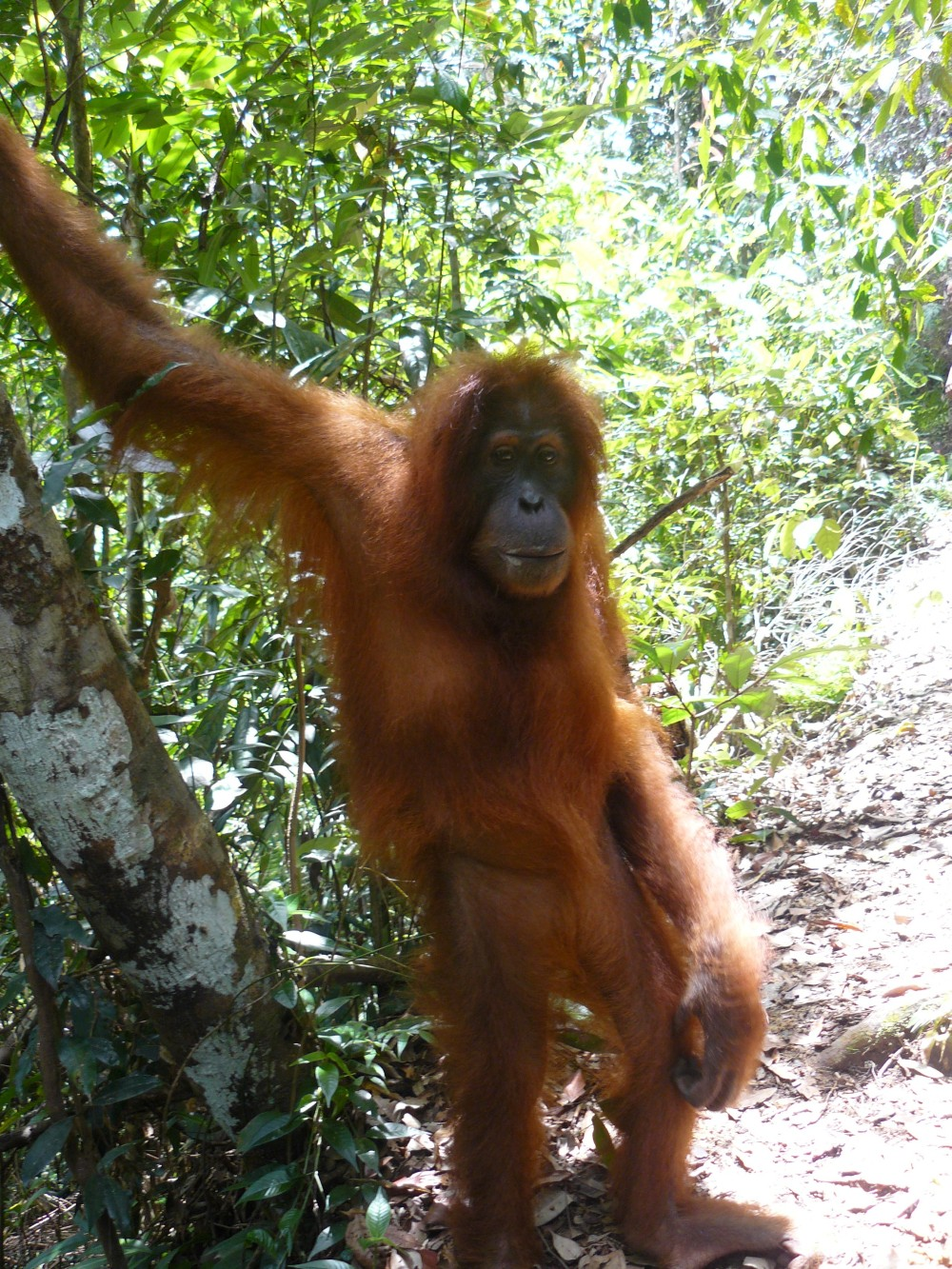
Orangutan in Bukit Lawang (Indonesia)

Hutan Kahaylan (2.55°S 113.7°E) is a peat swamp forest of about 150,000 hectares between the Kastingen and Kahayan rivers that so far have suffered least from the Mega Rice Project, although it has been badly damaged. Because it is close to the regional capital Palangkaraya it is still at risk. Vulnerable bird species include the large green pigeon (Treron capellei) and possibly Storm's stork (Ciconia stormi) and lesser adjutant (Leptoptilus javanicus). The Sabangau Forest is centered on the blackwater Sabangau River. There is no longer any continuous forest cover where orangutans may cross this river. The forest has been badly damaged by legal and illegal forestry, but the western part is now protected as either a National Park or a National Laboratory Research Area. With a relatively small human population, there is some hope that this area of the forest may recover. The more badly damaged eastern part, between the Sabangau and the Kayahan, is still officially designated for agriculture, although no further efforts are being made to make it suitable for this purpose.

== See also ==
- List of drainage basins of Indonesia
