= Peat swamp forest =

Forests with waterlogged soil preventing decomposition

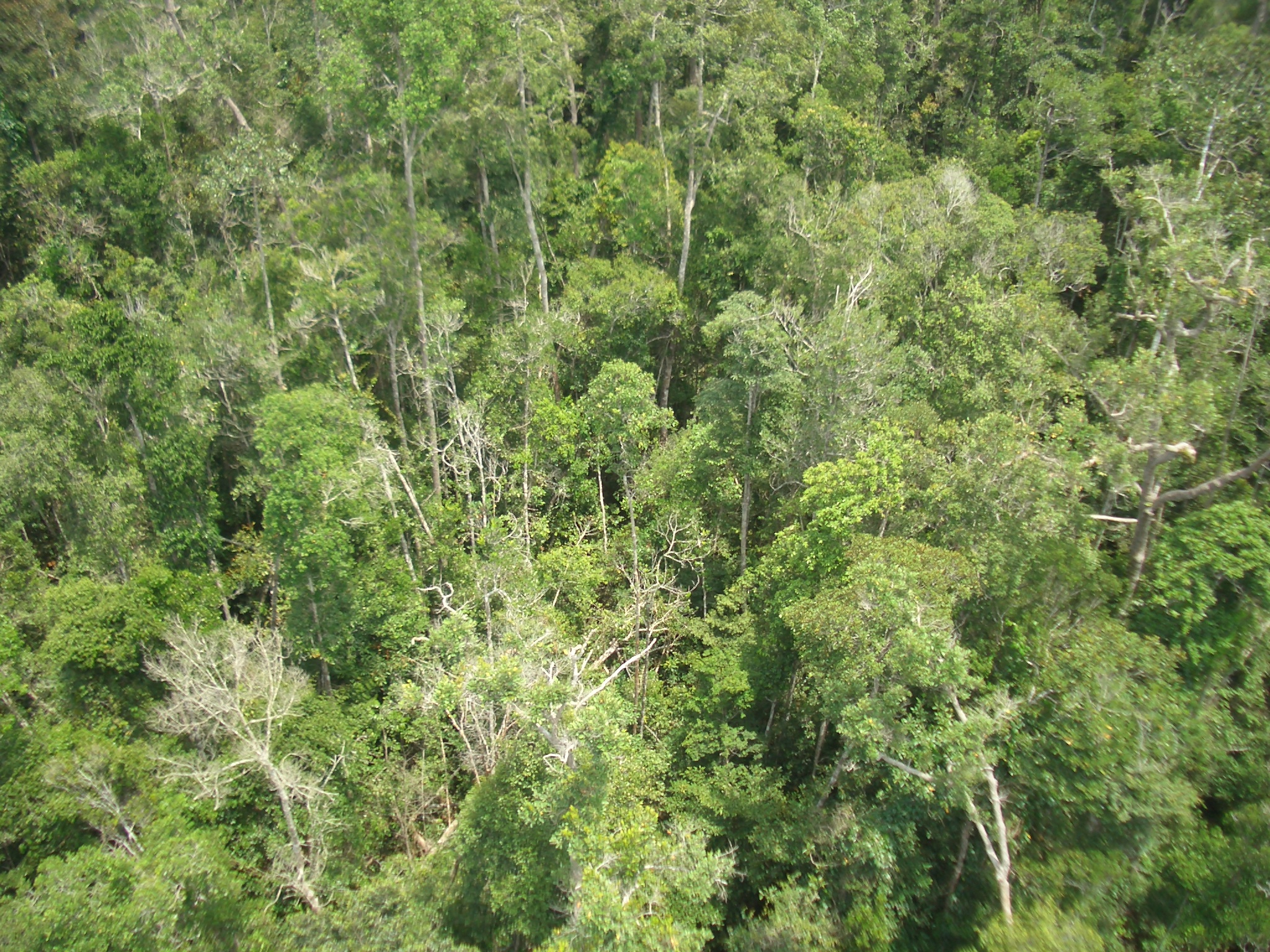
Peat swamp forest in Kalimantan

Peat swamp forests are tropical moist forests where waterlogged soil prevents dead leaves and wood from fully decomposing. Over time, this creates a thick layer of acidic peat. Peat swamp forests are typically surrounded by lowland rain forests on better-drained soils, and by brackish or salt-water mangrove forests near the coast.

They are a kind of wetland which store and accumulate vast amounts of carbon as soil organic matter—much more than forests on mineral soil contain. Peat formation is a natural carbon sink; because the decomposition of the organic matter is slower than its production rate, the surplus accumulates as peat. The stability of these forests has important implications for climate change; they are among the largest near-surface reserves of terrestrial organic carbon. Tropical peat swamp forests, which have ecological importance, are one of the most threatened yet least studied and most poorly understood biotypes.

Large areas of these forests are being logged at high rates. Since the 1970s, tropical peat swamp forest deforestation and drainage have greatly increased in South East Asia. In addition, El Niño–Southern Oscillation drought and large-scale fires are accelerating peatland devastation. Peat fires, drainage and deforestation enhance the decomposition of soil organic matter, increasing the release of stored carbon into the atmosphere as carbon dioxide.

Tropical peat swamp forests are home to thousands of animals and plants, including many rare and critically endangered species such as the orangutan and Sumatran tiger, whose habitats are threatened by peatland deforestation.

== Distribution ==
Tropical peat ecosystem are found in three regions: Central America, Africa and South East Asia. About 62% of the world's tropical peat lands occur in the Indomalayan realm (80% in Indonesia, 11% in Malaysia, 6% in Papua New Guinea, and pockets in Brunei, Vietnam, the Philippines, and Thailand). Peat in Indonesia is distributed over three islands, Sumatra (8.3 million ha), Kalimantan (6.3 million ha) and Papua (4.6 million ha). 36% of the world's tropical peat occurs in Africa's central Congo Basin.

== Formation ==
Tropical peat forms on low-lying areas, such as river deltas, floodplains or shallow oxbow lakes. The formation process usually follows hydrosere successional steps, where the ponds or flooded area eutrophicate by water plants, then transform into swamp with grasses or shrubs, and eventually form a forest that continues to grow and accumulate. Peat located on the fringing areas might form through lateral expansion. This peat accumulation often forms a convex shape called a dome, which could rise up to 4 m (13 ft) on coastal peat and up to 18 m (59 ft) on inland peat. At the beginning of its formation, peat is largely topogenous or minerotrophic, receiving high nutrient input from rivers or groundwater. As the peat thickens and the dome becomes elevated, the top of the peat is no longer affected by the river or groundwater input, instead soil becomes ombrotrophic, exclusively obtaining water from the precipitation Input only from the rain causes a low nutrient and mineral content, especially calcium. The peat thus becomes highly acidic and only able to support low biodiversity and stunted forest.

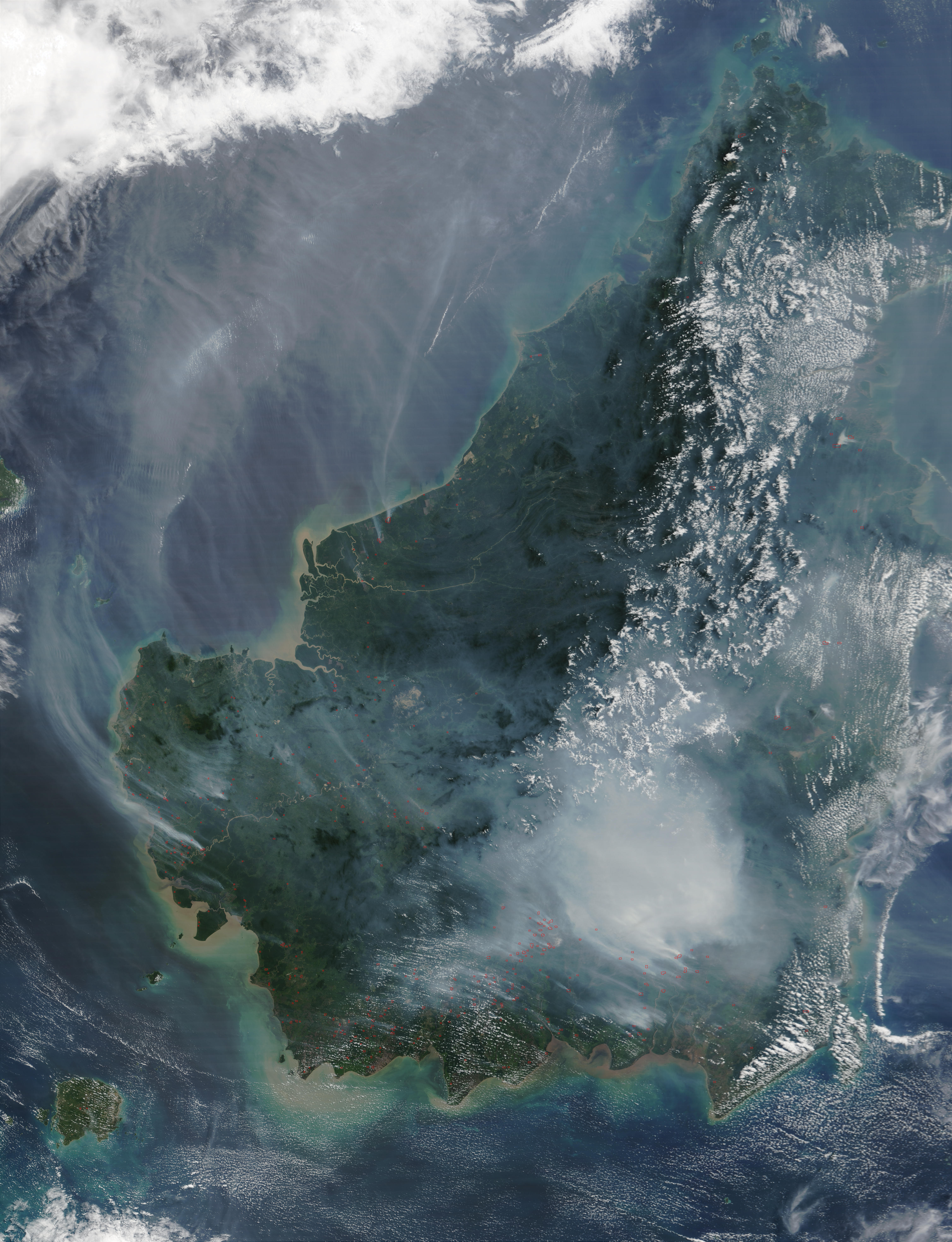
Satellite image of the island of Borneo on 19 August 2002, showing smoke from burning peat swamp forests

Inland and coastal peat differ greatly in their age, where coastal peat formed during the mid Holocene, about 8,000 years before present (YBP). Inland peat formed much earlier during the Late Pleistocene, more than 26,000 YBP. Coastal peat formation is highly affected by the sea level rise with strong accumulation around 8,000-4,000 YBP when El Niño is less intense. Because the Sunda Shelf is tectonically stable, the sea level change in this area is only affected by the eustatic sea level, and during the glacial period the Karimata Strait dried, causing Asian Peninsula, Sumatra, Borneo and Java to become connected. After the Last Glacial Maximum, this coastline moved inland as the ice sheet melted and finally reached the level of modern coastline around 8,500 YBP.

Inland peat formation is highly affected by climate with little or no effect of sea level rise because it located around 15–20 m (49–66 ft) above sea level, where the most recent record of higher sea level was 125,000 YBP when the sea level was 6 m above the modern level. Peat cores from Sebangau, South Kalimantan show a slow growth of 0.04 mm/y around 13,000 YBP when the climate was colder, then accelerated to 2.55mm/y around 9,900 YBP in warmer Early Holocene, then slower again to 0.23–0.15 mm/y during intense El Niño. A similar pattern is observed in cores from Sentarum, West Kalimantan, where the peat shows slower growth, which was caused by a drier climate during Heinrich Event I and the emergence of El Niño.

It has long been assumed that the peat underlying tropical peat swamp forests accumulates because the extreme conditions (waterlogged, nutrient poor, anaerobic and acidic) impede microbial activity. Studies in a tropical Malaysian peat swamp (North Selangor peat swamp forest) show that although the sclerophyllous, toxic leaves of endemic peat-forest plants (Macaranga pruinosa, Campnosperma coriaceum, Pandanus atrocarpus, Stenochlaena palustris) were barely decomposed by bacteria and fungi, the leaves of M. tanarius, another plant species, were almost completely decomposed after one year. Thus it is intrinsic properties of the leaves (that are adaptations to deter herbivory in the nutrient poor environment) that impede microbial breakdown.

== Ecology ==
Peat swamp forests are unusual ecosystems, with trees reaching as high in 70 m (230 ft) in South East Asia—vastly different from the peatlands of the north temperate and boreal zones (which are dominated by Sphagnum mosses, grasses, sedges and shrubs). The spongy, unstable, waterlogged, anaerobic beds of peat can be up to 20 m (66 ft) deep with low pH (pH 2.9 – 4) and low nutrients, and the forest floor is seasonally flooded. The water is stained dark brown by the tannins that leach from the fallen leaves and peat – hence the name blackwater swamps. During the dry season, the peat remains waterlogged, and pools remain among the trees. Water level on the peat is usually 20 cm (7.9 in) below the surface. During a severe El Nino, the water level might drop to 40 cm (16 in) below the surface and increase the risk of forest fire.

Peat forest contains high amount of carbon due to its soil nature, categorized as histosols with characteristics of high organic material content (70–99%). This carbon pool is stabilized by the low temperature on temperate peat, and by the waterlogging on tropical peat. Disturbances that change the temperature or the water content of the peat will release this stored carbon into the atmosphere, exacerbating human-made climate change. Estimation of carbon content of tropical peat ranges from 50 Gt carbon to 88 Gt carbon.

== In Indonesia ==
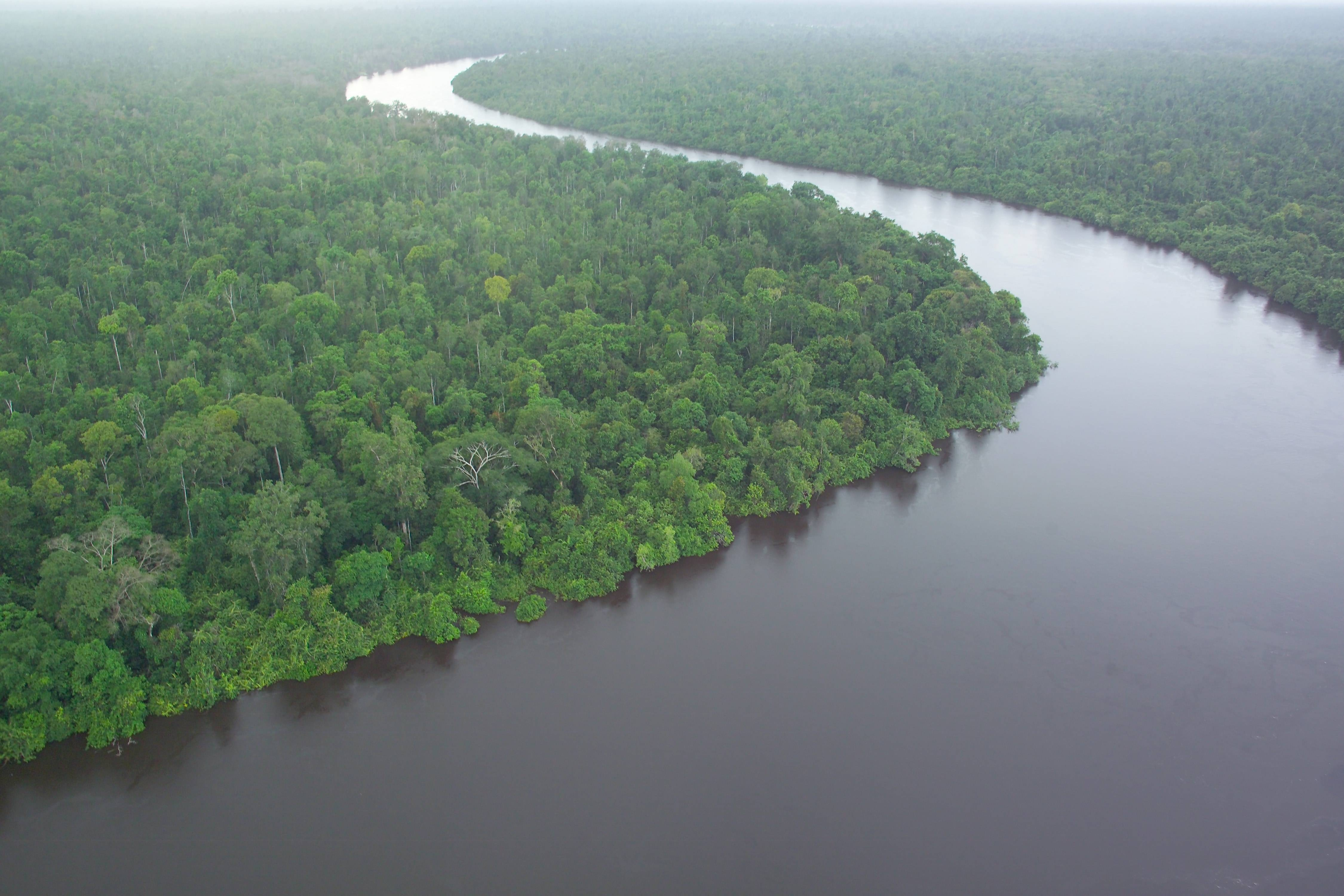
Peat swamp forest in Borneo

Peat swamp forests originally represented major ecosystems in Indonesia and ranged between 16.5 and 27 million hectares. In their original state, Indonesian peat swamp forests released between 0.01 and 0.03 Gt of carbon annually. In recent years, however, these important ecosystems have been reduced through deforestation, drainage, and conversion to agricultural lands and other activities. Their current status as carbon sequestering systems have thus also been reduced significantly. An understanding of the global importance of peat (and thus the urgency of maintaining peat swamp forests) and identifying alternative ways of making these areas productive in an environmentally sound and sustainable manner should have high priority among scientists and policy-makers alike.

Beginning in 1996 under the Mega Rice Project (MRP), the government of Indonesia drained over 1 million hectares of the Borneo peat swamp forests for conversion to agricultural land. Between 1996 and 1998, more than 4,000 kilometers of drainage and irrigation channels were dug, and deforestation accelerated in part through legal and illegal logging and in part through burning. The water channels, roads, and railways built for legal forestry opened up the region to illegal forestry. In the MRP area, forest cover dropped from 64.8% in 1991 to 45.7% in 2000. Most of the marketable trees were removed from the areas covered by the MRP. What happened was not what had been expected: the channels drained the peat forests rather than irrigating them. Where the forests had often flooded up to 2 meters deep in the rainy season, now their surface is dry at all times of the year. The Indonesian government abandoned the MRP in 1998.

A study for the European Space Agency found that up to 2.57 billion tons of carbon were released to the atmosphere in 1997 as a result of burning peat and vegetation in Indonesia. This is equivalent to 40% of the average annual global carbon emissions from fossil fuels, and contributed greatly to the largest annual increase in atmospheric CO_{2} concentration detected since records began in 1957. Additionally, fires in 2002–03 released between 200 million to 1 billion tons of carbon into the atmosphere. As a result Indonesia became the world's third largest carbon emitter.

Indonesia contains 50% of tropical peat swamps and 10% of dry land in the world. They have the potential of playing an important role in mitigating global warming and climate change under the reducing emissions from deforestation and forest degradation (REDD+) scheme. Rather than reducing deforestation—in terms of claiming carbon credits from REDD+ initiatives—peatland conservation and rehabilitation are more efficient undertakings, due to the much larger reduced emissions achievable per unit area and the much lower opportunity costs involved.

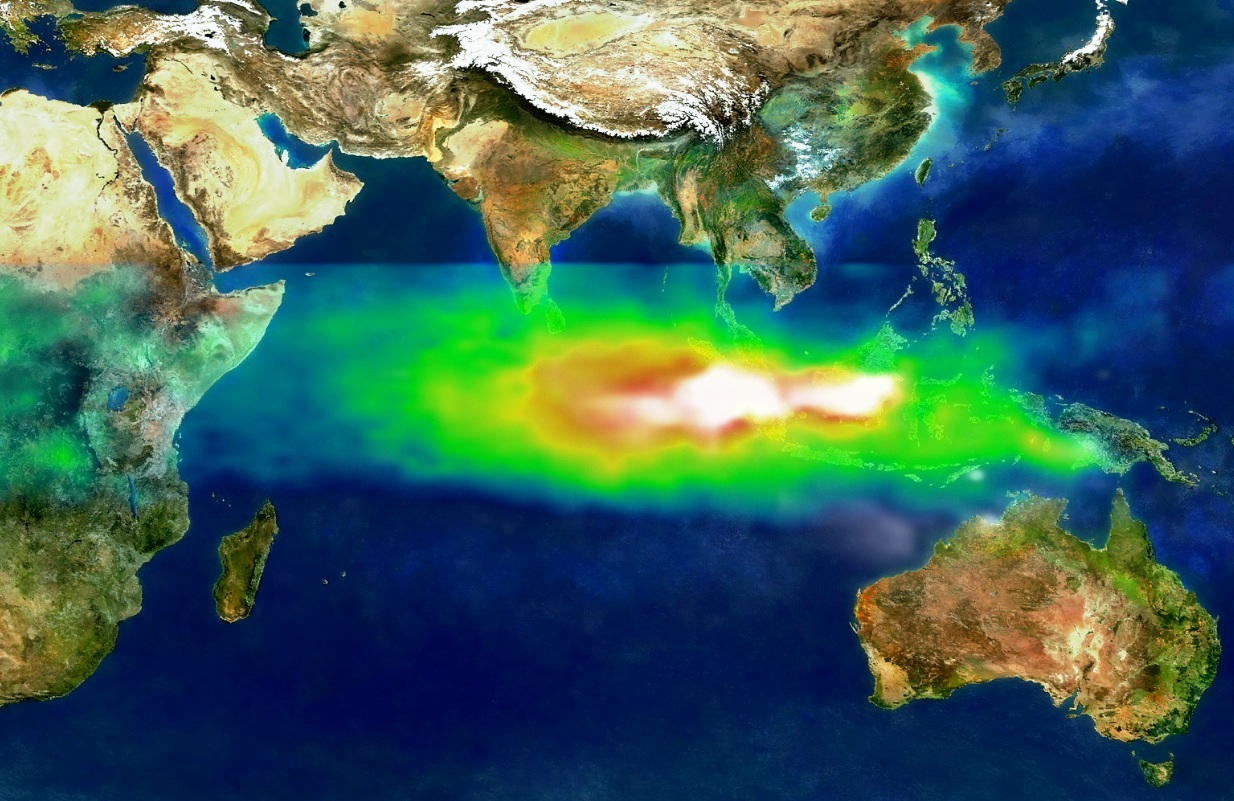
Air pollution over Southeast Asia in October 1997

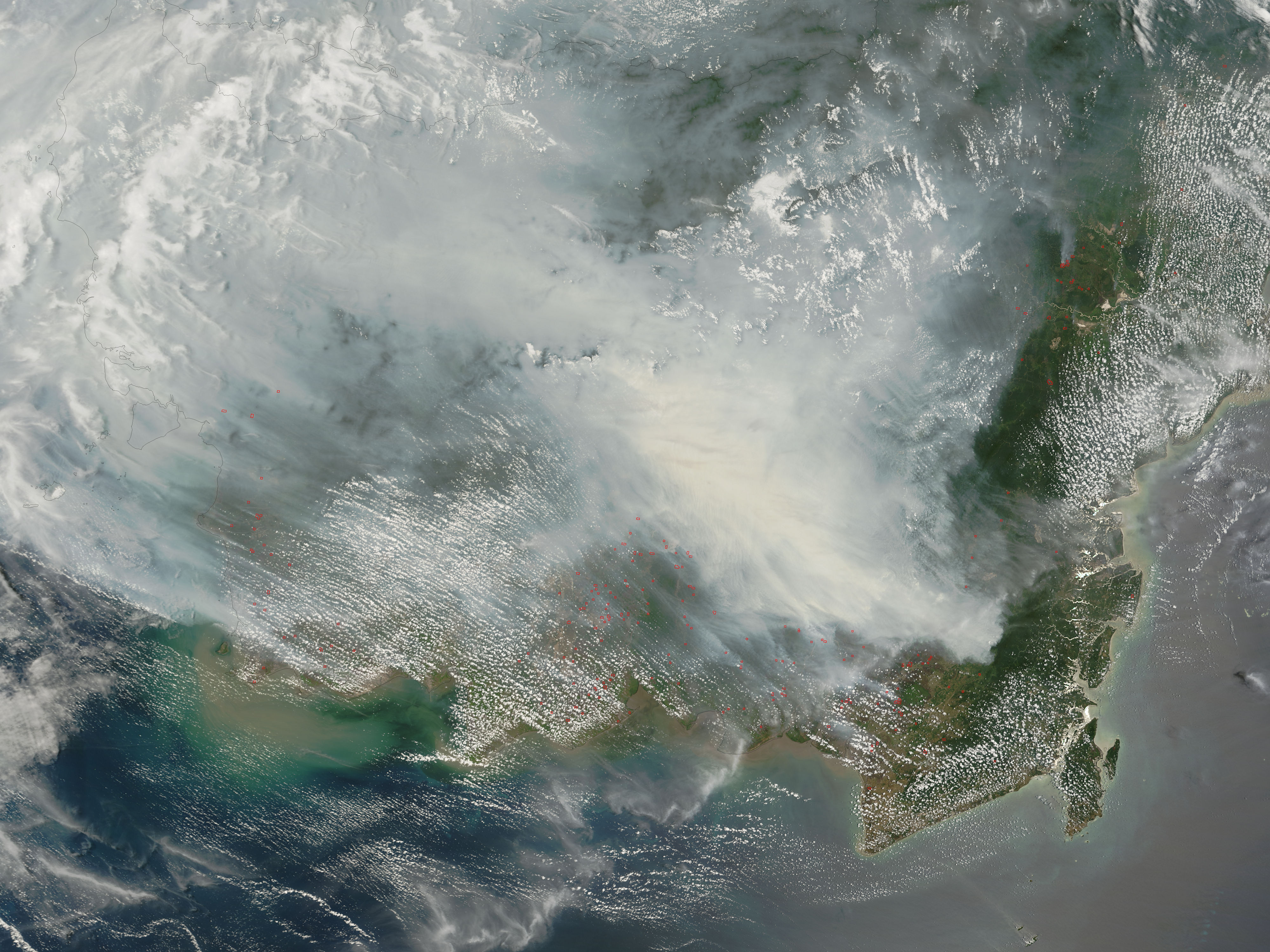
Satellite photograph of the haze above Borneo on 5 October 2006

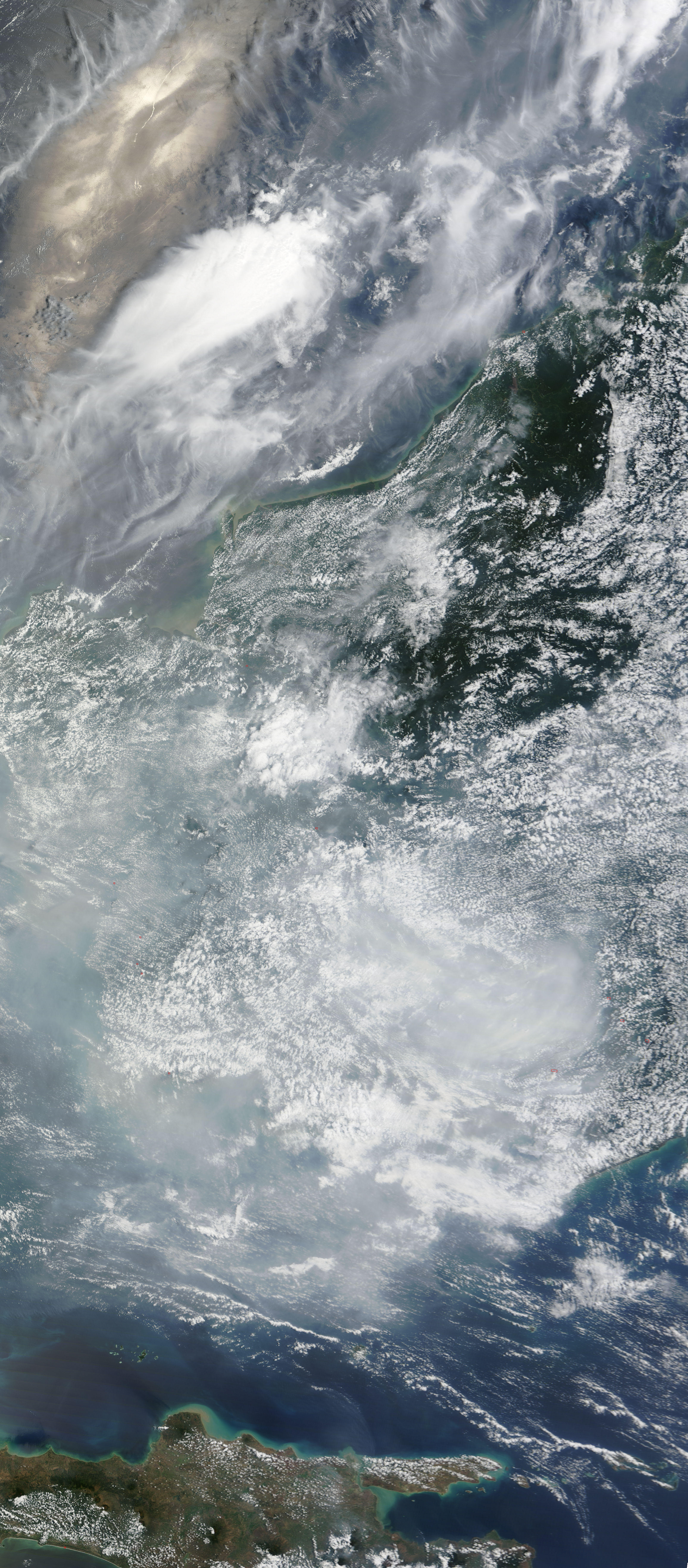
Borneo lowlands to the north-west and south-east shrouded with thick, grey smoke from dozens of fires in this satellite image from 2009

=== Conservation and preservation ===
Attempts to preserve tropical peat swamp forests have been minimal in comparison to the widespread impact and devastation of commercial logging; in Sarawak, logging is ongoing and planned to intensify in Brunei. One plan by the environmental NGO Borneo Orangutan Survival is to preserve the peat swamp forest of Mawas using a combination of carbon finance and debt-for-nature-swap. About 6% of the original peat-forest area is contained within protected areas, the largest of which are Tanjung Puting and Sabangau National Parks.

The main causes of deforestation in Indonesia continue to be palm oil business (see palm oil production in Indonesia) and illegal logging, ongoing in areas such as South Sumatra. A survey by the University of Muhammadiyah Palembang in 2008 estimated that in 25 years most of the natural forests will be depleted due to illegal logging. Projects by REDD are designed to tackle deforestation and protect forests from the encroachment of agriculture, benefitting biodiversity and improving the quality of the environment to surrounding villages.

To counter the destruction of mangroves and unsustainable palm oil expansion in Indonesia's peatlands, organizations, such as Wetlands International, work with the Indonesian government to improve policies and spatial planning. They engage with the palm-oil industry, promoting best management practices in tropical peat swamp forests and ensuring the participation of local communities, who lack awareness about natural resource management. In the field, they work with communities to restore mangroves and peatlands.

Habitat disturbance caused by logging was shown to affect orangutan density within a mixed swamp forest. The presence of a very large, self-sustaining orangutan population in this region emphasizes the urgency for greater protection of Kalimantan's peat swamp forests in light of recent and rapid habitat degradation.

== Ecoregions ==
- Borneo peat swamp forests (Brunei, Indonesia, Malaysia)
- Eastern Congolian swamp forests (Central African Republic, Democratic Republic of the Congo)
- Peninsular Malaysian peat swamp forests (Malaysia, Thailand)
- Ratargul Swamp Forest (Sylhet District, Bangladesh)
- Sumatran peat swamp forests (Indonesia)
- Tonle Sap-Mekong peat swamp forests (Cambodia, Vietnam)
- Brazil, Argentina (South America)

== See also ==
- Bog – Type of wetland with peat-rich soil
- Coal forest – Land type during the late Carboniferous and Permian
- 1997 Southeast Asian haze – Haze over the Southeast Asia region in mid-1997
- 2006 Southeast Asian haze – Air pollution event in Southeast Asia
- Tropical peat – Soil type
- Deforestation in Borneo
- Deforestation in Indonesia
- Social and environmental impact of palm oil
- Environmental issues in Indonesia
- The Burning Season – 2008 film by Cathy Henkel
- Pig Feast - 2026 film
