= Sabangau National Park =

National park in Indonesia

- IUCN category II (national park)
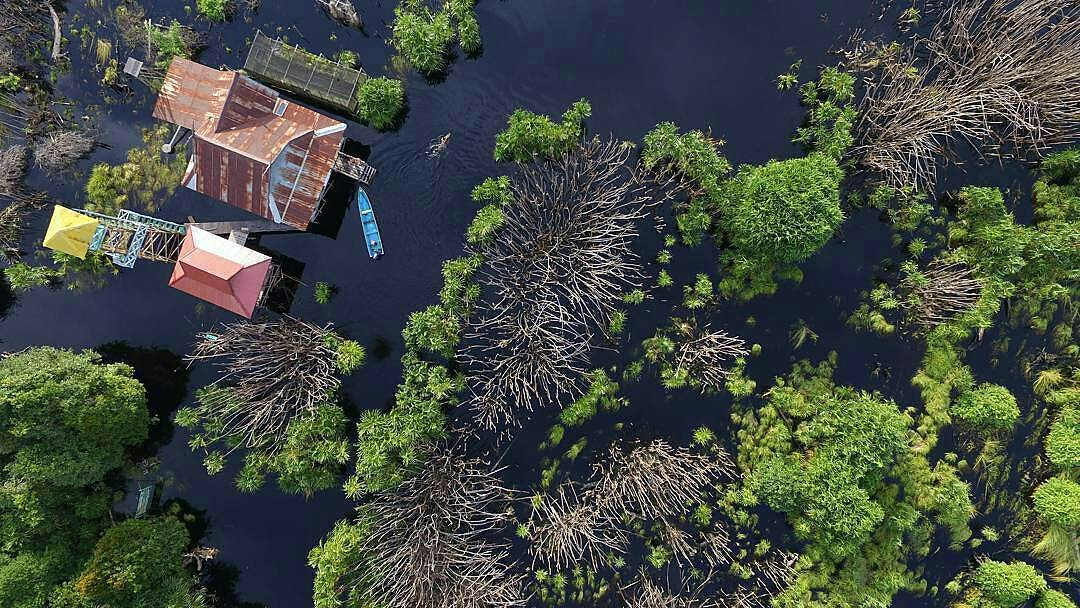
- Sabangau River and surrounding peat swamp forests

- Location within Central Kalimantan Location within Kalimantan Location within Indonesia
- Location: Central Kalimantan, Indonesia
- Nearest city: Palangka Raya
- Coordinates: 2°35′S 113°40′E
- Area: 5,687 km^{2} (2,196 sq mi)
- Established: 2004
- Governing body: Ministry of Forestry

Sabangau National Park (Indonesian: Taman Nasional Sabangau) is a national park in Central Kalimantan, a province of Indonesia in Kalimantan, the Indonesian part of the island of Borneo established in 2004. Between 1980 and 1995 the site was a massive logging concessions area. After 1995, the park became a site for illegal logging, which resulted in up to 85 percent of the 568,700-hectare total park area being destroyed. By 2012, less than 1 percent of the park's total area has been reforested and at the current rate, it will take several centuries to restore it to its pre-logged state.

== Geography ==
The national park is centered on Sabangau River, a blackwater river. It flows through the Kelompok Hutan Kahayan or Sabangau peat swamp forest (5,300 km^{2}), between the Katingan and Kahayan rivers. The peat swamp forest is a dual ecosystem, with diverse tropical trees standing on a 10m - 12m layer of peat - partly decayed and waterlogged plant material - which in turn covers relatively infertile soil.

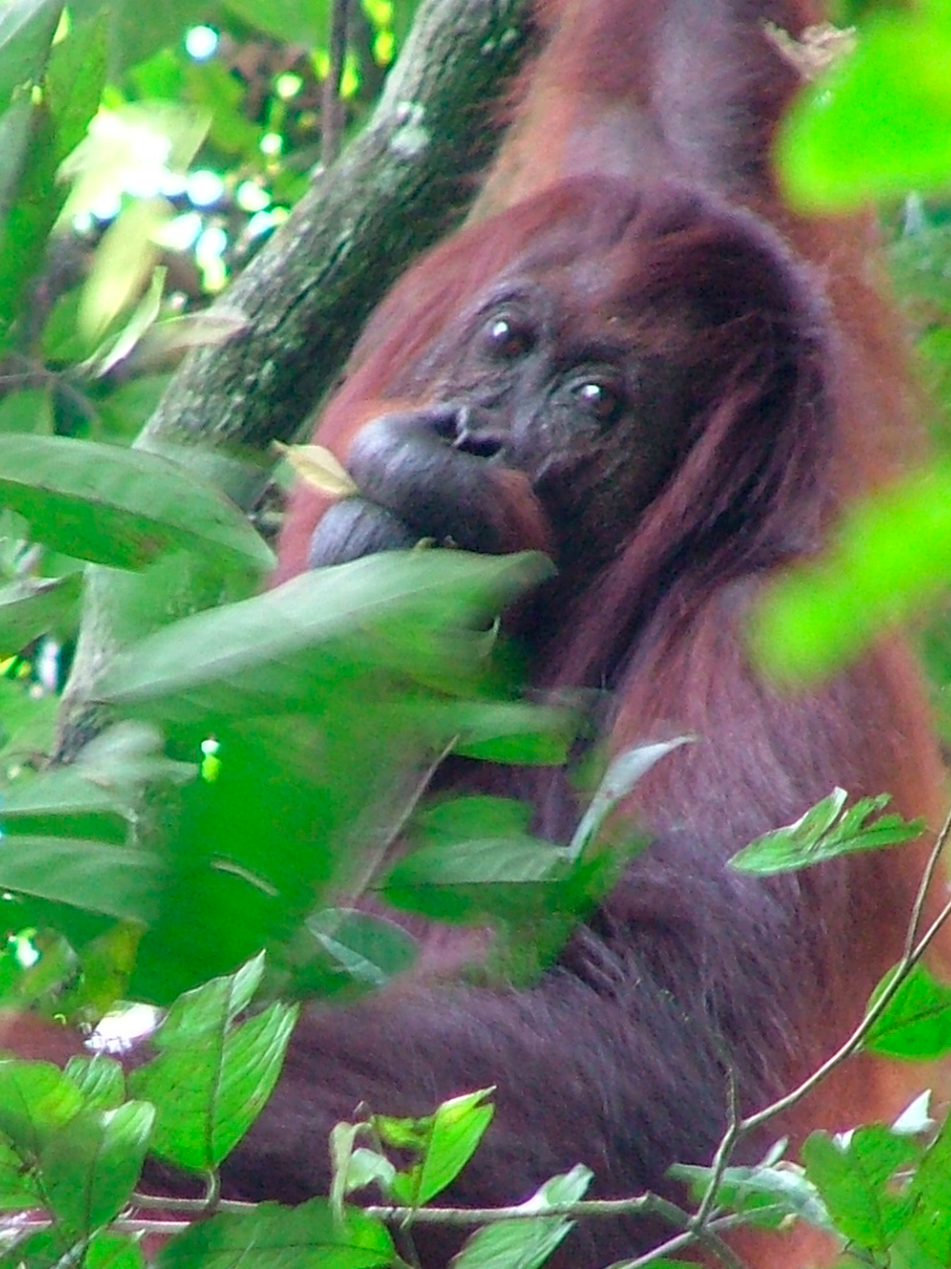
Orangutan in Sabah, Borneo

The severely degraded eastern part of the forest, between the Sabangau and the Kayahan, is officially designated for agriculture. However, since the failure of the Mega Rice Project, which drained large areas of peat forest in an attempt to create rice paddies, no further efforts are being made to make it suitable for this purpose.

The forest has been damaged by legal and illegal forestry. There is no longer any continuous forest cover where orangutans may cross the river. A satellite view shows a grid of logging roads throughout most of the forest.

However, the western part is now protected as either National Park or National Laboratory Research Area. A study of the area shows that the hydrological integrity of the forest has been maintained, and it is therefore ecologically resilient, although since it is close to the regional capital Palangkaraya it remains at risk.

== Ecology ==
The forest is home to the world's largest orangutan population, estimated at 6,910 individuals in 2003, and other rare or unique species. The total Bornean white-bearded gibbon population in the Sabangau catchment is estimated to be in the tens of thousands, but is declining fast. Efforts are underway to establish long-term ecological monitoring in the forest.

Vulnerable bird species include the large green pigeon (Treron capellei) and possibly Storm's stork (Ciconia stormi) and lesser adjutant (Leptoptilus javanicus). Some 150,000 ha of swamp forest has been recognised as an Important Bird Area (IBA) by BirdLife International.
