= Maludam National Park =

National park in Malaysia

- Taman Negara Maludam
- IUCN category II (national park)
- Location within East Malaysia
- Location: Sarawak, Malaysia
- Coordinates: 1°32′56″N 111°05′31″E
- Area: 432 km^{2} (167 sq mi)
- Established: 2000
- Governing body: Sarawak Forestry Department

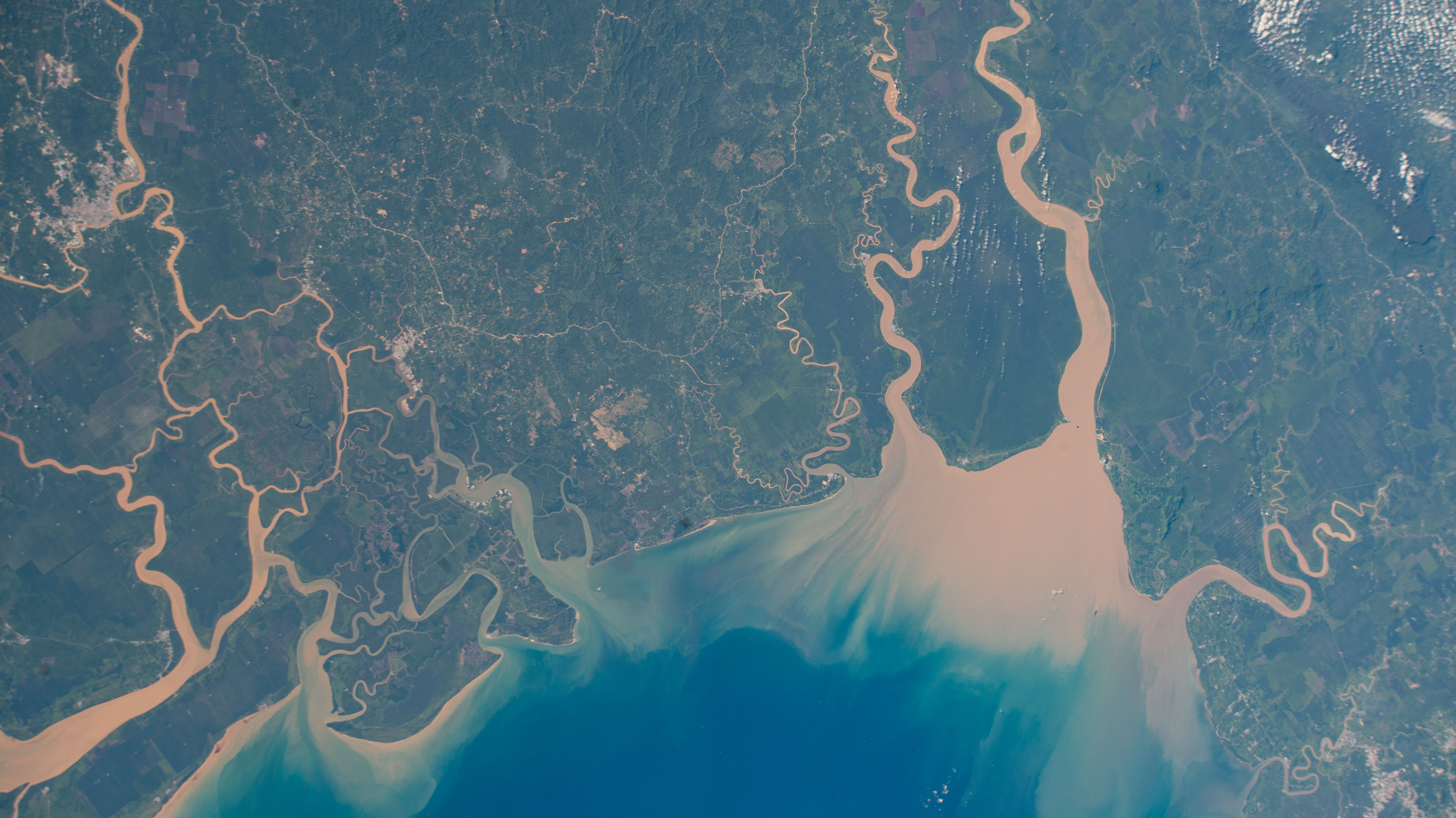
Maludam National Park photographed by the International Space Station in 2022

Maludam National Park (Malay: Taman Negara Maludam) is a national park in Betong Division, Sarawak, Malaysia on the island of Borneo. It is located in the Maludam Peninsula and consists entirely of low-lying, flat peat swamp forest. Such forests cover about 10% of the total land area of Sarawak, but have mostly been exploited for timber and plantation agriculture. The Maludam National Park encompasses the largest single patch of peat swamp forest remaining in Sarawak and Brunei.

The park covers an area of 432 square kilometres (167 mi^{2}) and was founded in 2000. It is the second largest national park in Sarawak, and there are proposals to extend its area yet further. These national park is currently has no facilities and also strictly not open to any visitors and tourists.

== Fauna ==
Maludam National Park also has the only viable population of the red banded langur (Presbytis chrysomelas cruciger) remaining in the world today. This species is one of the world's most beautiful monkeys, and is endemic only to Borneo. Its current range is restricted entirely to the peat swamp forests of the Sri Aman Division and Sarikei Division of Sarawak.

Maludam National Park also has one of only about five viable populations of proboscis monkey (Nasalis larvatus) in Sarawak. There is also a significant population of silvery lutung (Trachypithecus cristata). Diversity of other mammals is low, but there are numerous birds in the park, including black, Oriental pied and rhinoceros hornbills, blue-eared and stork-billed kingfishers, green imperial pigeon, slender-billed crow, greater racket-tailed drongo and, occasionally, the rare Storm's stork.

== See also ==
- Geography of Malaysia
