= Deforestation in Borneo =

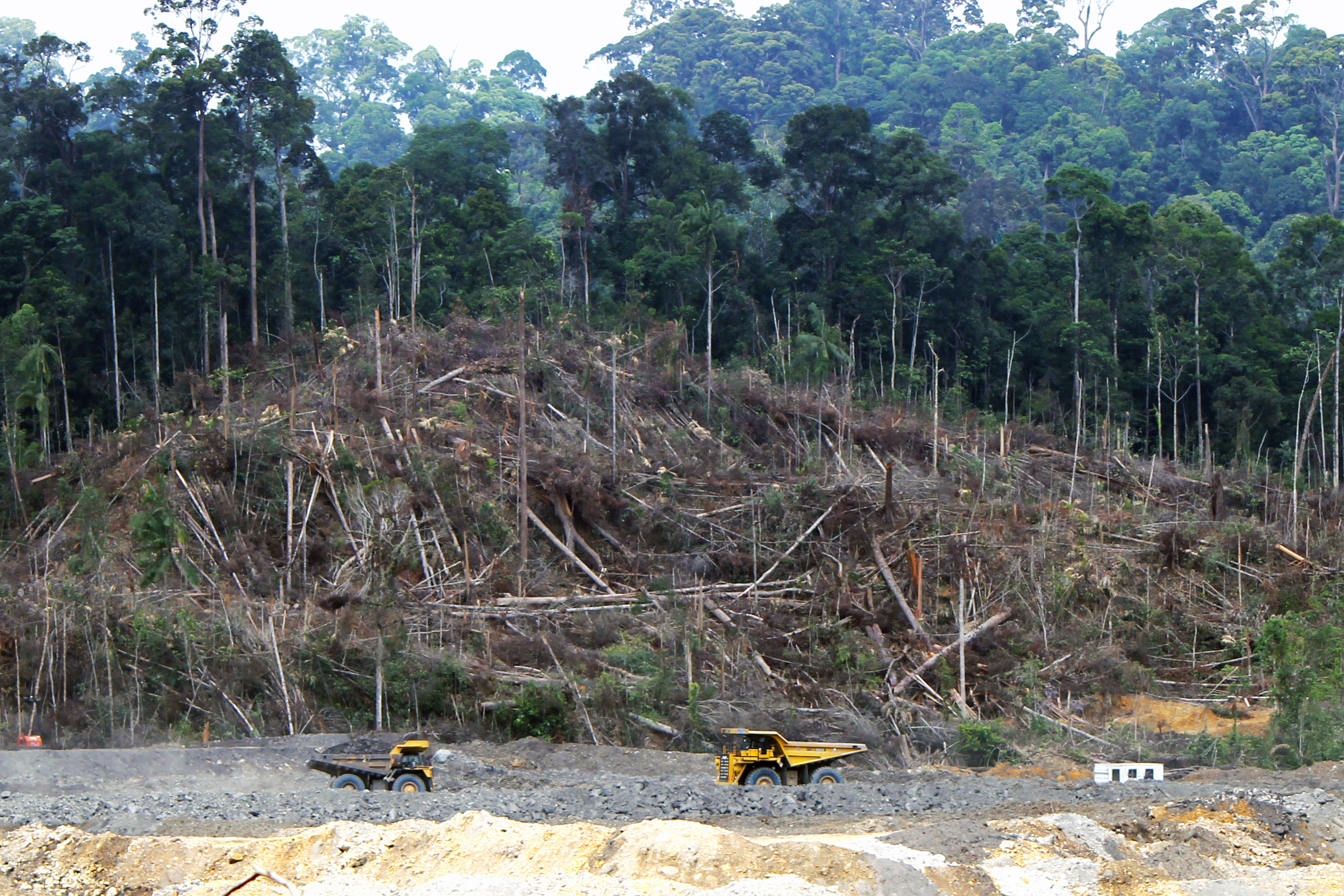
Trees being felled in Kalimantan, the Indonesian part of Borneo, in 2013, to make way for a new coal mining project

Deforestation in Borneo has taken place on an industrial scale since the 1960s. Borneo, the third largest island in the world, divided between Indonesia, Malaysia and Brunei, was once covered by dense tropical and subtropical rainforests; rainforests that because of deforestation have produced more wood in recent years than Africa and the Amazon combined.

In the 1980s and 1990s, the forests of Borneo were levelled at a rate unprecedented in human history, burned, logged and cleared, and commonly replaced with agriculture. The deforestation continued through the 2000s at a slower pace, alongside the expansion of palm oil plantations. Half of the annual global tropical timber procurement is from Borneo. Palm oil plantations are rapidly encroaching on the last remnants of primary rainforest. Seen in the direct correlation that exists between deforestation in Borneo and plantation production. For example, since 2020, 92% of deforested land was converted into a plantation in less than a year.

The World Wildlife Fund divides Borneo into a number of distinct ecoregions including the Borneo lowland rain forests which cover most of the island, with an area of 427,500 square kilometres (165,100 sq mi), the Borneo peat swamp forests, the Kerangas or Sundaland heath forests, the Southwest Borneo freshwater swamp forests, and the Sunda Shelf mangroves. The Borneo mountain rainforests lie in the central highlands of the island, above the 1,000 metres (3,300 ft) elevation. These areas represent habitat for many endangered species; for example, orangutans, elephants and rare endemics such as the elusive Hose's civet. The Bornean orangutan has been a critically endangered species since 2016. The same year that deforestation reached an all-time high partially due to plantation expansion. During this period, a variety of organisms have seen a decrease in biodiversity. This partially being due to the El Niño fires occurring at that time. These were a series of fires that occurred over the course of the years 1980 to 2016 that led to many detrimental effects throughout Borneo. Because of the drought, spike in CO2 levels, loss in habitat, and loss in safe accessible water, many animals saw a decline in their populations

In addition to Borneo's importance in biodiversity conservation and as a carbon sink, the forests have significance for water security and food sovereignty for local communities of Indigenous peoples.

== Malaysian Borneo ==
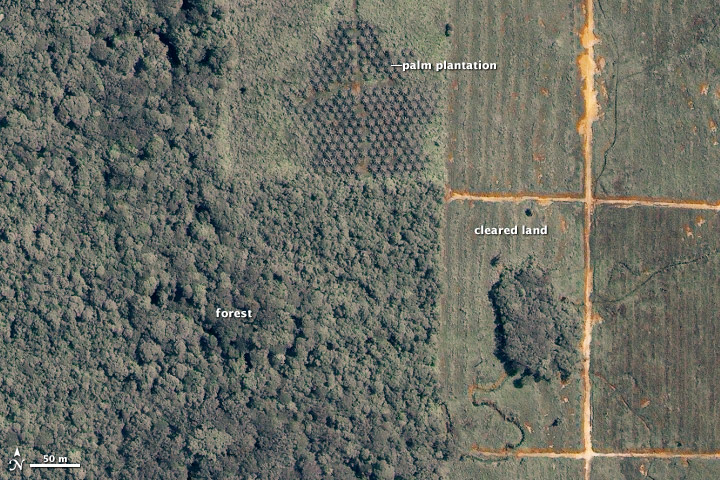
Satellite image of rainforest converted to oil palm plantations.

The Malaysian states of Sarawak and Sabah (East Malaysia), in the north, occupy about 26% of the island. The forested area here shrank rapidly due to heavy logging for the Malaysian plywood industry. Two forestry researchers of Sepilok Research Centre, Sandakan, Sabah in the early 1980s identified four fast-growing hardwoods and a breakthrough on seed collection and handling of Acacia mangium and Gmelina arborea, fast-growing tropical trees were planted on a huge tract of formerly logged and deforested areas primarily in the northern part of Borneo Island.

Indigenous peoples of Malaysia have been impacted by logging without their free, prior and informed consent in their ancestral forests. They have used peaceful demonstrations, social media advocacy, and blockades to raise awareness of their rights to the forest, with some success. Questions about how and why logging licenses were granted without community consent remain unaddressed.

The Dayak people are indigenous to the region, and they have been in the process of actively trying to limit deforestation in the area. This is because, they partially rely on the forest for their ethnic identity, this being through existing rivers and soils. In addition to this, there are certain parts of the forest that are considered sacred to them, the Pahewan area. The Pahewan area is a region of land determined upon settlement. It is an area in which spirits of the forest can relocate to upon the moving of locations. It is a sacred area.

The Dayak people of this region primarily align with the Kaharingan Hinduism beliefs, where every living being has a gana (spirit) living in it. They believe that in order to advance into the sacred Pahewan region, one must ask the spirit that inhabits it for permission through a customary ceremony called manyanggar. When a ceremony is not conducted, they believe detrimental things can happen to them and their communities. The Pahewan area is being threatened by threats of plantations everyday.

The rainforest was also greatly destroyed by the forest fires of 1997 to 1998, which were started by the locals to clear the forests for crops and perpetuated by an exceptionally dry El Niño season during that period. During the great fire, hotspots could be seen on satellite images and the haze thus created affected the surrounding countries of Brunei, Malaysia, Indonesia and Singapore. In February 2008, the Malaysian government announced the Sarawak Corridor of Renewable Energy plan to harvest the virgin hinterlands of northern Borneo. Further deforestation and destruction of the biodiversity are anticipated in the wake of logging commissions, hydroelectric dams and other mining of minerals and resources.

== Indonesian Borneo ==
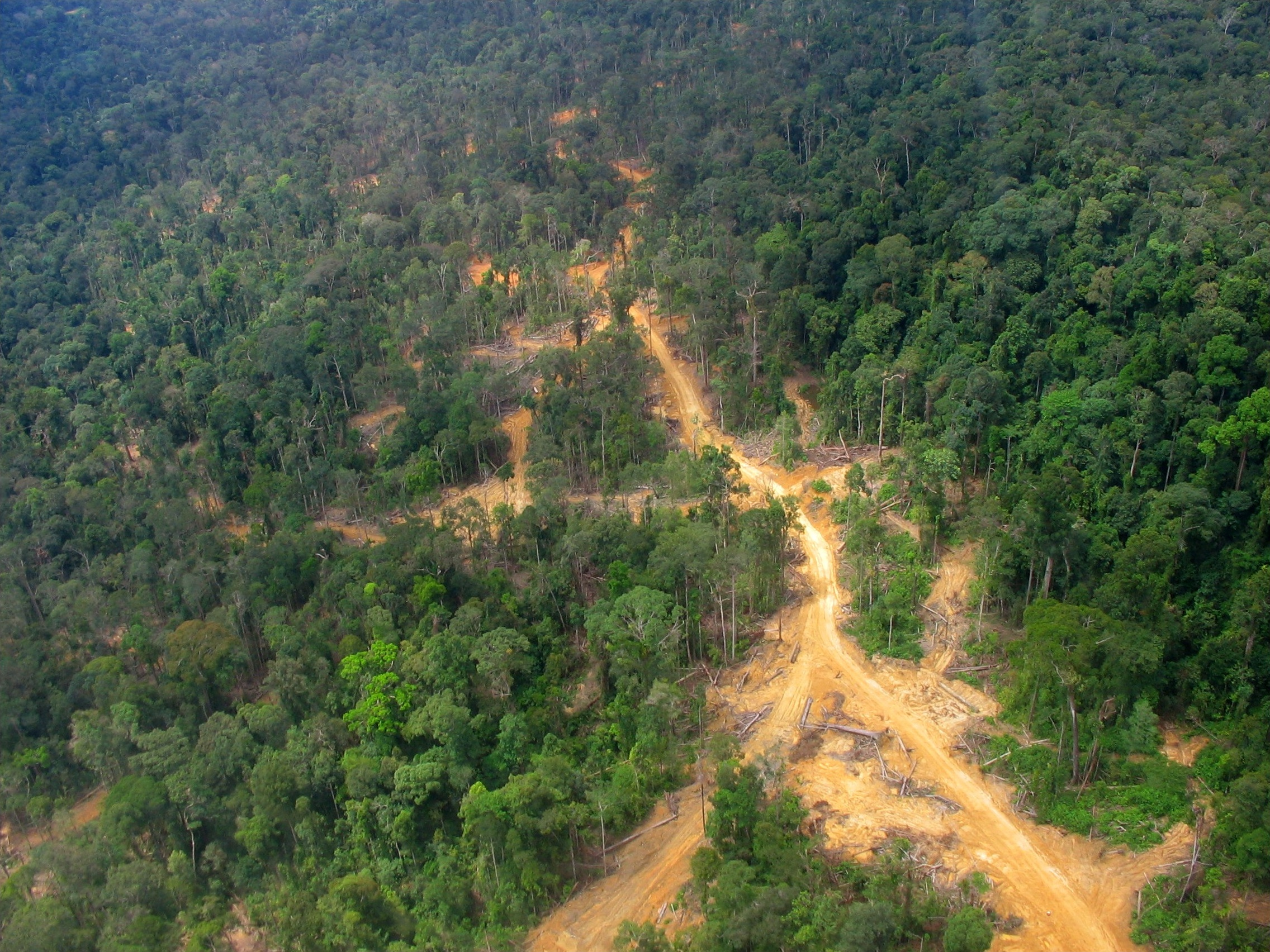
Logging road and impacts in East Kalimantan: logged forest on the left, primary forest on the right

Approximately 73% of the island is Indonesian territory; the Indonesian name for the island, Kalimantan, is used in English to refer to the Indonesian-controlled territory.

To combat overpopulation in Java, the Indonesian government started a massive transmigration (transmigrasi) of poor farmers and landless peasants into Borneo in the 1970s and 1980s, to farm the logged areas, albeit with little success as the fertility of the land has been removed with the trees and what soil remains is washed away in tropical downpours.

The Mega Rice Project was initiated in 1996 in the southern sections of Kalimantan. The goal was to turn one million hectares of "unproductive" and sparsely populated peat swamp forest into rice paddies in an effort to alleviate Indonesia's growing food shortage. The government made a significant investment in constructing irrigation canals and removing trees. The project did not succeed, and was eventually abandoned after causing considerable damage to the environment.

The peat swamp forest in the south of Kalimantan is an unusual ecology home to many unique or rare species such as orangutans and slow-growing but valuable trees. The peat swamp forest is a dual ecosystem, with diverse tropical trees standing on a 10 to 12 m layer of peat - partly decayed and waterlogged plant material – which in turn covers relatively infertile soil. Peat is a major store of carbon. If broken down and burned it contributes to CO_{2} emissions, considered a source of global warming.

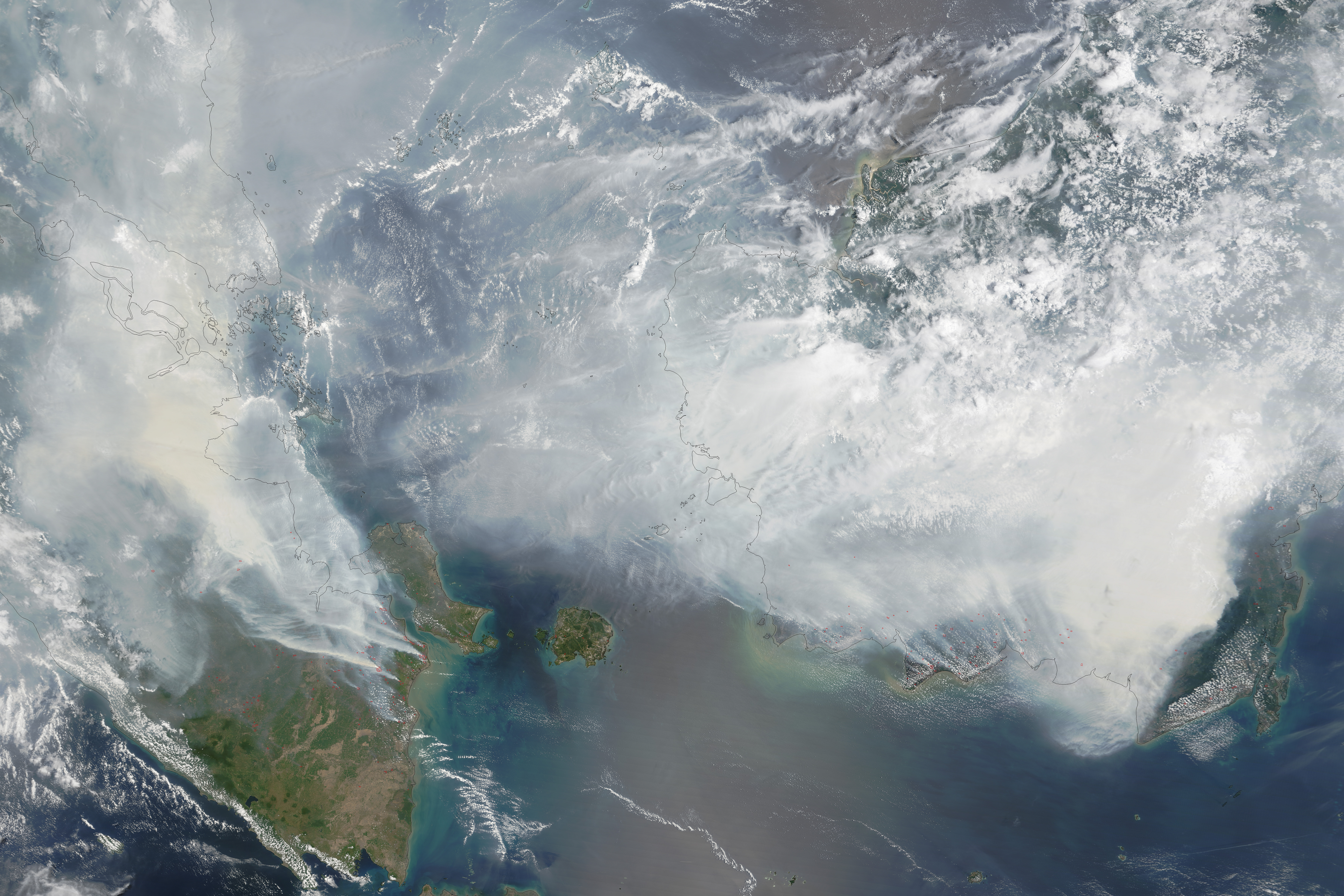
A NASA satellite image showing the extent of 2015 Southeast Asian haze on 24 September 2015.

The water channels, and the roads and railways built for legal forestry, opened up the region to illegal forestry. In the MRP area, forest cover dropped from 64.8% in 1991 to 45.7% in 2000, and clearance has continued since then. It appears that almost all the marketable trees have now been removed from the areas covered by the MRP.

It turned out that the channels drained the peat forests rather than irrigating them. Where the forests had often flooded up to 2m deep in the rainy season, now their surface is dry at all times of the year. The government has therefore abandoned the MRP, but the drying peat is vulnerable to fires which continue to break out on a massive scale.

After drainage, fires ravaged the area, destroying remaining forest and wildlife along with new agriculture, filling the air above Borneo and beyond with dense smoke and haze and releasing enormous quantities of CO_{2} into the atmosphere. The destruction had a major negative impact on the livelihoods of people in the area. It caused major smog-related health problems amongst half a million people, who suffered from respiratory problems.

Peat forest destruction is causing sulphuric acid pollution of the rivers. In the rainy seasons, the canals are discharging acidic water with a high ratio of pyritic sulphate into rivers up to 150 km upstream from the river mouth. This may be a factor contributing to lower fish catches.

A joint UK-Indonesian study of the timber industry in Indonesia as a whole in 1998 suggested that about 40% of the throughput of timber was illegal, with a value in excess of $365 million. More recent estimates, comparing legal harvesting against known domestic consumption plus exports, suggest that 88% of logging in the country is illegal in some way. Malaysia is the key transit country for illegally logged wood products from Indonesia.

== Logging ==
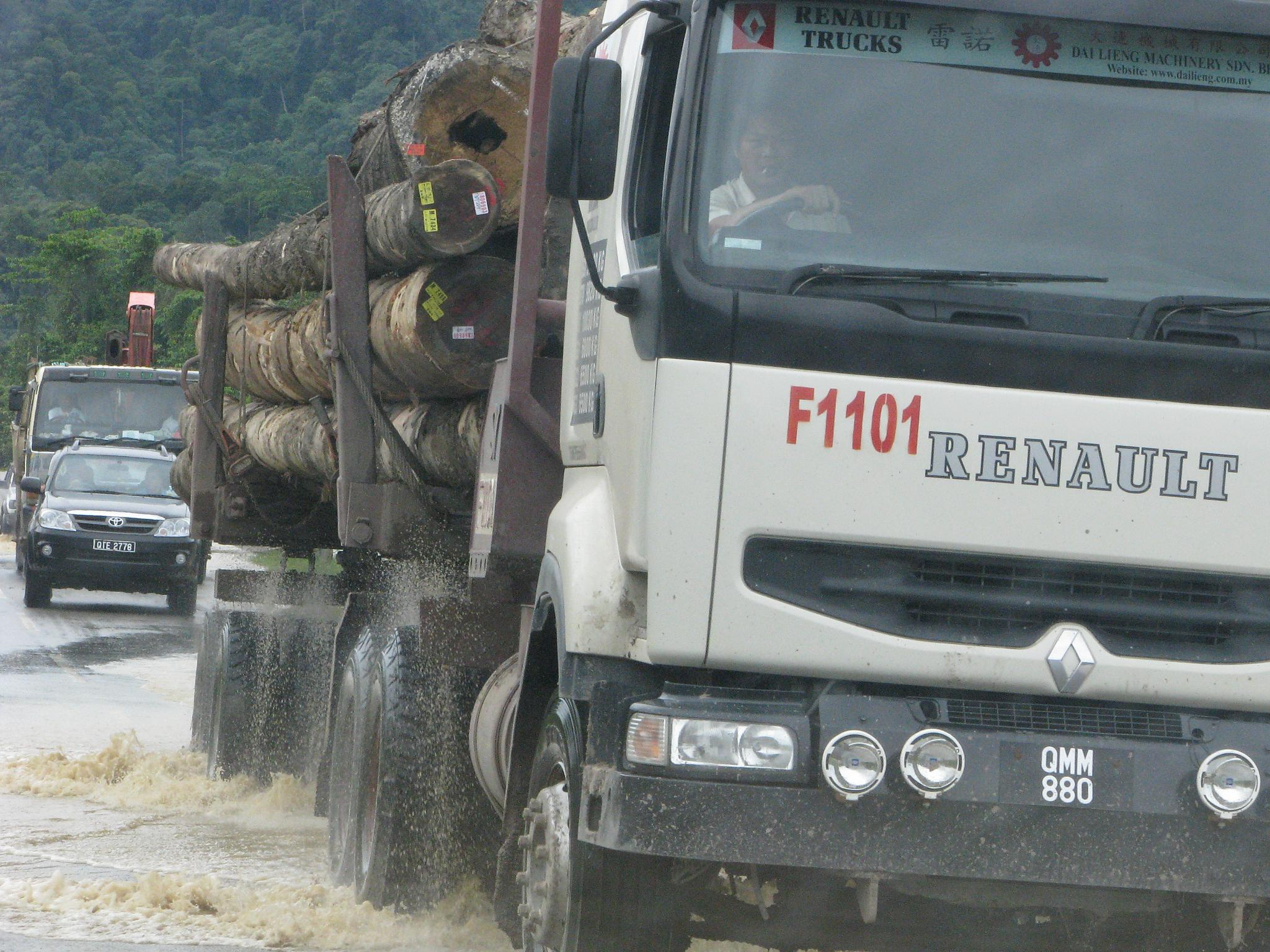
A logging truck in Sarawak, Borneo.

Deforestation in Borneo was historically low due to infertile soils, unfavorable climate, and the presence of disease. Deforestation only began in earnest during the mid-twentieth century. Industrial logging rose in the 1970s as Malaysia depleted its peninsular forests, and former Indonesian strongman President Suharto distributed large tracts of forest to cement political relationships with army generals. Thus, logging expanded significantly in the 1980s, with logging roads providing access to remote lands for settlers and developers. There became such an abundance of roads that if all the roads built in 1990 to 2009 in Malaysian Borneo and Brunei were aligned end to end, the length would be enough to circle the Earth a total of nine times.

Logging in Borneo in the 1980s and 1990s was some of the most intensive the world has ever seen, with 60–240 cubic meters of wood being harvested per hectare versus 23 cubic meters per hectare in the Amazon. In Kalimantan for example, some 80% of lowlands went to timber concessions, including virtually all its mangrove forests. In Sabah and Sarawak (states in Borno) there was just 22% of untouched forest that remained. The rest was logged. There were even some forests in those regions that were repeatedly logged: two to four times to be specific. By the late 1980s, it became clear that Indonesia and Malaysia were facing a problem of timber crisis due to over-logging. Demand from timber mills was far-outstripping log production in both Malaysia and Indonesia.

== Fires ==
Most fires in Borneo are set for land-clearing purposes. While the Indonesian government has historically blamed small-scale swidden agriculturalists for fires, World Wildlife Fund notes that satellite mapping has revealed that commercial development for large-scale land conversion – in particular oil palm plantations – was the largest single cause of the infamous 1997–1998 fires. Today fires are still set annually for land clearing in agricultural areas and degraded forests. When conditions are dry, these fires can easily spread to adjacent forest land and burn out of control. Increasingly, the frequency and intensity of fires is causing political tensions in the region. Neighbouring countries, in particular Malaysia and Singapore, blame Indonesia for failing to control the fires. In turn, Indonesia accuses Malaysian firms of starting many of the fires for land-clearing process.

Sustainable management of the forest's resources, particularly logging, has been proposed. One perspective is that protection and conservation of the forest do not solely lie in the hands of Indonesia and/or Malaysia, and that it is unreasonable to assume that the few indebted countries that contain the majority of remaining rain forest should be responsible for single-handedly providing this global public good. This view holds that protecting the rainforest is a global effort which, in turn, will help to solve the development problems Indonesia and Malaysia face with regards to the Borneo rainforest.

== Reforestation ==
Recently a reforestation project in East Kalimantan has reported some success. The Borneo Orangutan Survival Foundation (BOS), founded by Dr Willie Smits, bought up nearly 2,000 ha of deforested degraded land in East Kalimantan that had suffered from mechanical logging, drought and severe fires and was covered in alang-alang grass (Imperata cylindrica). The intention was to restore the rainforest and provide a safe haven for rehabilitated orangutans while at the same time providing a source of income for local people. The project was given the name Samboja Lestari, which roughly translates as the "everlasting conservation of Samboja". 1°2′44″S 116°59′15″E Reforestation and rehabilitation is the core of the project, with hundreds of indigenous species planted. By the middle of 2006 more than 740 different tree species had been planted.

In the Lamandau Wildlife Reserve, Orangutan Foundation have planted over 60,000 saplings as part of their Forest Restoration Programme. These saplings were planted in order to reforest and rejuvenate areas damaged by fires.

There have also been reforestation efforts seen in two sites near the villages of Laman Satong and Sedahan Jaya. Birds were placed in each site to see how effective the reforestation efforts in those areas were. It was seen later that over the course of five years (2011 to 2016), the bird populations were increasing by 27% per year across both sites. The reforestation was working, and it helped to combat the loss in biodiversity that was seen due to the extensive deforestation efforts.

A project that has also contributed to the combatting of biodiversity loss is the ongoing Sow-A-Seed project in Sabah, Borneo. It began in 1998 and since then it has been trying to reforest 18,500 hectares of tree lost due to deforestation using three methods: making efforts to facilitate natural regeneration, planting in small clusters, and planting in rows. So far, the trees planted have decreased in mortality rates as the years have gone on, leading them to believe that their reforestation efforts were working to some degree. There has been a rise in species observed in this area as well. Animals such as orangutangs, elephants, and several wildcat species have been seen returning to the area.

== See also ==
- 1997 Southeast Asian haze
- 2006 Southeast Asian haze
- Borneo peat swamp forests
- Bruno Manser
- The Burning Season, a 2008 documentary about the burning of rainforests in Indonesia
- Deforestation in Indonesia
- Deforestation in Malaysia
- Indigenous rainforest blockades in Sarawak
- Environmental issues in Indonesia
- Heart of Borneo
- Mega Rice Project (Kalimantan)
- Palm oil production in Indonesia
- Sarawak Report, investigative journalism website
- Social and environmental impact of palm oil
