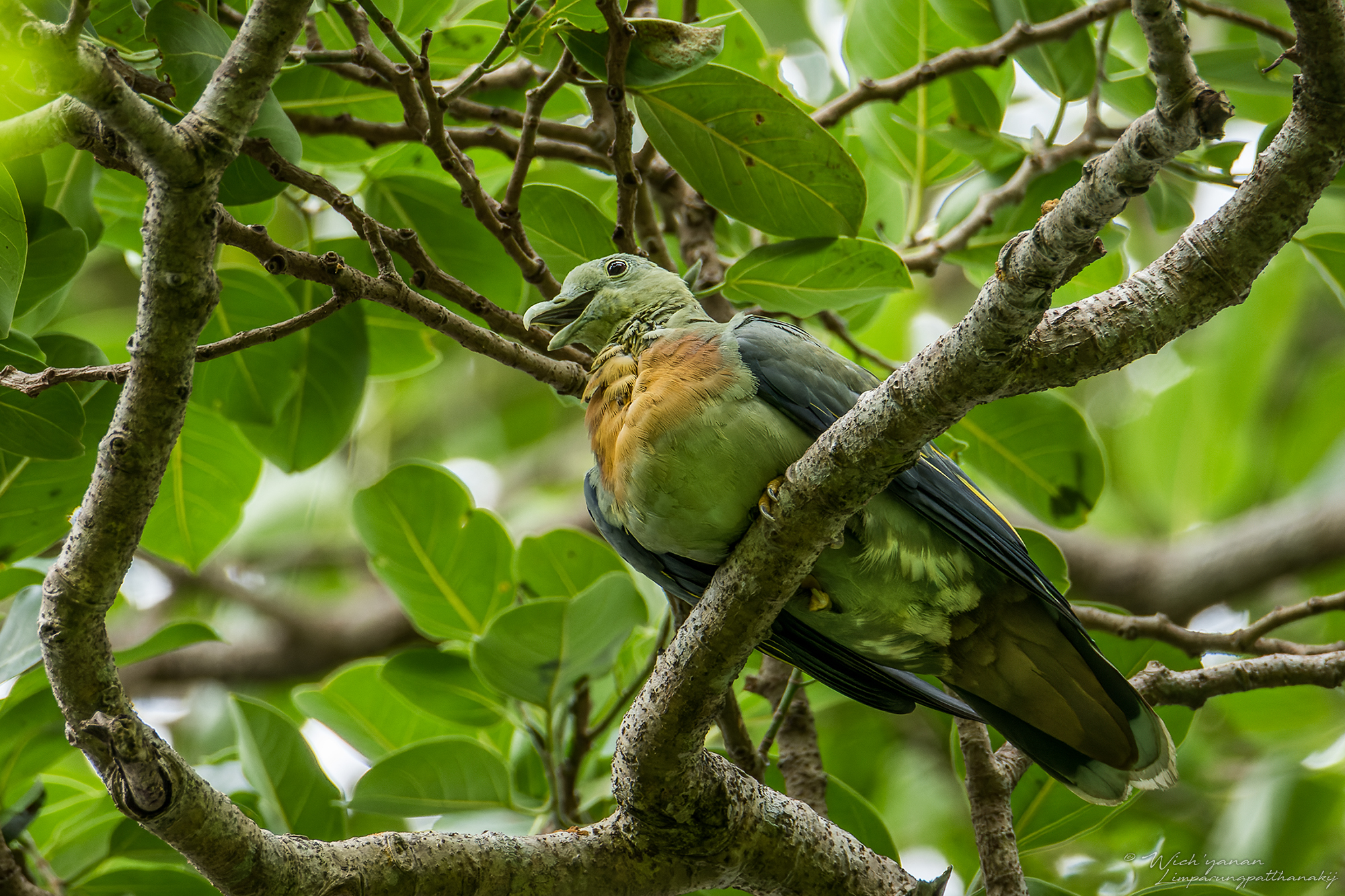

Conservation status
- Vulnerable (IUCN 3.1)

Scientific classification
- Kingdom: Animalia
- Phylum: Chordata
- Class: Aves
- Order: Columbiformes
- Family: Columbidae
- Genus: Treron
- Species: T. capellei

Binomial name
- Treron capellei (Temminck, 1822)

= Large green pigeon =

Species of bird

The large green pigeon (Treron capellei) is a species of bird in the family Columbidae. It is found in Brunei, Indonesia, Malaysia, Myanmar, and Thailand. Its natural habitat is subtropical or tropical moist lowland forests. It is threatened by habitat loss.

== Population ==
The population of the large green pigeon is estimated to be at approximately 15,000 to 30,000 individuals across its range in Southeast Asia.

== Ecology ==
This bird inhabits primary and secondary evergreen rainforests, almost always in the lowland but may inhabit foothills of up to 1,500 metres (4,900 ft) high. Small flocks generate in the high canopies of the rainforest in search of fruiting trees. Although this bird is primarily active during the day, nocturnal movements have been noticed.

== Threats ==
The largest threat to the large green pigeon is the deforestation of its forest home. Large amounts of its original habitat have been cut down due to illegal logging and making way for palm oil plantations which have also had a devastating effect on other species.
