= Mega Rice Project =

Abandoned agricultural project in Indonesian Borneo

Coordinates: 2.5°S 114.35°E

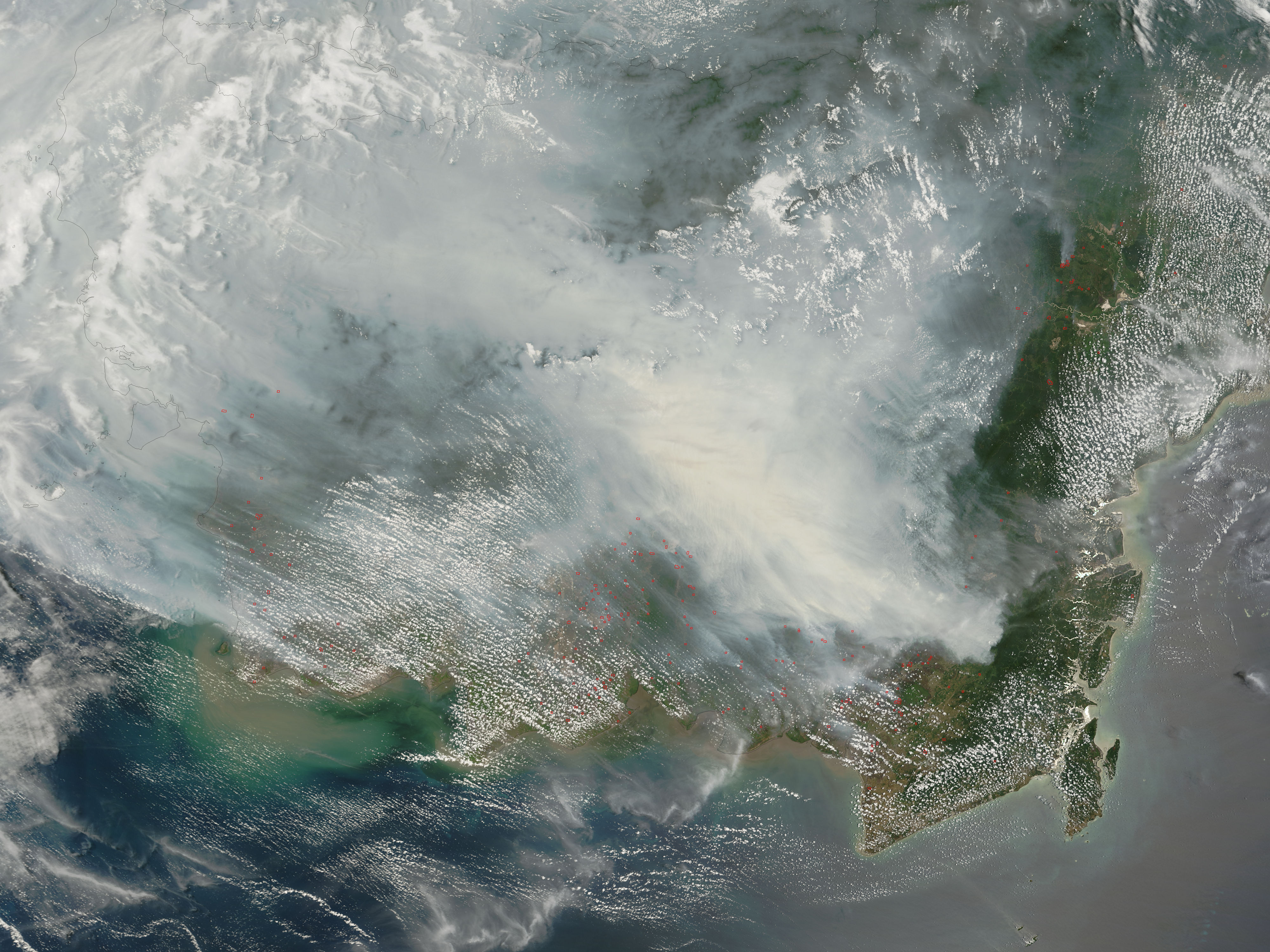
Fires on Borneo in 2006. Fires in peat—thick layers of dead, but un-decayed vegetation—are extremely smoky and difficult to put out.

The Mega Rice Project was initiated in 1996 in the southern sections of Kalimantan, the Indonesian section of Borneo. The goal was to turn one million hectares of unproductive and sparsely populated peat swamp forest into rice paddies in an effort to alleviate Indonesia's growing food shortage. The government made a large investment in constructing irrigation canals and removing trees. The project did not succeed, and was eventually abandoned after causing considerable damage to the environment.

== Overview ==
The peat swamp forest in the south of Kalimantan is an unusual ecoregion that is home to many unique or rare species such as orangutans, as well as to slow-growing but valuable trees. The peat swamp forest is a dual ecosystem, with diverse tropical trees standing on a 10m - 12m layer of peat - partly decayed and waterlogged plant material - which in turn covers relatively infertile soil. Peat is a major store of carbon. If broken down and burned it contributes to CO_{2} emissions, a source of global warming. Unlike northern forests, which regenerate in 10–30 years even after clear-cut felling, the peat swamp forest may take several centuries to regenerate.

The peat swamp forests of Kalimantan were being slowly cleared for small scale farming and plantations before 1997, but most of the original cover remained. In 1996 the Indonesian government initiated the Mega Rice Project (MRP), which aimed to convert one million hectares of peat swamp forest to rice paddies. Between 1996 and 1998, more than 4,000 km of drainage and irrigation channels were dug, and deforestation started in part through legal forestry and in part through burning. The water channels, and the roads and railways built for legal forestry, opened up the region to illegal forestry. In the MRP area, forest cover dropped from 64.8% in 1991 to 45.7% in 2000, and clearance has continued since then. It appears that almost all the marketable trees have now been removed from the areas covered by the MRP.

Where the forests had often flooded up to 2m deep in the rainy season, now their surface is dry at all times of the year. The government has therefore abandoned the MRP, but the drying peat is vulnerable to fires which continue to break out on a massive scale.

Peat forest destruction is causing sulphuric acid pollution of the rivers. In the rainy seasons, the canals are discharging acidic water with a high ratio of pyritic sulphate into rivers up to 150 km upstream from the river mouth. This may be a factor contributing to lower fish catches.

== See also ==
- Rice production in Indonesia
- Deforestation in Borneo
- Borneo peat swamp forests – Ecoregion in Borneo
