= AOP =

AOP may refer to:

== Organisations ==
- Aama Odisha Party, political party, India
- Association of Optometrists, a British trade association
- American Opera Projects
- Assembly of the Poor, an NGO network in Thailand
- Association of Photographers, a British trade association
- Australian Orangutan Project
- Army of the Potomac, the major Union Army in the Eastern Theater of the American Civil War.

== Science, mathematics and technology ==
- An abbreviation of prebediolone acetate (21-acetoxypregnenolone)
- Advanced oxidation process
- Adverse outcome pathway, to adverse effects in biology
- All one polynomial
- Annals of Probability, a mathematics journal
- Apnea of prematurity
- Argument of periapsis, an orbital element of an object in a star's orbit (for sun orbit, 'Argument of perihelion')
- AOP (IRC), AutoOp, an Internet Relay chat access level

=== Computer programming ===
- Agent-oriented programming
- Aspect-oriented programming
- Attribute-oriented programming

== Food ==
- Appellation d'origine protégée, the French term for protected designation of origin, a quality label of the European Union
- Appellation d'origine protégée (Switzerland), a food certification of Switzerland

== Other ==
- aop, advance online publication
- AŌP, a Japanese idol group
- Age of Persuasion, a Canadian radio programme
- Authors of Pain, a professional wrestling tag team
- Air observation post, artillery spotter aircraft
- Apocalypse of Peter, a New Testament apocryphal text
- Annual operations plan, part of sales and operations planning

== See also ==
- AOPS (disambiguation)
