= Leif Cocks =

Australian zoologist, primatologist and conservationist (born 1964)

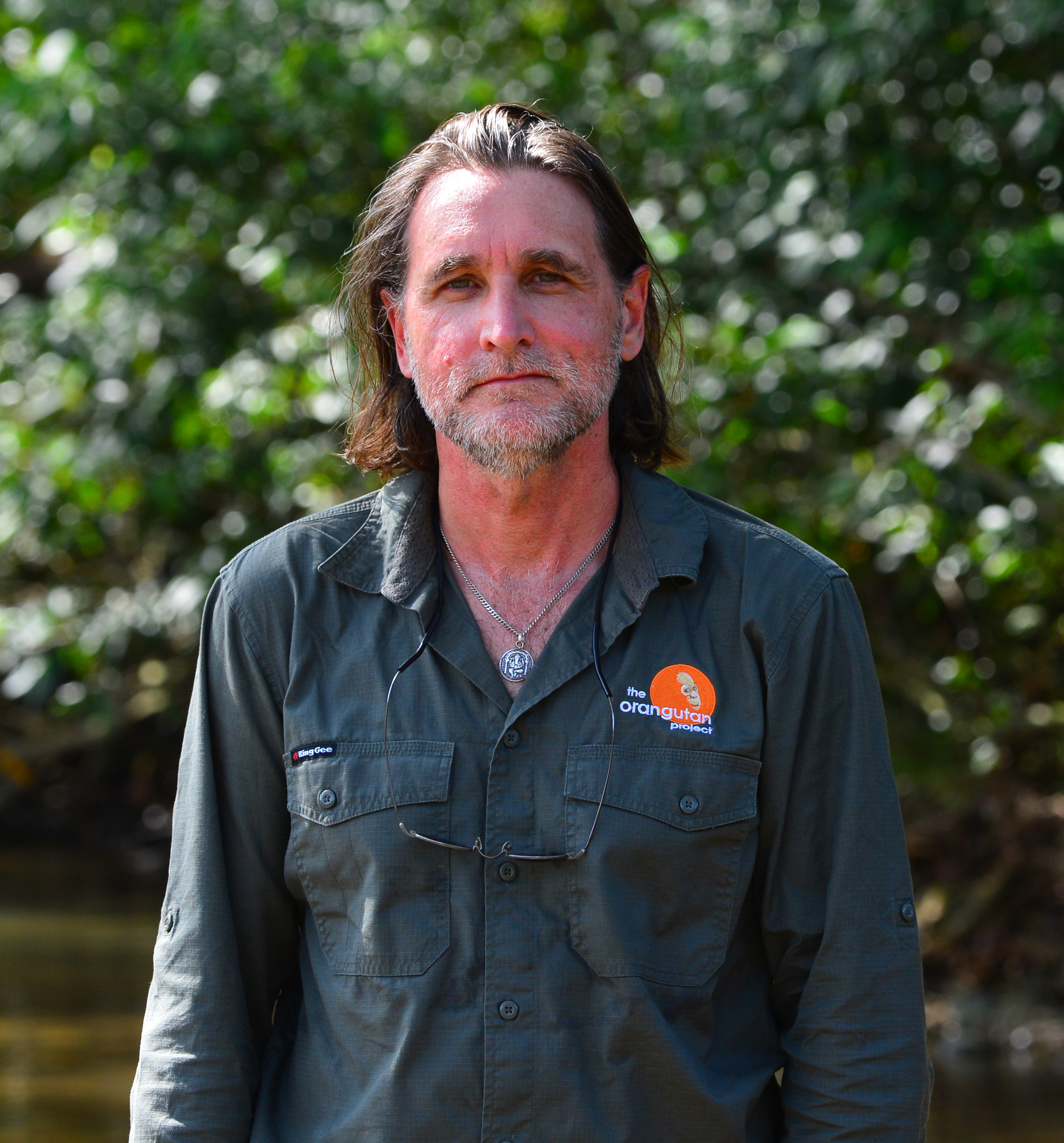
- Leif Cocks in 2022
- Born: Leif Cocks; 1964 (age 61–62); Sydney, Australia
- Education: Curtin University
- Occupations: Zoologist; Primatologist; Conservationist
- Years active: 1986–present
- Employer: Perth Zoo (1986–2006)
- Known for: Founder of The Orangutan Project
- Notable work: Orangutans: My Cousins, My Friends
- Awards: John Curtin Medal (2019); Pongo Environmental Award (2019); Medal of the Order of Australia (2020)
- Website: leifcocks.org

Leif Cocks (born 1964) is an Australian zoologist, primatologist, and conservationist. He is the founder of The Orangutan Project, an international non-profit organisation established in 1998 to support the conservation and welfare of orangutans in Southeast Asia.

== Early life and education ==
Leif Cocks was born in 1964 in Sydney, Australia, and spent much of his childhood in Hong Kong. He completed a Bachelor of Applied Science in Biology, specialising in zoology, at Curtin University (then the Western Australian Institute of Technology) in 1985. He later undertook postgraduate studies, including completing a Master of Science with research focused on the health and behavioural welfare of captive orangutans.

== Career ==
Cocks began working at Perth Zoo in 1986, initially in the Bird Section. In 1988, he joined the Primate Section, where he became Head Orangutan Keeper. During his tenure, he contributed to Perth Zoo’s orangutan breeding program and introduced behavioural enrichment protocols aimed at improving the psychological welfare of captive great apes. Cocks later held several positions, including Supervisor of Primates and Curator of Exotics. In 2006, Cocks oversaw the first-ever successful reintroduction of a zoo-born orangutan, Temara, into Bukit Tigapuluh National Park in Sumatra.

In 1998, while employed at the zoo, Cocks founded The Orangutan Project (TOP) to support conservation efforts in Borneo and Sumatra. Initially a volunteer-based charity, the organisation grew into an international NGO funding conservation projects in Borneo and Sumatra. It funds habitat protection, orphan care, rehabilitation, and community education programs.

Cocks also founded the International Elephant Project, International Tiger Project and Forests for People to protect elephants, tigers and forest communities. He also established Wildlife Asia, a regional conservation alliance, and helped establish advisory positions with organisations such as the Center for Orangutan Protection and is the Vice President of Orang Utan Republik Foundation.

Cocks has been an advocate for the concept of non-human personhood for great apes and has argued that they should be granted basic rights due to their high intelligence. In 2015, Cocks testified in an Argentinian court case involving an orangutan named Sandra. His testimony supported the legal argument to treat Sandra as a non-human person with rights. The court subsequently granted Sandra rights to life, liberty, and protection from harm, setting a legal precedent. He is also an outspoken critic of industries contributing to deforestation, particularly the palm oil industry.

As an author, Cocks has published three books: Orangutans and their Battle for Survival (2002), the best-selling Orangutans: My Cousins, My Friends (2016), and Finding Our Humanity (2018).

== Personal life ==
Cocks is a vegan. He is noted for his close rapport with orangutans, and is often referred as an "orangutan whisperer." Cocks has described his relationships with these apes as based on deep, enduring trust and cites their ability to remember him after long periods as evidence of their personhood.

== Books ==
- Cocks, Leif (2003). Orangutans and their Battle for Survival. Uwa Pub. ISBN 1876268808.
- Cocks, Leif (2016). Orangutans: My Cousins, My Friends. The Orangutan Project. ISBN 0995408017.
- Cocks, Leif (2018). Finding Our Humanity. Wildlife Conservation International. ISBN 0648501809.

== Awards and recognition ==
Cocks has received multiple honors for his conservation work. In 2019, he received the John Curtin Medal from Curtin University. That same year, the Orang Utan Republik Foundation awarded him with a Pongo Environmental Award for his contributions to orangutan conservation.

In the 2020 Australia Day Honours, he was awarded the Medal of the Order of Australia (OAM) for his service to the conservation of endangered animals.
