= Lady Jane =

Lady Jane may refer to:

== Media ==
- Lady Jane (1986 film), a British film directed by Trevor Nunn
- Lady Jane (2008 film), a French film directed by Robert Guédiguian
- "Lady Jane" (song), a 1966 song by the Rolling Stones
- "Lady Jane", a song on the 1994 Promised Land (Queensrÿche album)
- "Lady Jane", a song on the 2009 EP Songs for Sorrow by British singer Mika

== People ==
- Lady Jane (singer) (born 1984), South Korean singer and television personality
- Lady Jane Birdwood (1913–2000), British political activist
- Lady Jane Campbell (born 1959), British campaigner for disability reforms
- Lady Jane Cheyne (1621–1669), English poet and playwright
- Lady Jane Cornwallis (1581–1659), English lady whose letters were published in 1842
- Lady Jane Dawnay (born 1953), British aristocrat
- Lady Jane Digby (1807–1881), English aristocrat
- Lady Jane Douglas (1698–1753), Scottish noblewoman
- Lady Jane Fellowes (born 1957), sister of Diana, Princess of Wales
- Lady Jane Franklin (1791–1875), English wife of explorer Sir John Franklin
- Lady Jane Grey (1537–1554), monarch of England for nine days in 1553
- Lady Jane Hamilton (before 1704–1753), British noblewoman
- Lady Jane Lacey (born 1932), British aristocrat
- Lady Jane Lumley (1537–1578), English noble and scholar
- Lady Jane Melville (1753–1829), daughter of David Leslie, 6th Earl of Leven, Scottish peer
- Lady Jane Ruthven (died 1668), Scottish lady-in-waiting for Queen Christina of Sweden
- Lady Jane Seymour (c.1541–1561), influential English writer
- Lady Jane Wellesley (born 1951), British television producer and writer
- Lady Jane Whorwood (1612–1684), Royalist agent during the English Civil War

=== Fictional ===
- Lady Jane, a character in Gilbert and Sullivan's 1881 Patience (opera)
- Lady Jane Coningsby, a recurring character in the British Lady Grace Mysteries detective books
- Lady Jane Felsham, a character in the British television series Lovejoy
- Lady Jane Greystoke, a major character in Edgar Rice Burroughs's series of Tarzan novels
- Lady Jane Jacks, a character on the American soap opera General Hospital
- Lady Jane, Mr. Krook's cat, in Dickens' Bleak House

== Other ==
- Lady Jane (boutique), the first women's fashion boutique on London's Carnaby Street
- Jenny (orangutan), also known as Lady Jane

== See also ==
- Lady Jayne: Killer, a 2003 American film
