= Lang Trang =

Cave formation in Vietnam

The Lang Trang is a cave formation located in Northern Vietnam. Palaeontological remains found in the cave date from the Pleistocene epoch.

== Fossil content ==
Mammals from the Lang Trang Cave
Genus	Species	Material	Notes	Member	Images
Pongo	P. nguyenbinheri		An Orangutan		
Pongo	P. grovesei		An Orangutan		

== See also ==
- List of fossil sites
