= Pongo nguyenbinheri =

Scientific classification
- Kingdom: Animalia
- Phylum: Chordata
- Class: Mammalia
- Order: Primates
- Suborder: Haplorhini
- Family: Hominidae
- Genus: Pongo
- Species: P. nguyenbinheri

Binomial name
- Pongo nguyenbinheri Cameron et al., 2025

Species of fossil ape

Pongo nguyenbinheri is an extinct species of Orangutan from the Pleistocene aged deposits of Làng Tráng and Kéo Lèng caves of Northern Vietnam.
