= Pongo grovesei =

Pongo grovesei Temporal range: Pleistocene

Scientific classification
- Kingdom: Animalia
- Phylum: Chordata
- Class: Mammalia
- Order: Primates
- Suborder: Haplorhini
- Family: Hominidae
- Genus: Pongo
- Species: P. grovesei

Binomial name
- Pongo grovesei Cameron et al., 2025

Extinct species of Orangutan

Pongo grovesei is an extinct species of Orangutan that lived during the Pleistocene epoch being known from the caves of Làng Tráng and Kéo Lèng in Northern Vietnam.
