= AOPS =

Aops is a genus of scorpions.

AOPS or AOPs may also refer to:

- Advanced oxidation processes or AOPs, a set of chemical treatment procedures
- Apparent Optical Properties or AOPs, a term related to ocean optics
- Arctic and Offshore Patrol Ship, of the Royal Canadian Navy
- Art of Problem Solving, a series of books by Richard Rusczyk and Sandor Lehoczky
- Australian Open Pickleball Slam, a tournament held in conjunction with the Australian Tennis Open

== See also ==
- AOP (disambiguation)
