= Adverse outcome pathway =

Biological risk assessment representation

An adverse outcome pathway (AOP) is structured representation of biological events leading to adverse effects and is considered relevant to risk assessment. The AOP links in a linear way existing knowledge along one or more series of causally connected key events (KE) between two points — a molecular initiating event (MIE) and an adverse outcome (AO) that occur at a level of biological organization relevant to risk assessment. The linkage between the events is described by key event relationships (KER) that describe the causal relationships between the key events.

AOPs are important for expanding the use of mechanistic toxicological data for risk assessment and regulatory applications with recent applications in further disciplines such as climate science.

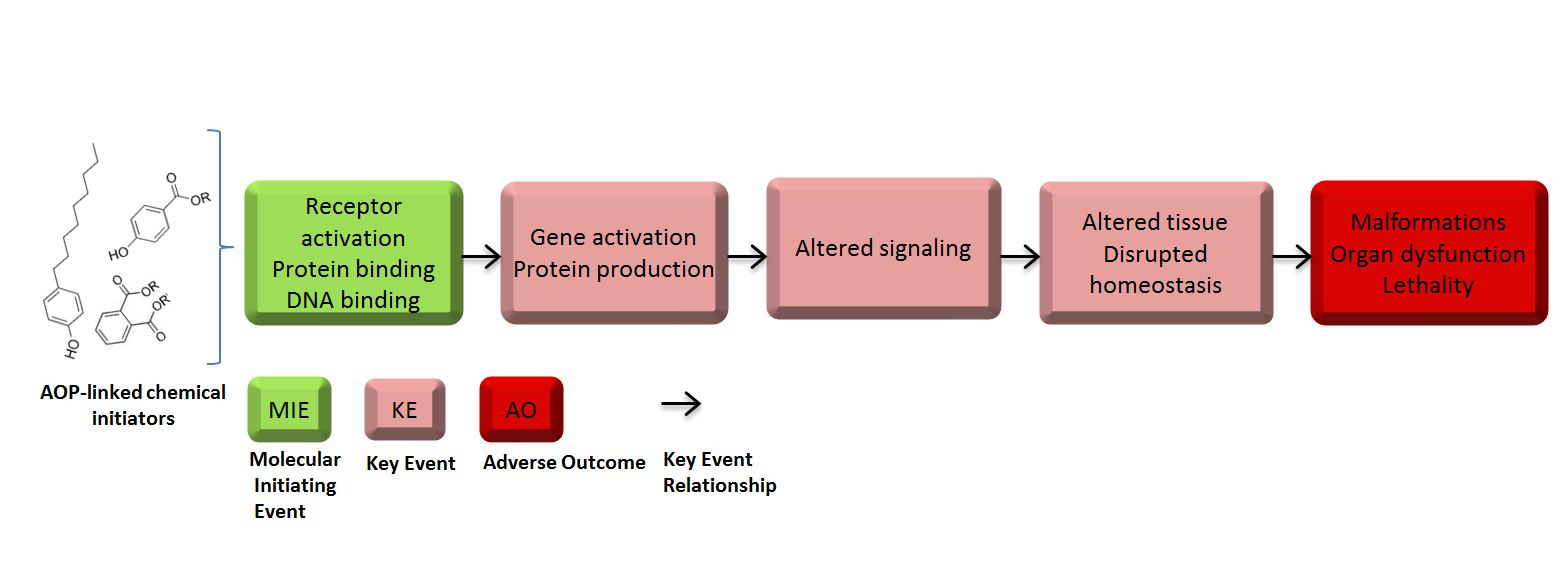
Schematic representation of AOP with hypothetical events

== Background ==
In 2012, the Organisation for Economic Co-operation and Development (OECD) launched a new programme on the development of adverse outcome pathways. A guidance document describes in detail how AOPs are to be developed, reviewed, agreed and published at the OECD level. The AOP development and reviewing workflow is intended to take place via a web-based IT management tool: the Adverse Outcome Pathway Knowledge Base (AOP-KB) which is currently still under development. It is the wiki-based, user-friendly tool providing open-source interface for collaborative sharing of established AOPs and building new AOPs. The AOP-KB gives the scientific community the possibility to enter, share and discuss their AOP-related knowledge at one central point of information. The AOP-KB allows for building AOPs by entering and then linking information about MIEs, KEs, AOs and Chemical Initiators. Knowing that pathway elements are not necessarily unique to a single AOP, value is added to existing knowledge by facilitating the re-use of MIE, KE and AO information in multiple AOPs, which prevents redundancy and make the collective knowledge about those entities available in all AOPs in which they appear.

The AOP-KB is a combination of individually developed applications, synchronised and orchestrated in a way that gives users the possibility to capture, review, browse and comment on AOPs shared by the AOP stakeholder community.

The AOP-KB project is an Organisation for Economic Co-operation and Development initiative, which is executed as close collaboration between the Joint Research Centre of European Commission, the United States Environmental Protection Agency and the Engineer Research and Development Center of United States Army Corps of Engineers for the purpose of the Organisation for Economic Co-operation and Development's programme on the development of AOPs

The AOP has also been recently applied to better understand the effects of climate related stressors, further expanding the potential of AOPs to other scientific disciplines

More recent developments have focused on the analysis of AOP networks and the quantification of KERs with a view to developing mathematical models of AOPs, sometimes referred to as quantitative AOPs.

Scientific workshops held for advancing the concept of AOP:

- 2013
  - January 23–25, Baltimore, USA Building Shared Experience to Advance Practical Application of Pathway-Based Toxicology:Liver Toxicity Mode-of-Action
- 2014
  - March 2–7, Somma Lombardo, Italy Advancing Adverse Outcome Pathways (AOP) for Integrated Toxicology and Regulatory Applications
  - August 24, Prague, Czech Republic AOPs 101: The How and Why of Development and Use
  - September 3–5, Bethesda, USA Adverse Outcome Pathways: From Research to Regulation workshop held by NTP Interagency Center for the Evaluation of Alternative Toxicological Methods (NICEATM) and the Physicians Committee for Responsible Medicine. Materials from the workshop, including links to the plenary session videocasts and summaries of the breakout group discussions, are available on the NTP website
