= The Orangutan Project =

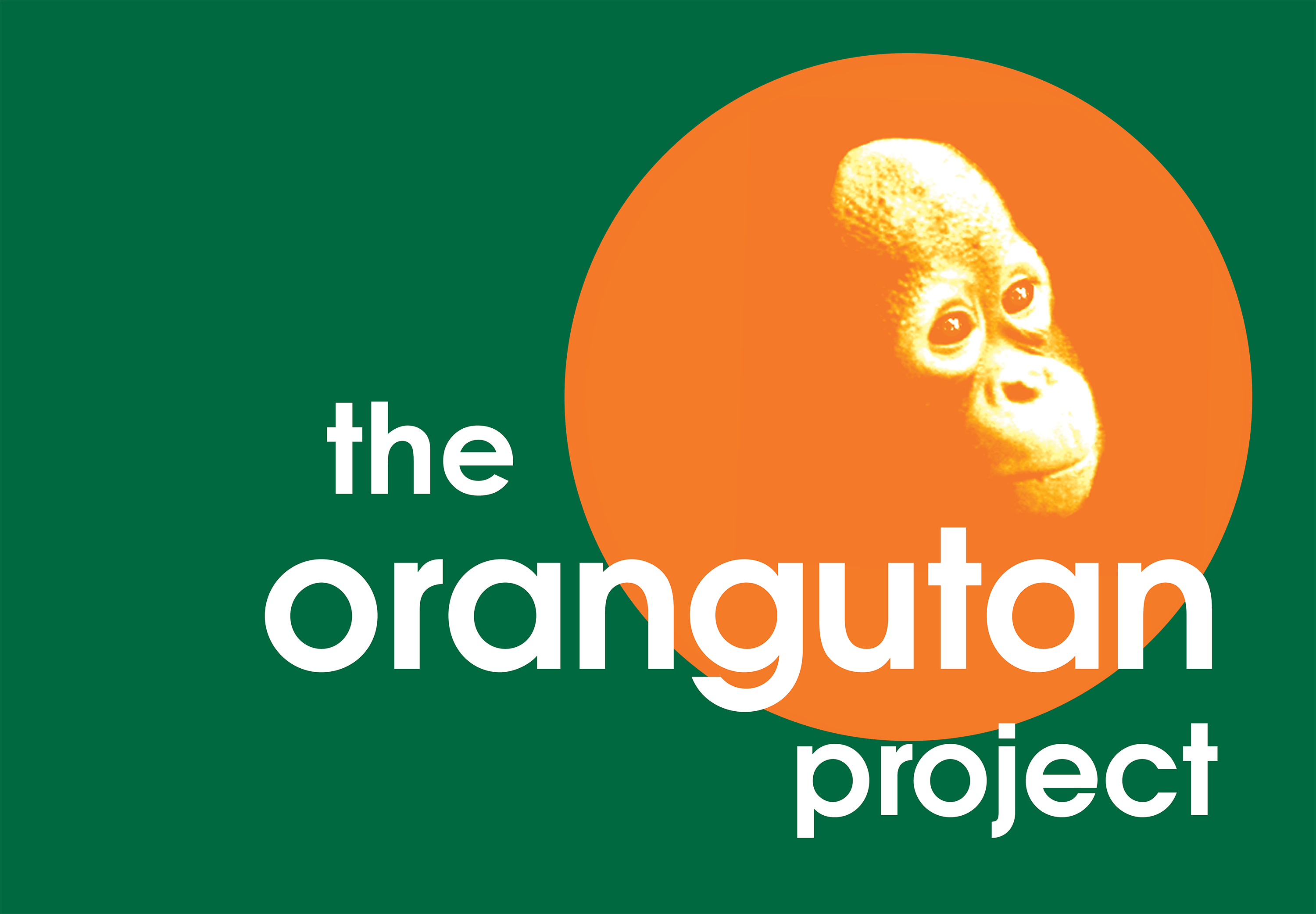
- Nickname: TOP
- Formation: 1998
- Founder: Leif Cocks
- Founded at: Australia
- Type: Nonprofit
- Legal status: Company
- Purpose: Wildlife Conservation
- Headquarters: Perth, Western Australia
- Location: Perth, Western Australia
- Board of directors: Leif Cocks, Kylie Bullo & Troy Kenah
- Key people: Leif Cocks OAM
- Parent organization: Wildlife Conservation International
- Website: www.theorangutanproject.org

The Orangutan Project also known as The Australian Orangutan Project is a non-profit registered Australian environmental organization established in 1998 by Leif Cocks. The organization focuses on the conservation of orangutans and the preservation and rehabilitation of their forest habitats, primarily in Indonesia. It runs its own projects in partnership with local organizations and supports other organizations working in the field. It is a project of Wildlife Conservation International (WCI), a non-profit registered Australian environmental organization with affiliates and chapters in Canada, US, EU and New Zealand.

== Funding ==
The organization receives funding through public donations, community events, membership fees, orphan orangutan 'adoptions', and grants. As of 30 June 2024, providing funding over AUD $5,603,175 (USD $3,667,558) to wildlife conservation. In 2005, WCI received over $62,000 from the Australian Government's Regional Natural Heritage Program (RNHP) to develop and implement orangutan protection units in the Bukit Tigapuluh National Park region in Sumatra and to monitor and deter illegal logging. In 2006, the organization secured an additional $92,000 from the RNHP to extend the protection efforts to include other species such as the Sumatran elephant and tiger. TOP also received A$207,500 for wildlife surveys in Borneo's forests, including the Ulu Segama reserve, to establish wildlife baseline data and develop a Forest Management Plan focusing on orangutan populations. Since its inception, The Orangutan Project has contributed over USD 25 million (≈AUD 37 million) to orangutan conservation projects across Borneo and Sumatra.

== Leadership ==
The Orangutan Project was founded by Leif Cocks, who also serves as the organization's current CEO. Leif has been involved in orangutan conservation for over 30 years and has contributed to various projects related to the protection of orangutans and their habitats. He holds a Master of Science from Curtin University, Western Australia, for research on the welfare of orangutans and in 2020, was awarded the Medal of the Order of Australia for his outstanding contributions to orangutan conservation."Founder of The Orangutan Project receives major Australian honor". PR Newswire. 21 February 2020. . Leif has published several papers in peer review journals and books on the subject, including "Orangutans and their Battle for Survival" and an autobiography titled "Orangutans, My Cousins, My Friends, and 'Finding Our Humanity'".

== Organizational structure ==
The Orangutan Project operates as a conservation organization supporting projects across Indonesia and Malaysia. It addresses issues facing fragmented orangutan populations, including rescue, rehabilitation, and release programs, as well as forest habitat protection, regeneration, education, research, and local community partnerships. In 2017, the organization transitioned structurally, leading to the establishment of Wildlife Conservation International Limited, which oversees The Orangutan Project and its related projects, including the International Elephant Project, Forests for People and the International Tiger Project.

== Partnerships ==
The Orangutan Project collaborates with several regional alliances and organizations focused on orangutan conservation, such as the Sumatran Rescue Alliance and the Borneo Orangutan Rescue Alliance. Its partners include the Centre for Orangutan Protection, Borneo Nature Foundation, Frankfurt Zoological Society, Orangutan Foundation UK, Orangutan Information Centre, and Orang Utan Republik Foundation.
