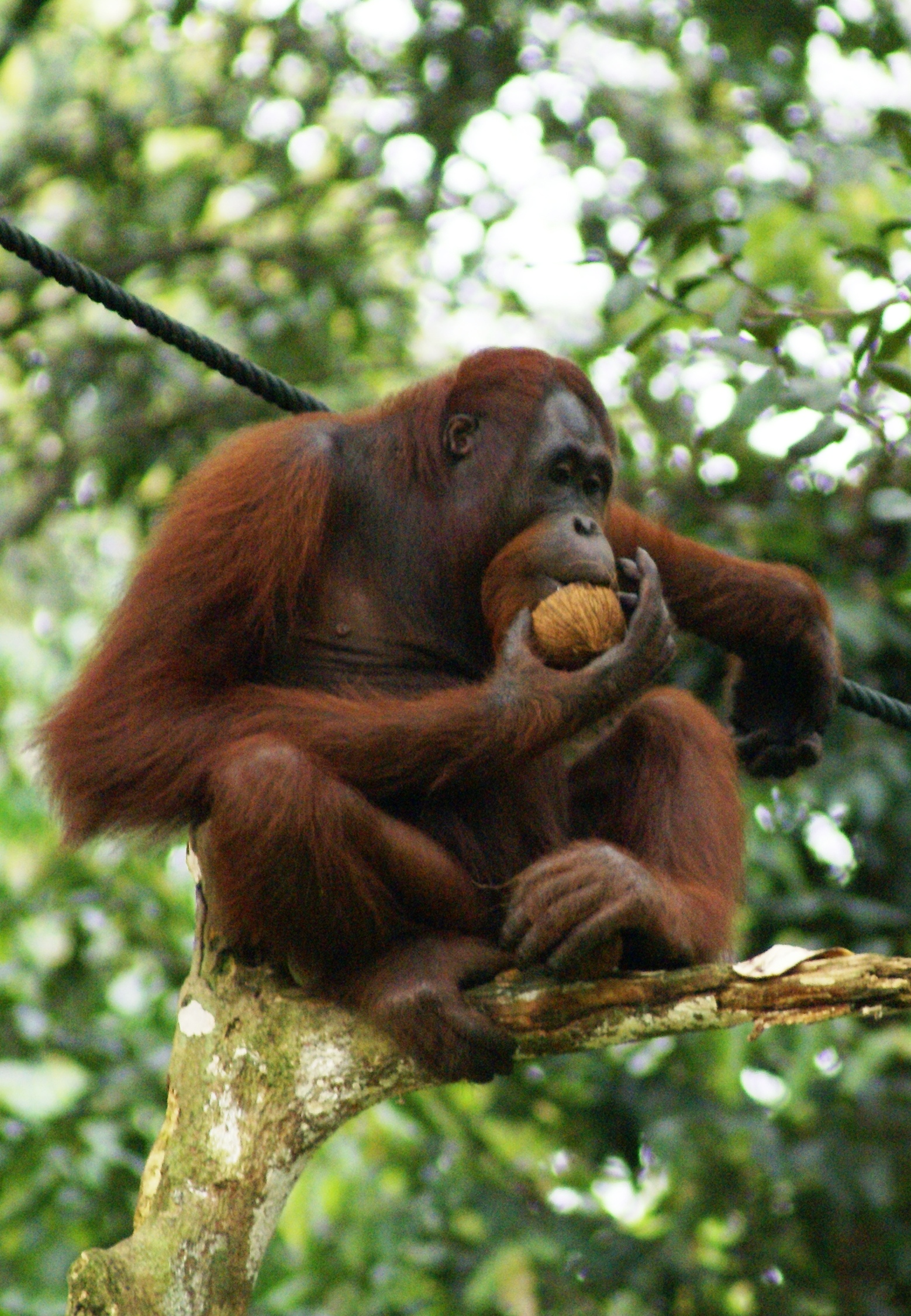
- Bornean orangutan (Pongo pygmaeus)

Scientific classification
- Kingdom: Animalia
- Phylum: Chordata
- Class: Mammalia
- Order: Primates
- Superfamily: Hominoidea
- Family: Hominidae
- Subfamily: Ponginae
- Genus: Pongo; Lacépède, 1799

Type species
- Pongo borneo Lacépède, 1799 (= Simia pygmaeus Linnaeus, 1760)

Species
- Pongo pygmaeus Pongo abelii Pongo tapanuliensis †Pongo hooijeri †Pongo weidenreichi †Pongo grovesei †Pongo nguyenbinheri
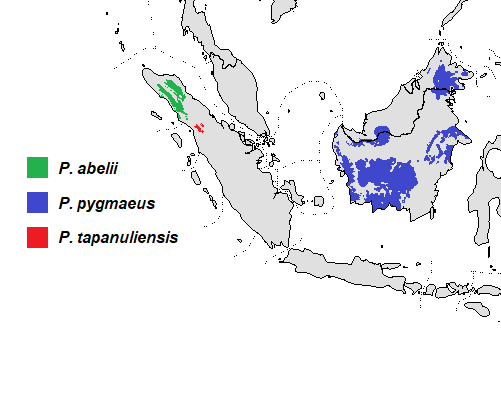
- Range of the three extant species

Synonyms
- Faunus Oken, 1816; Lophotus Fischer, 1813; Macrobates Billberg, 1828; Satyrus Lesson, 1840

= Orangutan =

Orangutans Temporal range: Early Pleistocene – Recent

Genus of Asian apes

Orangutans are great apes native to the rainforests of Indonesia and Malaysia. They are now found only in parts of Borneo and Sumatra, but during the Pleistocene they ranged throughout Southeast Asia and South China. Classified in the genus Pongo, orangutans were originally considered to be one species. In 1996, they were divided into two species: the Bornean orangutan (P. pygmaeus, with three subspecies) and the Sumatran orangutan (P. abelii); a third species, the Tapanuli orangutan (P. tapanuliensis), was identified definitively in 2017. The orangutans are the only surviving members of the subfamily Ponginae, which diverged genetically from the other hominids (gorillas, chimpanzees, and humans) between 19.3 and 15.7 million years ago.

The most arboreal of the great apes, orangutans spend most of their time in trees. They have proportionally long arms and short legs, and have reddish-brown hair covering their bodies. Dominant adult males develop distinctive cheek pads or flanges and make long calls that attract females and intimidate rivals; younger subordinate males do not and more resemble adult females. Orangutans are the most solitary of the great apes: social bonds occur primarily between mothers and their dependent offspring. Fruit is the most important component of an orangutan's diet, but they will also eat vegetation, bark, honey, insects and bird eggs. They can live over 30 years, both in the wild and in captivity.

Orangutans are among the most intelligent primates. They use a variety of sophisticated tools and construct elaborate sleeping nests each night from branches and foliage. The apes' learning abilities have been studied extensively. There may be distinctive cultures within populations. Orangutans have been featured in literature and art since at least the 18th century, particularly in works that comment on human society. Field studies of the apes were pioneered by primatologist Biruté Galdikas and they have been kept in captive facilities around the world since at least the early 19th century.

All three orangutan species are considered critically endangered. Human activities have caused severe declines in populations and ranges. Threats to wild orangutan populations include poaching (for bushmeat and retaliation for consuming crops), habitat destruction and deforestation (for palm oil cultivation, and logging), and the illegal pet trade. Several conservation and rehabilitation organisations are dedicated to the survival of orangutans in the wild.

== Etymology ==
Most Western sources attribute the name "orangutan" (also written orang-utan, orang utan, orangutang, and ourang-outang) to the Malay words orang, meaning 'person', and hutan, meaning 'forest'. The Malay used the term to indicate forest-dwelling humans; the first recorded Malay use of "orang-utan" referring to the ape identifies it as a Western term. There is, however, some evidence to suggest that the term may have been used in regard to apes in premodern Old Malay.

In Western sources, the first printed attestation of the word for the apes is in Dutch physician Jacobus Bontius's 1631 Historiae naturalis et medicae Indiae orientalis. He reported that Malays claimed that the ape could talk but preferred not to "lest he be compelled to labour". The word appeared in several German-language descriptions of Indonesian zoology in the 17th century. It has been argued that the word comes specifically from the Banjarese variety of Malay, but the age of the Old Javanese sources mentioned above makes Old Malay a more likely origin for the term. Cribb and colleagues (2014) suggest that Bontius's account referred not to apes (as this description was from Java where the apes were not known to be from) but to humans suffering some serious medical condition (most likely cretinism) and that his use of the word was misunderstood by Nicolaes Tulp, who was the first to use the term in a publication a decade later.

The word was first attested in English in 1693 by physician John Bulwer in the form Orang-Outang, and variants ending with -ng are found in many languages. This spelling (and pronunciation) has remained in use in English up to the present but has come to be regarded as incorrect. The loss of "h" in hutan and the shift from -ng to -n has been taken to suggest the term entered English through Portuguese. In Malay, the term was first attested in 1840, not as an indigenous name but referring to how the English called the animal. The word 'orangutan' in modern Malay and Indonesian was borrowed from English or Dutch in the 20th century—explaining the missing initial 'h' of 'hutan'.

The name of the genus, Pongo, comes from a 16th-century account by Andrew Battel, an English sailor held prisoner by the Portuguese in Angola, which describes two anthropoid "monsters" named Pongo and Engeco. He is now believed to have been describing gorillas, but in the 18th century, the terms orangutan and pongo were used for all great apes. French naturalist Bernard Germain de Lacépède used the term Pongo for the genus in 1799. Battel's "Pongo", in turn, is from the Kongo word mpongi or other cognates from the region: Lumbu pungu, Vili mpungu, or Yombi yimpungu.

== Taxonomy and phylogeny ==
The orangutan was first described scientifically in 1758 in the Systema Naturae of Carl Linnaeus as Homo troglodytes. It was renamed Simia pygmaeus in 1760 by his student Christian Emmanuel Hopp and given the name Pongo by Lacépède in 1799. The populations on the two islands were suggested to be separate species when P. abelii was described by French naturalist René Lesson in 1827. In 2001, P. abelii was confirmed as a full species based on molecular evidence published in 1996, and three distinct populations on Borneo were elevated to subspecies (P. p. pygmaeus, P. p. morio and P. p. wurmbii). A third species, P. tapanuliensis, was described from south of Sumatra's Lake Toba in 2017, and was surprisingly found to be more closely related to the Bornean species, P. pygmaeus than to its fellow Sumatran species, P. abelii.

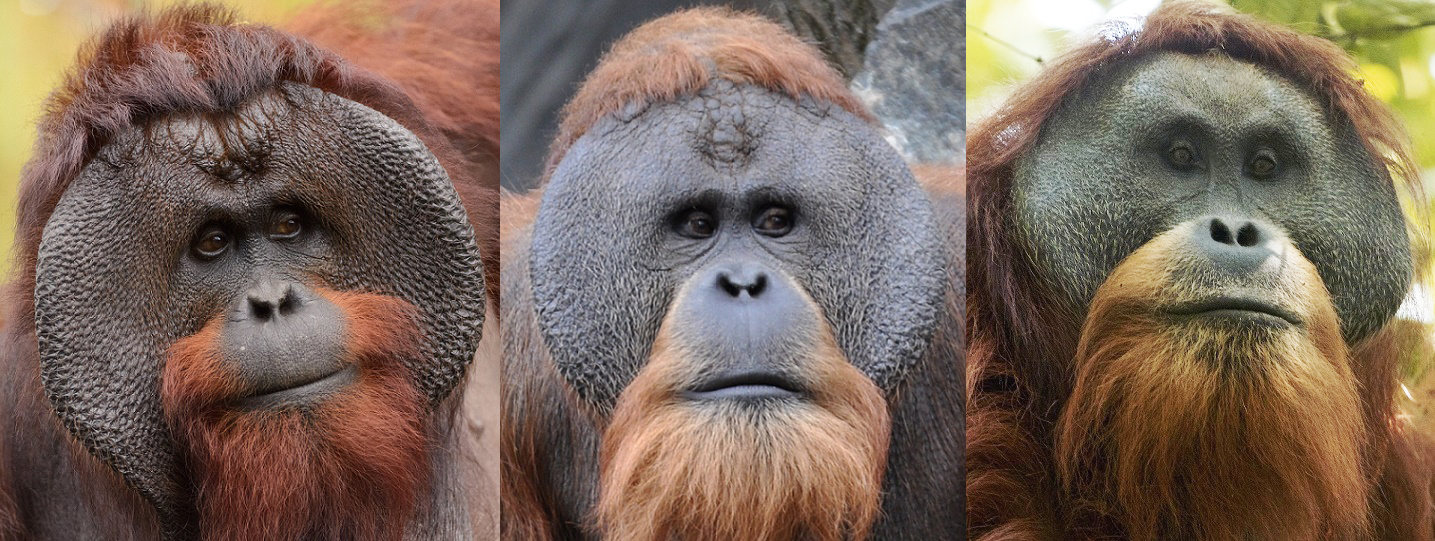
Flanged male Bornean, Sumatran and Tapanuli orangutans

The Sumatran orangutan genome was sequenced in January 2011. Following humans and chimpanzees, the Sumatran orangutan became the third species of great ape whose genome was sequenced. Subsequently, the Bornean species's genome was sequenced. Bornean orangutans (P. pygmaeus) exhibit less genetic diversity than Sumatran orangutans (P. abelii), despite the former's population being six to seven times greater. The researchers hope these genetic data may help conservationists preserve the endangered ape, as well as learn more about human genetic diseases. Similarly to gorillas and chimpanzees, orangutans have 48 diploid chromosomes, in contrast to humans, which have 46.

According to molecular evidence, within apes (superfamily Hominoidea), the gibbons diverged during the early Miocene between 24.1 and 19.7 million years ago (mya), and the orangutans diverged from the African great ape lineage between 19.3 and 15.7 mya. Israfil and colleagues (2011) estimated based on mitochondrial, Y-linked, and X-linked loci that the Sumatran and Bornean species diverged 4.9 to 2.9 mya. By contrast, the 2011 genome study suggested that these two species diverged as recently as circa 400,000 years ago. The study also found that orangutans evolved at a slower pace than both chimpanzees and humans. A 2017 genome study found that the Bornean and Tapanuli orangutans diverged from Sumatran orangutans about 3.4 mya, and from each other around 2.4 mya. Millions of years ago, orangutans travelled from mainland Asia to Sumatra and then Borneo as the islands were connected by land bridges during the recent glacial periods when sea levels were much lower. The present range of Tapanuli orangutans is thought to be close to where ancestral orangutans first entered what is now Indonesia from mainland Asia.

Taxonomy of genus Pongo
Genus Pongo
- Bornean orangutan (Pongo pygmaeus)
  - Pongo pygmaeus pygmaeus – northwest populations
  - Pongo pygmaeus morio – east populations
  - Pongo pygmaeus wurmbii – southwest populations
- Sumatran orangutan (Pongo abelii – Sumatra northwest of Lake Toba)
- Tapanuli orangutan (Pongo tapanuliensis – Sumatra south of Lake Toba)
Phylogeny of superfamily Hominoidea

- Hominoidea
  - gibbons (family Hylobatidae)
  - - orangutans (genus Pongo)
    - - gorillas (genus Gorilla)
      - - chimpanzees and bonobos (genus Pan)
        - humans (genus Homo)

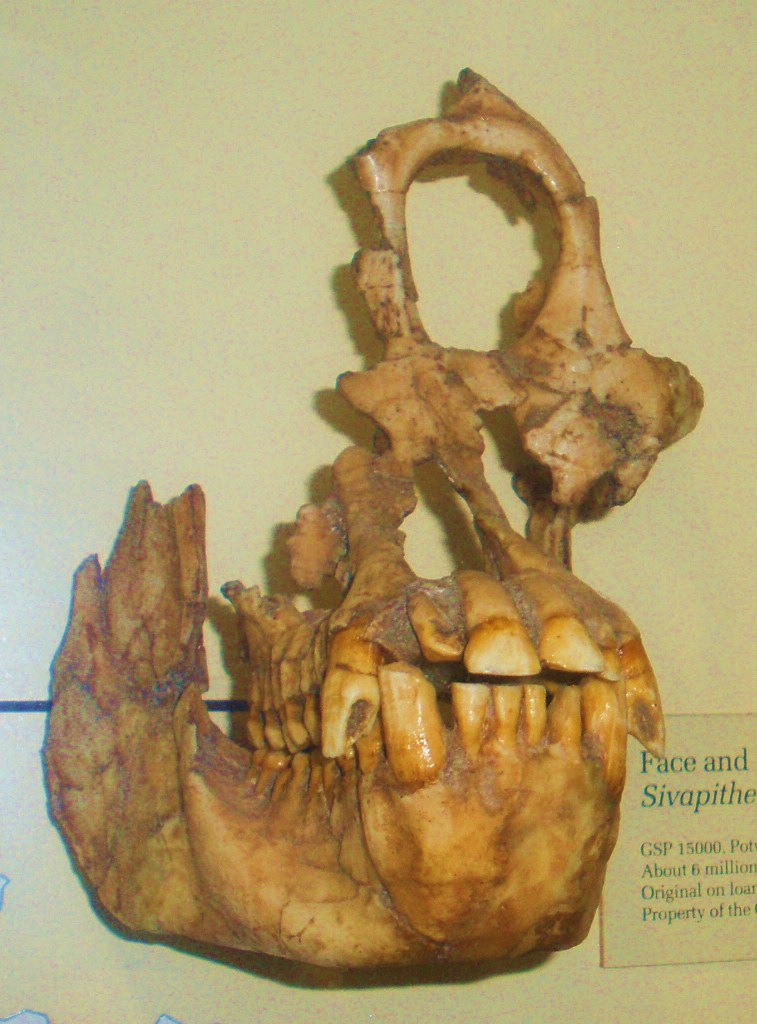
Fossil skull of Sivapithecus sivalensis, an extinct relative of orangutan

=== Fossil record ===
The three orangutan species are the only extant members of the subfamily Ponginae. This subfamily also includes extinct apes such as Lufengpithecus, which occurred 8–2 mya in southern China and Thailand; Indopithecus, which lived in India from 9.2 to 8.6 mya; and Sivapithecus, which lived in India and Pakistan from 12.5 mya until 8.5 mya. These animals likely lived in drier and cooler environments than orangutans do today. Khoratpithecus piriyai, which lived 5–7 mya in Thailand, is believed to be the closest known relative of the living orangutans and inhabited similar environments. The largest known primate, Gigantopithecus, was also a member of Ponginae and lived in China, from 2 mya to 300,000 years ago.

The oldest known record of Pongo is from the Early Pleistocene of Chongzuo, consisting of teeth ascribed to extinct species P. weidenreichi. Pongo is found as part of the faunal complex in the Pleistocene cave assemblage in Vietnam, alongside Giganopithecus, though it is known only from teeth. Some fossils described under the name P. hooijeri have been found in Vietnam, and multiple fossil subspecies have been described from several parts of southeastern Asia. It is unclear if these belong to P. pygmaeus or P. abelii or, in fact, represent distinct species. In 2025, two other distinct species from Pleistocene deposists in the Làng Tráng and Kéo Lèng caves in Vietnam were described as P. grovesei and P. nguyenbinheri. During the Pleistocene, Pongo had a far more extensive range than at present, extending throughout Sundaland and mainland Southeast Asia and South China. Teeth of orangutans are known from Peninsular Malaysia that date to 60,000 years ago. The youngest remains from South China, which are teeth assigned to P. weidenreichi, date to between 66 and 57,000 years ago. The range of orangutans had contracted significantly by the end of the Pleistocene, most likely because of the reduction of forest habitat during the Last Glacial Maximum. They may have nevertheless survived into the Holocene in Cambodia and Vietnam.

== Characteristics ==
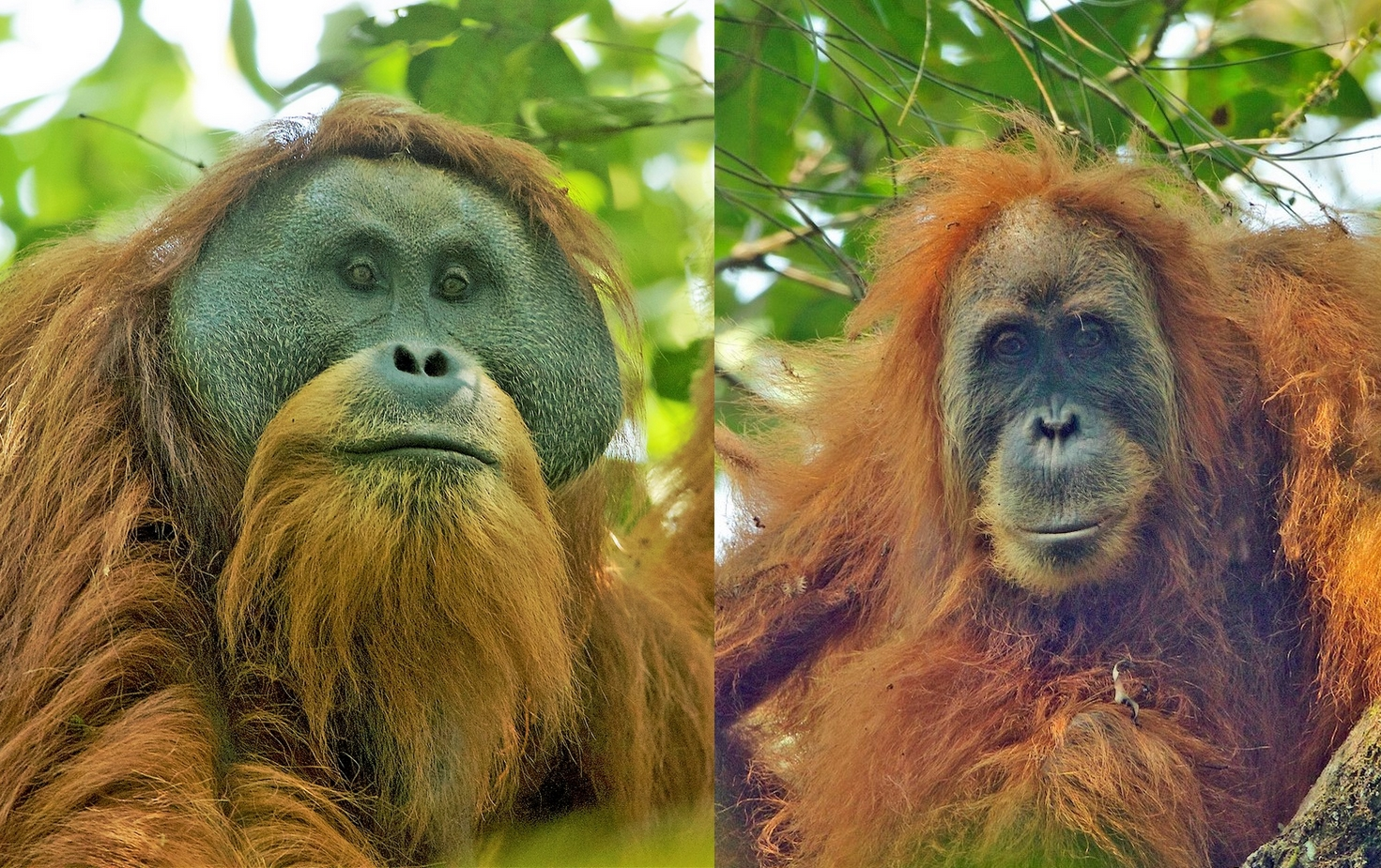
Adult male (left) and female Tapanuli orangutans

Orangutans display significant sexual dimorphism; typically, females stand around 115 cm (45 in) tall and weigh around 37 kg (82 lb), while adult males stand around 137 cm (54 in) tall and weigh 75 kg (165 lb). The tallest orangutan recorded stood at 180 cm (71 in). Compared to humans, they have proportionally long arms, a male orangutan having an arm span of about 2 m (6 ft 7 in), and short legs. They are covered in long reddish hair that starts out bright orange and darkens to maroon or chocolate with age, while the skin is grey-black. Males' faces can develop a beard.

Orangutans have small ears and noses; the ears are unlobed. The mean endocranial volume is 397 cm^{3}. The cranium is elevated relative to the face, which is incurved and prognathous. Compared to other great apes, the brow ridge of an orangutan is underdeveloped. Females and juveniles have relatively circular skulls and thin faces while mature males have a prominent sagittal crest, large cheek pads or flanges, extensive throat pouches and long canines. The cheek pads are made mostly of fatty tissue and are supported by the musculature of the face. The throat pouches act as resonance chambers for making long calls.

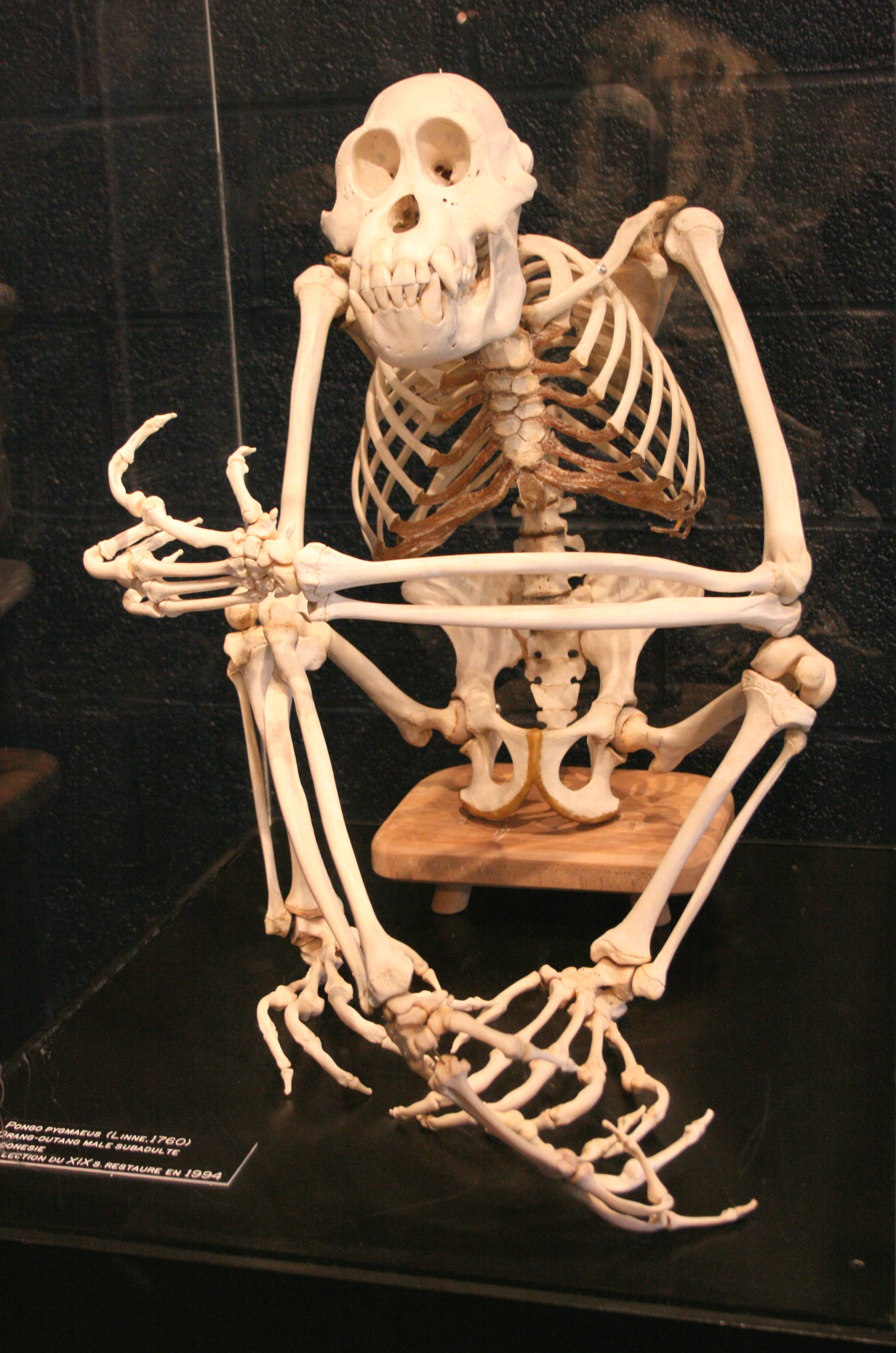
Skeleton of subadult Bornean orangutan

Orangutan hands have four long fingers but a dramatically shorter opposable thumb for a strong grip on branches as they travel high in the trees. The resting configuration of the fingers is curved, creating a suspensory hook grip. With the thumb out of the way, the fingers (and hands) can grip securely around objects with a small diameter by resting the tops of the fingers against the inside of the palm, thus creating a double-locked grip. Their feet have four long toes and an opposable big toe, giving them hand-like dexterity. The hip joints also allow for their legs to rotate similarly to their arms and shoulders.

Orangutans move through the trees by both vertical climbing and suspension. Compared to other great apes, they infrequently descend to the ground where they are more cumbersome. Unlike African apes, orangutans are not true knuckle-walkers, instead bending their digits and walking on the sides of their hands and feet.

Compared to their relatives in Borneo, Sumatran orangutans are more slender with paler and longer hair and a longer face. Tapanuli orangutans resemble Sumatran orangutans more than Bornean orangutans in body build and hair colour. They have shaggier hair, smaller skulls, and flatter faces than the other two species.

== Ecology and behaviour ==
Wild orangutan in the Danum Valley (Sabah, Malaysia, Borneo island)

Orangutans are mainly arboreal and inhabit tropical rainforest, particularly lowland dipterocarp and old secondary forest. Populations are more concentrated near riverside habitats, such as freshwater and peat swamp forest, while drier forests away from the flooded areas have fewer apes. Population density also decreases at higher elevations. Orangutans occasionally enter grasslands, cultivated fields, gardens, young secondary forest, and shallow lakes.

Most of the day is spent feeding, resting, and travelling. They start the day feeding for two to three hours in the morning. They rest during midday, then travel in the late afternoon. When evening arrives, they prepare their nests for the night. Potential predators of orangutans include tigers, clouded leopards and wild dogs. The most common orangutan parasites are nematodes of the genus Strongyloides and the ciliate Balantidium coli. Among Strongyloides, the species S. fuelleborni and S. stercoralis are reported in young individuals. Orangutans also use the plant species Dracaena cantleyi as an anti-inflammatory balm. Captive animals may suffer an upper respiratory tract disease.

=== Diet and feeding ===
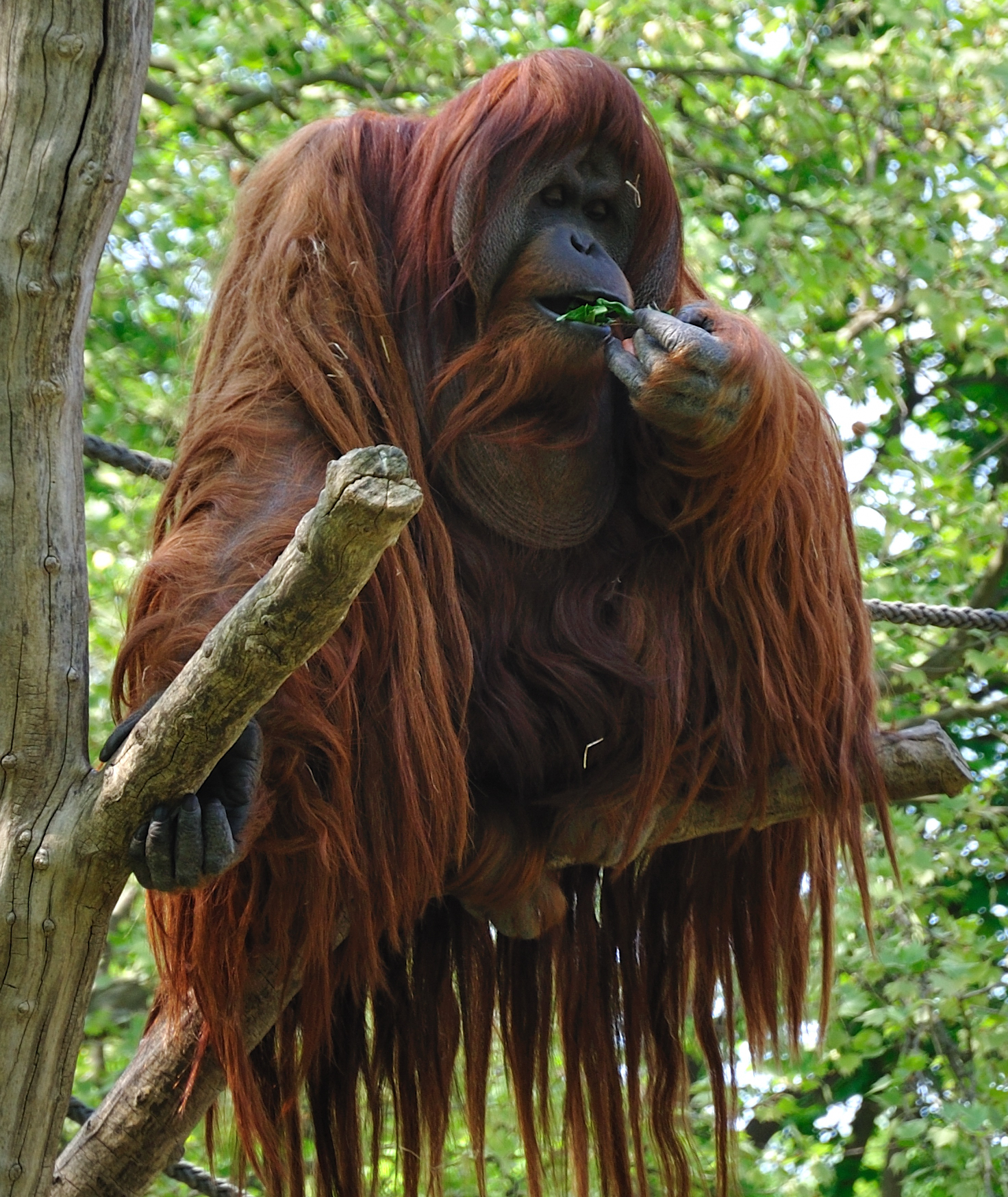
Although orangutans may consume leaves, shoots, and bird eggs, fruit is the most important part of their diet.

Orangutans are primarily fruit-eaters, which can take up 57–80% of their foraging time. Even during times of scarcity, fruit is 16% of their feeding time. Fruits with soft pulp, arils or seed-walls are consumed the most, particularly figs but also drupes and berries. Orangutans are thought to be the sole fruit disperser for some plant species including the vine species Strychnos ignatii which contains the toxic alkaloid strychnine.

Orangutans also include leaves in their diet, which take up 25% of their average foraging time. Leaves are eaten more when fruit is less available, but even during times of fruit abundance, orangutans will eat leaves 11–20% of the time. They appear to depend on the leaf and stem material of Borassodendron borneensis during times of low fruit abundance. Other food items consumed by the apes include bark, honey, bird eggs, insects and small vertebrates including slow lorises.

In some areas, orangutans may practise geophagy, which involves consuming soil and other earth substances. They will uproot soil from the ground as well as eat shelter tubes from tree trunks. Orangutans also visit the sides of cliffs or earth depressions for their mineral licks. Orangutans may eat soils for their anti-toxic kaolin minerals, since their diet contains toxic tannins and phenolic acids.

=== Social life ===
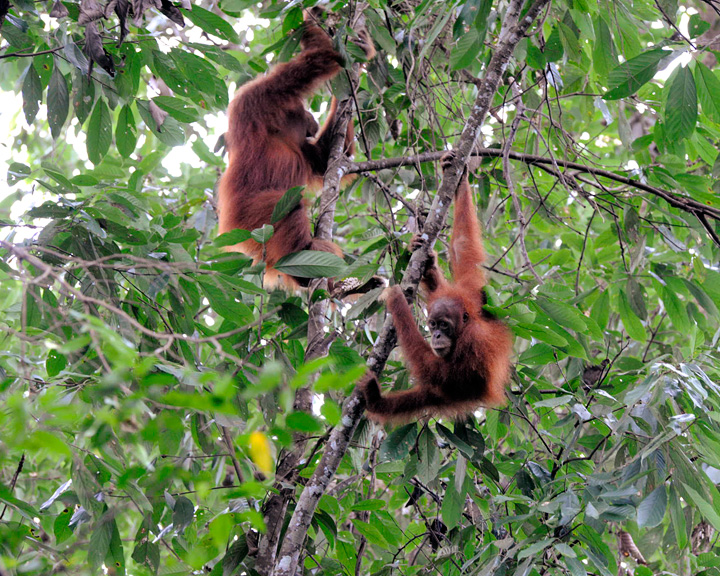
Orangutans are the least social of the great apes.

The social structure of the orangutan can be best described as solitary but social; they live a more solitary lifestyle than the other great apes. Bornean orangutans are generally more solitary than Sumatran orangutans. Orangutan society consists of resident females, along with dependent offspring, living in overlapping home ranges which are encompassed within that of a resident male. Interactions between adult females range from friendly to avoidance to antagonistic. Flanged males are often hostile to both other flanged males and unflanged males, while unflanged males are more peaceful towards each other.

Orangutans disperse and establish their home ranges by age 11. Females tend to live near their birth range, while males disperse farther but may still visit their birth range within their larger home range. They enter a transient phase, which lasts until a male can challenge and remove a dominant, resident male from his home range. Areas where fruit is abundant attract gatherings of orangutans of different social status, who feel no need to compete with one another. These places act as sites for socialisation and mating as well as refuges from harassment. Orangutans will also form travelling groups with members moving between different food sources. which are often pairings between an adult male and a female. Social grooming is uncommon among orangutans.

=== Communication ===
Nest smack
Nest smack, ogg/Vorbis format.

Raspberry
Raspberry ogg/Vorbis format.

Throatscrape
Throatscrape ogg/Vorbis format.

Orangutans communicate with various vocals and sounds. Males will make long calls, both to attract females and to advertise themselves to other males. These calls have three components; they begin with grumbles, peak with pulses and end with bubbles. Both sexes will try to intimidate conspecifics with a series of low frequency noises known collectively as the "rolling call". When uncomfortable, an orangutan will produce a "kiss squeak", which involves sucking in air through pursed lips. Mothers produce throatscrapes to keep in contact with their offspring. Infants make soft hoots when distressed. When building a nest, orangutans will produce smacks or blow raspberries. Orangutan calls display consonant- and vowel-like components and they maintain their meaning over great distances. They also display patterns within patterns via three layers of rhythmic sounds.

Mother orangutans and offspring also use several different gestures and expressions such as beckoning, stomping, lower lip pushing, object shaking and "presenting" a body part. These communicate goals such as "acquire object", "climb on me", "climb on you", "climb over", "move away", "play change: decrease intensity", "resume play" and "stop that".

=== Reproduction and development ===
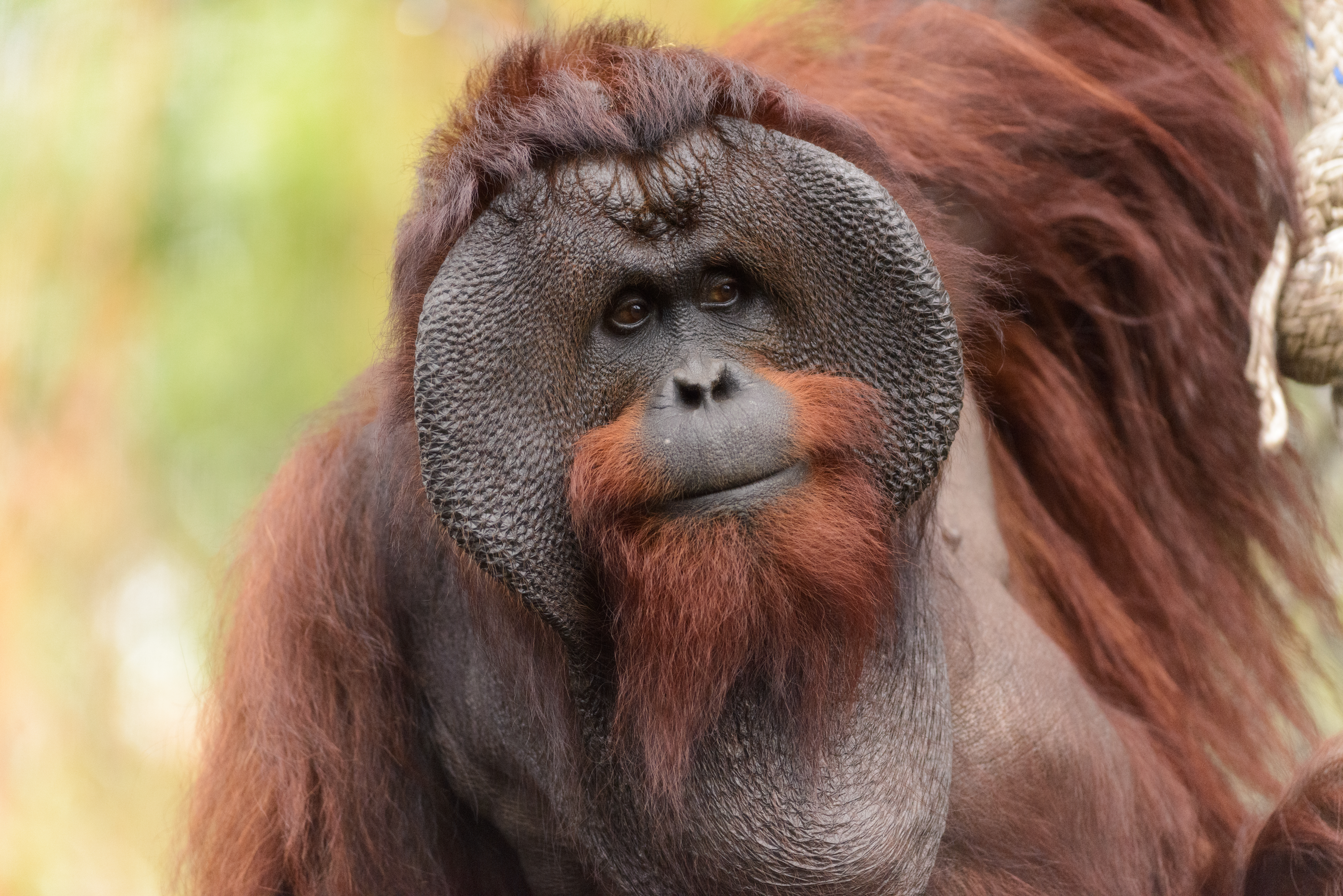
Flanged male orangutan

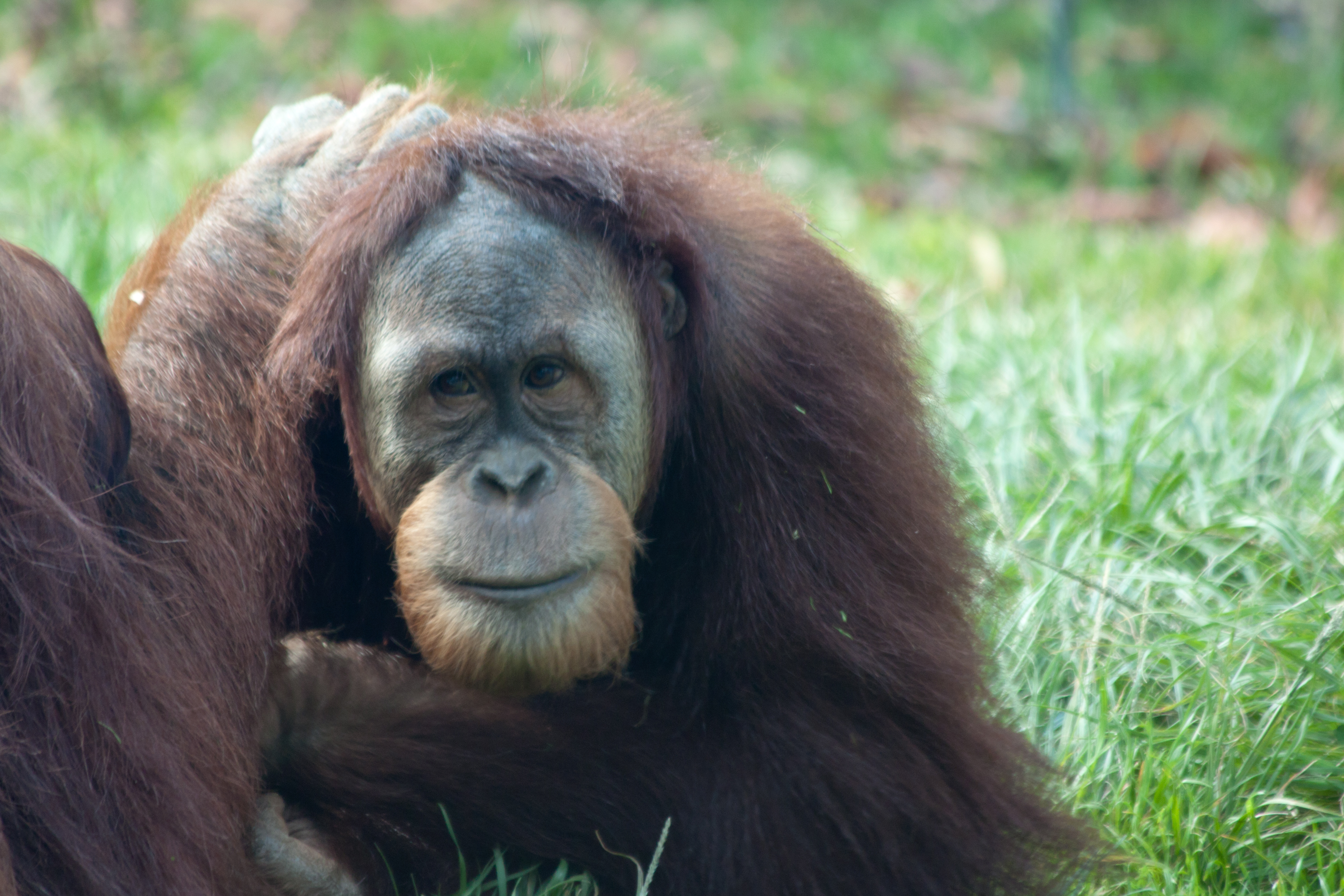
Unflanged male orangutan

Males become sexually mature at around age 15. They may exhibit arrested development by not developing the distinctive cheek pads, pronounced throat pouches, long fur, or long calls until a resident dominant male is absent. The transformation from unflanged to flanged can occur quickly. Flanged males attract sexually respective females with their characteristic long calls, which may also suppress development in younger males.

Unflanged males try to achieve reproductive success by searching for and forcing copulation on females; forced copulation by orangutans is unusually high among mammals. Females prefer to mate with the fitter flanged males, forming pairs with them and benefiting from their protection. Non-ovulating females do not usually resist copulation with unflanged males, as the chance of conception is low. Homosexual behaviour has been recorded in the context of both affiliative and aggressive interactions.

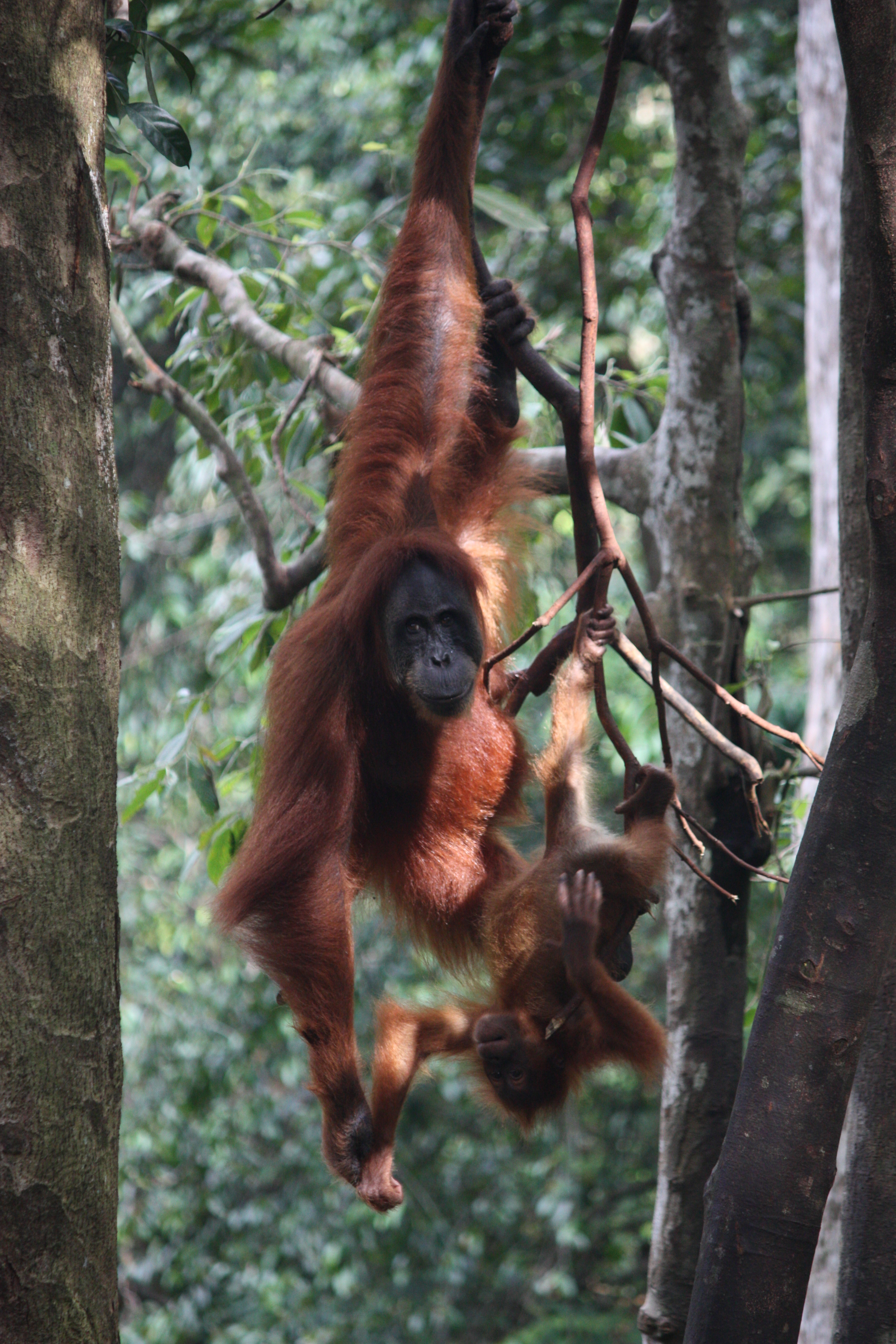
Mother orangutan with young

Unlike females of other non-human great ape species, orangutans do not exhibit sexual swellings to signal fertility. A female first gives birth around 15 years of age and they have a six- to nine-year interbirth interval, the longest among the great apes. Gestation is around nine months long and infants are born at a weight of 1.5–2 kg (3.3–4.4 lb). Usually only a single infant is born; twins are a rare occurrence. Unlike many other primates, male orangutans do not seem to practise infanticide. This may be because they cannot ensure they will sire a female's next offspring, because she does not immediately begin ovulating again after her infant dies. There is evidence that females with offspring under six years old generally avoid adult males.

Females do most of the caring of the young. During its first four months, the infant clings to its mother's belly for transport, though its physical dependency on her declines after that. When an orangutan reaches the age of one-and-a-half years, it can travel with other orangutans while holding hands, a behaviour known as "buddy travel". After two years of age, juvenile orangutans will begin to move away from their mothers temporarily. They reach adolescence at six or seven years of age and are able to live alone but retain some connections with their mothers. Females may nurse their offspring for up to eight years, which is more than any other mammal. Typically, orangutans live over 30 years both in the wild and in captivity.

=== Nesting ===
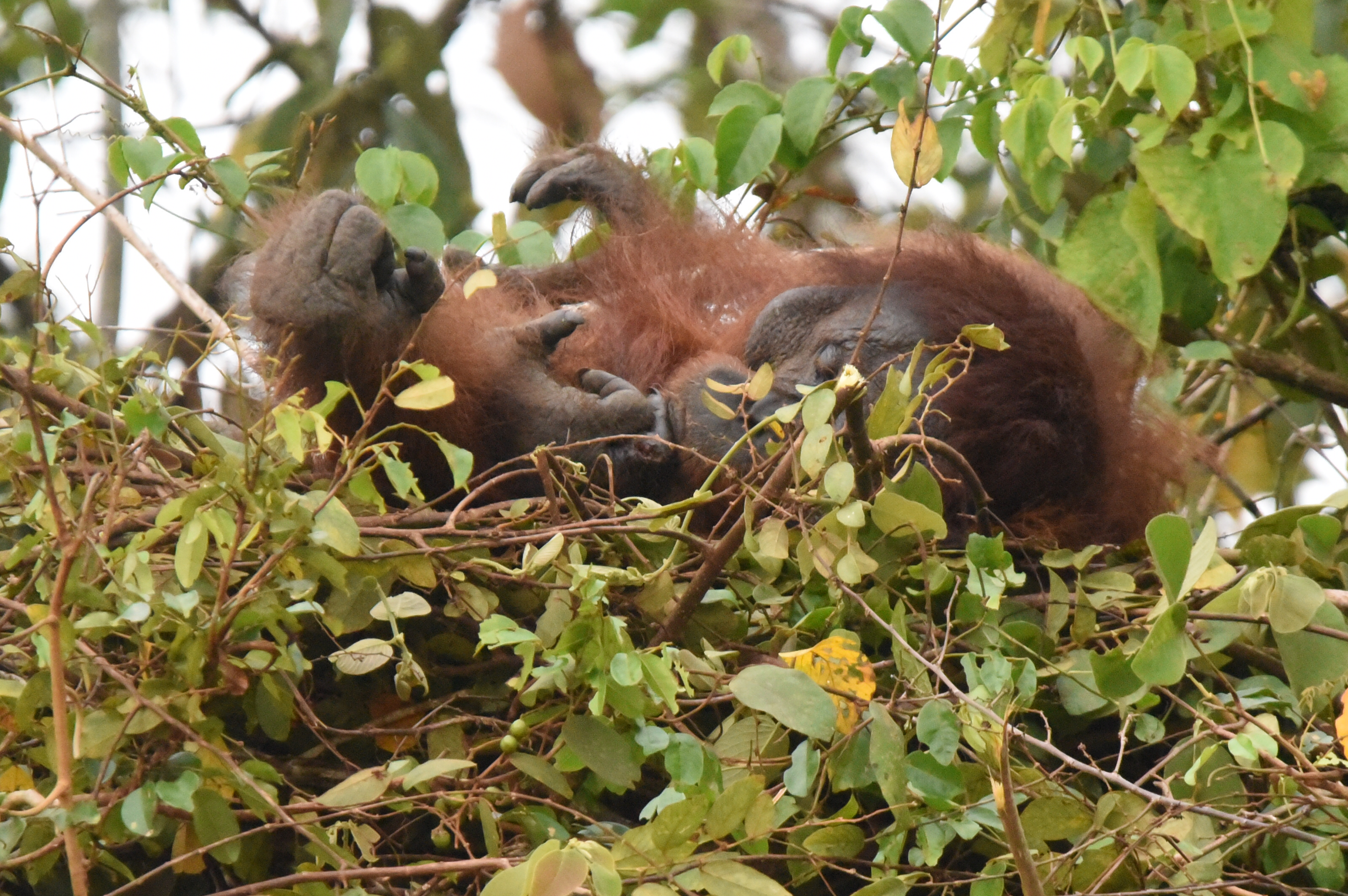
An orangutan lying in a nest

Orangutans build nests specialised for either day or night use. These are carefully constructed; young orangutans learn from observing their mother's nest-building behaviour. In fact, nest-building allows young orangutans to become less dependent on their mother. From six months of age onwards, orangutans practise nest-building and gain proficiency by the time they are three years old.

Construction of a night nest is done by following a sequence of steps. Initially, a suitable tree is located. Orangutans are choosy about sites, though nests can be found in many tree species. To establish a foundation, the ape grabs the large branches under it and bends them so they join. The orangutan then does the same to smaller, leafier branches to create a "mattress". After this, the ape stands and braids the tips of branches into the mattress. Doing this increases the stability of the nest. Orangutans make their nests more comfortable by creating "pillows", "blankets", "roofs" and "bunk-beds".

== Intelligence ==
An orangutan imitating human speech

Orangutans are among the most intelligent non-human primates. Experiments suggest they can track the displacement of objects both visible and hidden. Zoo Atlanta has a touch-screen computer on which their two Sumatran orangutans play games. A 2008 study of two orangutans at the Leipzig Zoo showed orangutans may practise "calculated reciprocity", which involves an individual aiding another with the expectation of being paid back. Orangutans are the first nonhuman species documented to do so.

In a 1997 study, two captive adult orangutans were tested with the cooperative pulling paradigm. Without any training, the orangutans succeeded in pulling off an object to get food in the first session. Over the course of 30 sessions, the apes succeeded more quickly, having learned to coordinate. An adult orangutan has been documented to pass the mirror test, indicating self-awareness, while another test with a 2-year-old failed to reveal self-recognition.

Studies in the wild indicate that flanged male orangutans plan their movements in advance and signal them to other individuals. Experiments have also suggested that orangutans can communicate about things that are not present: mother orangutans remain silent in the presence of a perceived threat but when it passes, the mother produces an alarm call to their offspring to teach them about the danger. Orangutans and other great apes show laughter-like vocalisations in response to physical contact such as wrestling, play chasing or tickling. This suggests that laughter derived from a common origin among primate species and therefore evolved before the origin of humans. Orangutans can learn to mimic new sounds by purposely controlling the vibrations of their vocal folds, a trait that led to speech in humans. Bonnie, an orangutan at the US National Zoo, was recorded spontaneously whistling after hearing a caretaker. She appears to whistle without expecting a food reward.

=== Tool use and culture ===
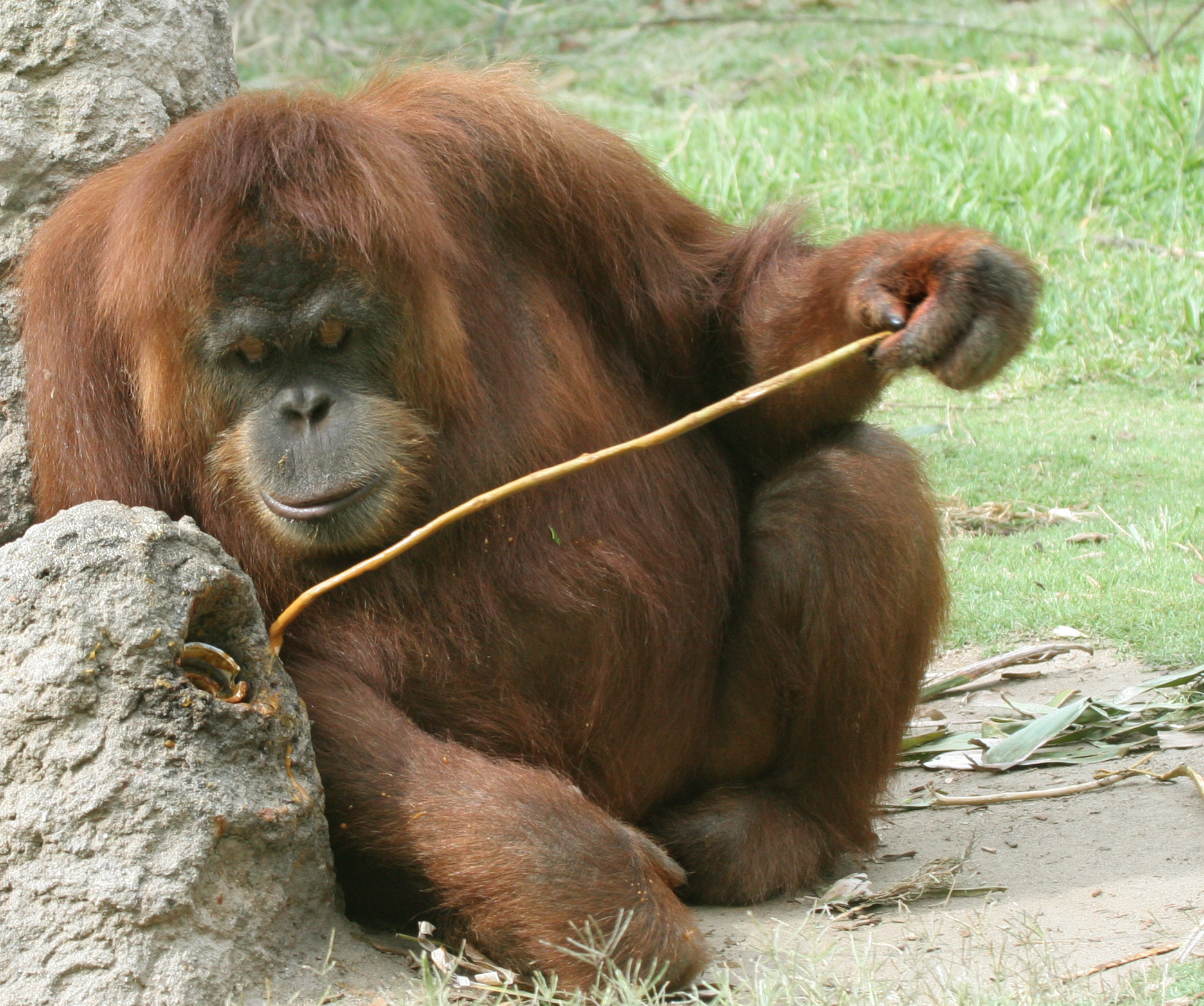
An orangutan at the San Diego Zoo using a tool to extract orange-juice concentrate

Tool use in orangutans was observed by primatologist Biruté Galdikas in ex-captive populations. Orangutans in Suaq Balimbing were recorded to develop a tool kit for use in foraging which consisted of both insect-extraction sticks for use in the hollows of trees and seed-extraction sticks for harvesting seeds from hard-husked fruit. The orangutans adjusted their tools according to the task at hand, and preference was given to oral tool use. This preference was also found in an experimental study of captive orangutans. Orangutans have been observed to use sticks to poke at catfish, causing them to leap out of the water so the orangutan can grab them. Orangutan have also been documented to keep tools for later. When building a nest, orangutans appear to be able to determine which branches would better support their body weight.

Primatologist Carel P. van Schaik and biological anthropologist Cheryl D. Knott further investigated tool use in different wild orangutan populations. They compared geographic variations in tool use related to the processing of Neesia fruit. The orangutans of Suaq Balimbing were found to be avid users of insect and seed-extraction tools when compared to other wild orangutans. The scientists suggested these differences are cultural as they do not correlate with habitat. The orangutans at Suaq Balimbing are closely spaced and relatively tolerant of each other; this creates favourable conditions for the spreading of new behaviours. Further evidence that highly social orangutans are more likely to exhibit cultural behaviours came from a study of leaf-carrying behaviours of formerly captive orangutans that were being rehabilitated on the island of Kaja in Borneo.

Wild orangutans in Tuanan, Borneo, were reported to use tools in acoustic communication. They use leaves to amplify the kiss squeak sounds they produce. The apes may employ this method of amplification to deceive the listener into believing they are larger animals. In 2003, researchers from six different orangutan field sites who used the same behavioural coding scheme compared the behaviours of the animals from each site. They found each orangutan population used different tools. The evidence suggested the differences were cultural: first, the extent of the differences increased with distance, suggesting cultural diffusion was occurring, and second, the size of the orangutans' cultural repertoire increased according to the amount of social contact present within the group. Social contact facilitates cultural transmission.

During a field observation in 2022, a male Sumatran orangutan, known to researchers as Rakus, chewed Fibraurea tinctoria vine leaves and applied the mashed plant material to an open wound on his face. According to primatologists who had been observing Rakus at a nature preserve, "Five days later the facial wound was closed, while within a few weeks it had healed, leaving only a small scar".

=== Personhood ===
In June 2008, Spain would become the first country to recognise the rights of some non-human great apes, based on the guidelines of the Great Ape Project, which are that chimpanzees, bonobos, orangutans, and gorillas are not to be used for animal experiments. In December 2014, a court in Argentina ruled that an orangutan named Sandra at the Buenos Aires Zoo must be moved to a sanctuary in Brazil to provide her "partial or controlled freedom". Animal rights groups like Great Ape Project Argentina argued the ruling should apply to all species in captivity, and legal specialists from the Argentina's Federal Chamber of Criminal Cassatio considered the ruling applicable only to non-human hominids.

== Orangutans and humans ==
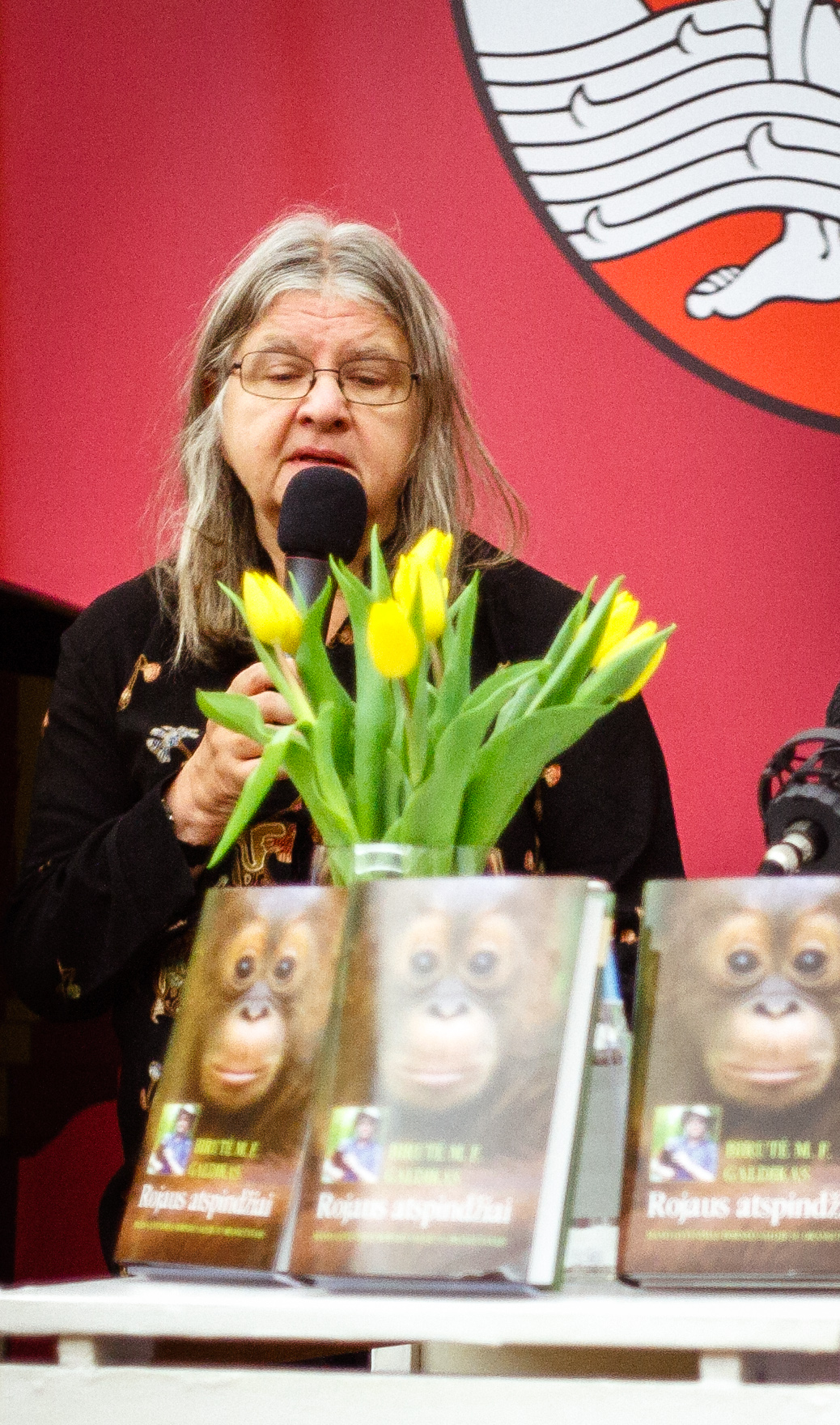
Orangutan researcher Biruté Galdikas presenting her book about the apes

Orangutans were known to the native people of Sumatra and Borneo for millennia. The apes are known as maias in Sarawak and mawas in other parts of Borneo and in Sumatra. While some communities hunted them for food and decoration, others placed taboos on such practices. In central Borneo, some traditional folk beliefs consider it bad luck to look an orangutan in the face. Some folk tales involve orangutans mating with and kidnapping humans. There are even stories of hunters being captured by female orangutans.

Europeans became aware of the existence of the orangutan in the 17th century. Explorers in Borneo hunted them extensively during the 19th century. In 1779, Dutch anatomist Petrus Camper, who observed the animals and dissected some specimens, gave the first scientific description of the orangutan. Camper mistakenly thought that flanged and unflanged male orangutans were different species, a misconception corrected after his death.

Little was known about orangutan behaviour until the field studies of Biruté Galdikas, who became a leading authority on the apes. When she arrived in Borneo in 1971, Galdikas settled into a primitive bark-and-thatch hut at a site she dubbed Camp Leakey, in Tanjung Puting. She studied orangutans for the next four years and developed her PhD thesis for UCLA. Galdikas became an outspoken advocate for orangutans and the preservation of their rainforest habitat, which is rapidly being devastated by loggers, palm oil plantations, gold miners, and unnatural forest fires. Along with Jane Goodall and Dian Fossey, Galdikas is considered to be one of Leakey's Angels, named after anthropologist Louis Leakey.

=== In fiction ===
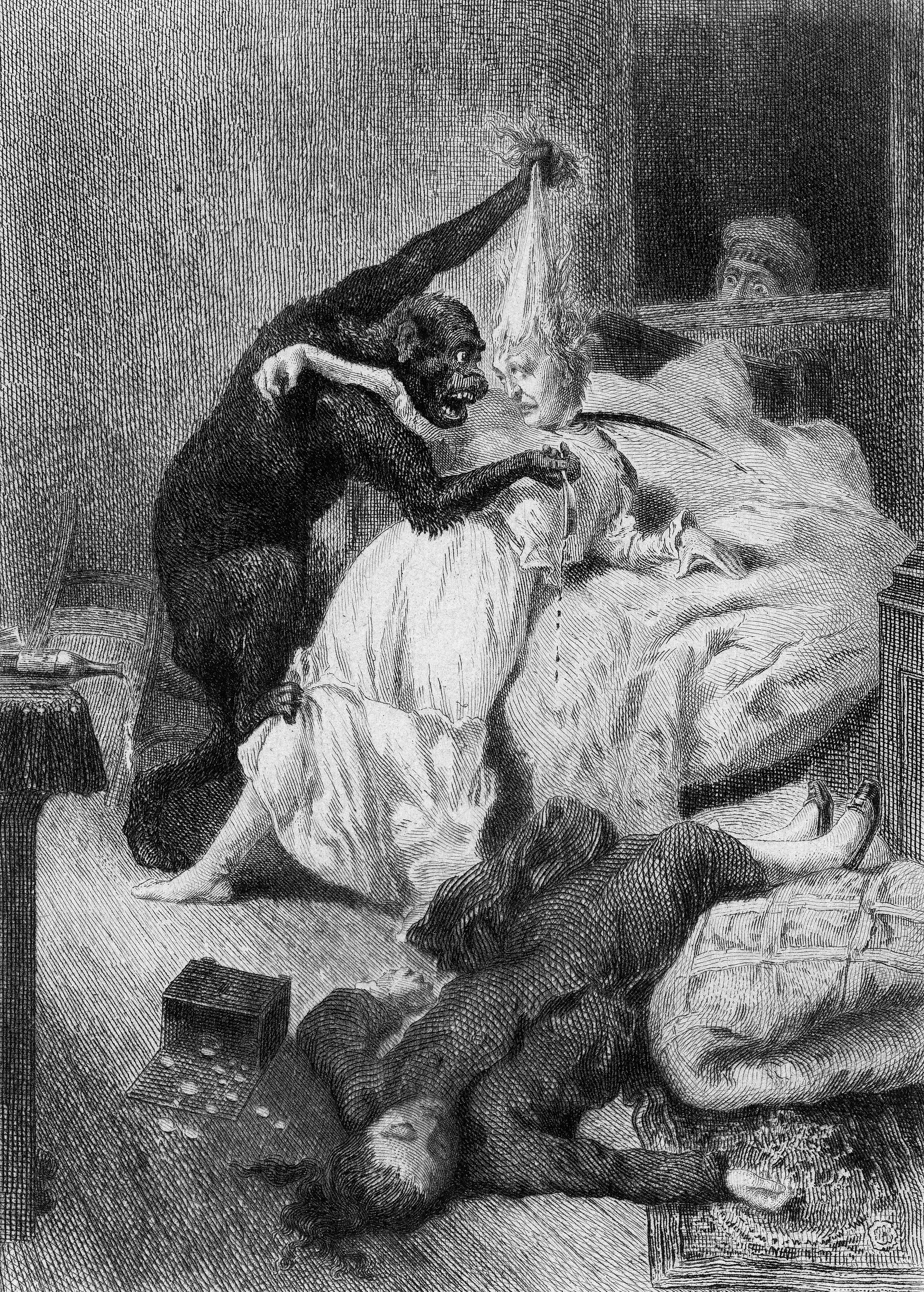
In fiction, orangutans are sometimes shown as antagonists, like in Edgar Allan Poe's short story "The Murders in the Rue Morgue". An 1870 illustration by Daniel Vierge.

Orangutans first appeared in Western fiction in the 18th century and have been used to comment on human society. Written by the pseudonymous A. Ardra, Tintinnabulum naturae (The Bell of Nature, 1772) is told from the point of view of a human-orangutan hybrid who calls himself the "metaphysician of the woods". Around 50 years later, the anonymously written work The Orang Outang is narrated by a pure orangutan in captivity in the US, writing a letter critiquing Boston society to her friend in Java.

Thomas Love Peacock's 1817 novel Melincourt features Sir Oran Haut Ton, an orangutan who lives among English people and becomes a candidate for Member of Parliament. The novel satirises the class and political system of Britain. Oran's purity and status as a "natural man" stands in contrast to the immorality and corruption of the "civilised" humans. In Frank Challice Constable's The Curse of Intellect (1895), the protagonist Reuben Power travels to Borneo and captures an orangutan to train it to speak so he can "know what a beast like that might think of us". Orangutans are featured prominently in the 1963 science fiction novel Planet of the Apes by Pierre Boulle and the media franchise derived from it. They are typically portrayed as bureaucrats like Dr. Zaius, the science minister.

Orangutans are sometimes portrayed as antagonists, notably in the 1832 Walter Scott novel Count Robert of Paris and the 1841 Edgar Allan Poe short story "The Murders in the Rue Morgue". Disney's 1967 animated musical adaptation of The Jungle Book added a jazzy orangutan named King Louie, who tries to get Mowgli to teach him how to make fire. The 1986 horror film Link features an intelligent orangutan which serves a university professor but has sinister motives; he plots against humanity and stalks a female student assistant. Other stories have portrayed orangutans helping humans, such as The Librarian in Terry Pratchett's fantasy novels Discworld and in Dale Smith's 2004 novel What the Orangutan Told Alice. More comical portrayals of the orangutan include the 1996 film Dunston Checks In.

=== In captivity ===
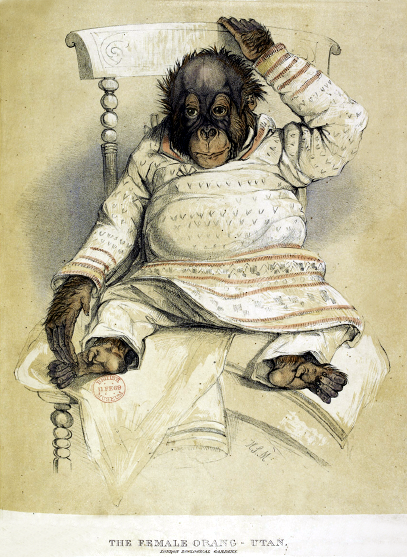
The Female Orang – Utan (Jenny sitting in a chair) c. 1830s

By the early 19th century, orangutans were being kept in captivity. In 1817, an orangutan joined several other animals in London's Exeter Exchange. He rejected the company of other animals, aside from a dog, and preferred to be with humans. He was occasionally taken on coach rides clothed in a smock-frock and hat and even given drinks at an inn where he behaved politely for the hosts. The London Zoo housed a female orangutan named Jenny who was dressed in human clothing and learned to drink tea. She is remembered for her meeting with Charles Darwin who compared her reactions to those of a human child.

Zoos and circuses in the Western world would continue to use orangutans and other simians as sources for entertainment, training them to behave like humans at tea parties and to perform tricks. Notable orangutan "character actors" include: Jacob and Rosa of the Tierpark Hagenbeck in Hamburg, Germany, in the early 20th century; Joe Martin of Universal City Zoo in the 1910s and 1920s; and Jiggs of the San Diego Zoo in the 1930s and 1940s. Animal rights groups have urged a stop to such acts, considering them abusive. Starting in the 1960s, zoos became more concerned with education and orangutans' exhibits were designed to mimic their natural environment and let them display their natural behaviours. Ken Allen, an orangutan of the San Diego Zoo, became world famous in the 1980s for multiple escapes from his enclosures. He was nicknamed "the hairy Houdini" and was the subject of a fan club, T-shirts, bumper stickers and a song titled The Ballad of Ken Allen.

Galdikas reported that her cook was sexually assaulted by a captive male orangutan. The ape may have suffered from a skewed species identity and forced copulation is a standard mating strategy for low-ranking male orangutans. American animal trafficker Frank Buck claimed to have seen human mothers acting as wet nurses to orphaned orangutan babies in hopes of keeping them alive long enough to sell to a trader, which would be an instance of human–animal breastfeeding.

Scientific research has noted that orangutans in zoos have displayed some behavioral differences to their wild counterparts, including whistling, paternal care, and increased curiosity.

== Conservation ==
=== Status and threats ===
All three species are critically endangered according to the IUCN Red List of mammals. They are legally protected from capture, harm or killing in both Malaysia and Indonesia, and are listed under Appendix I by CITES, which prohibits their unlicensed trade under international law. The Bornean orangutan range has become more fragmented, with few or no apes documented in the southeast. The largest remaining population is found in the forest around the Sabangau River, but this environment is at risk. The Sumatran orangutan is found only in the northern part of Sumatra, most of the population inhabiting the Leuser Ecosystem. The Tapanuli orangutan is found only in the Batang Toru forest of Sumatra.

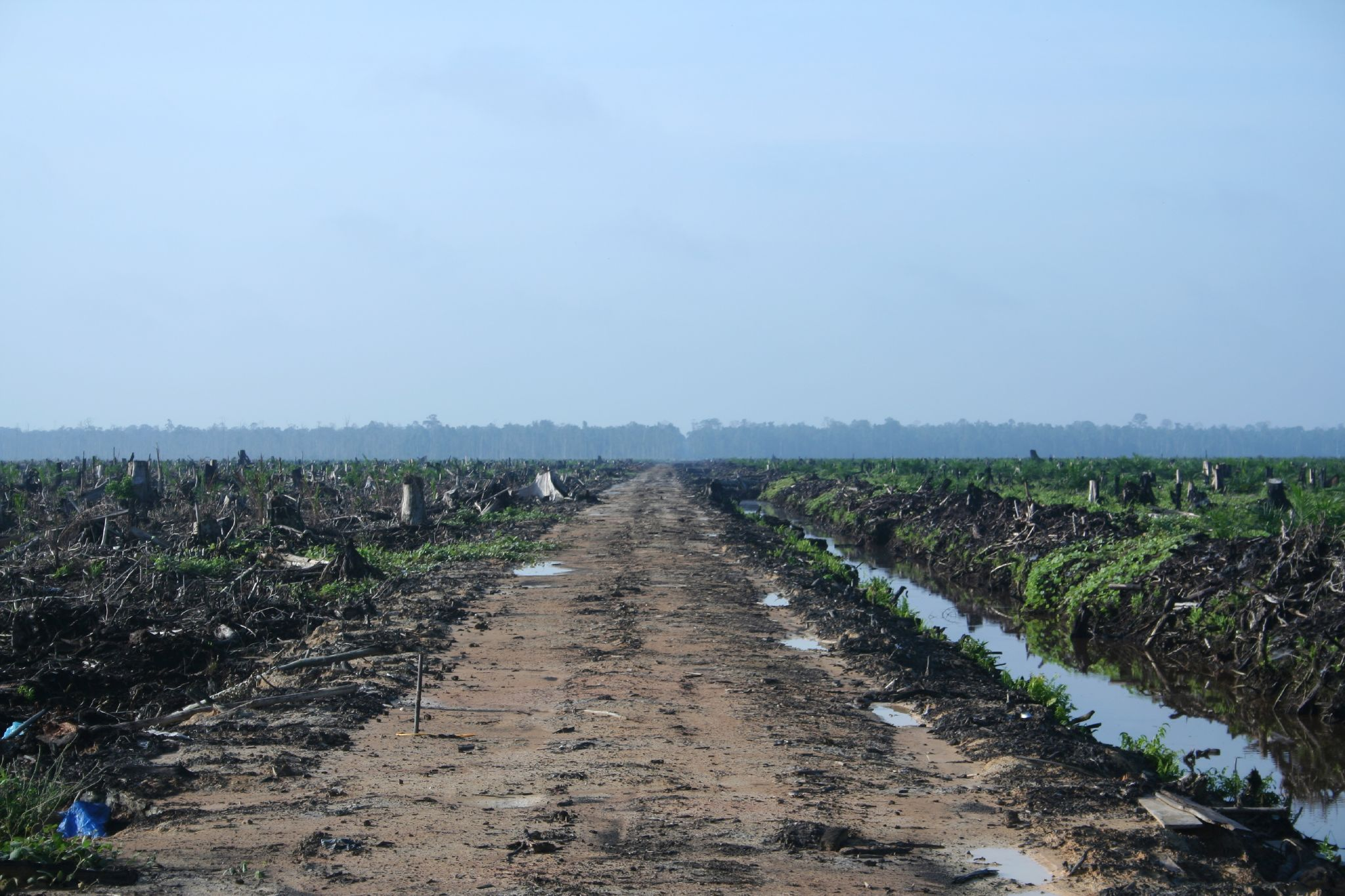
Deforestation for palm oil production in Indonesia

Biruté Galdikas wrote that orangutans were already threatened by poaching and deforestation when she began studying them in 1971. By the 2000s, orangutan habitats decreased rapidly because of logging, mining and fragmentation by roads. A major factor has been the conversion of vast areas of tropical forest to palm oil plantations in response to international demand. Hunting is also a major problem, as is the illegal pet trade.

Orangutans may be killed for the bushmeat trade and bones are secretly sold in souvenir shops in several cities in Indonesian Borneo. Conflicts between locals and orangutans also pose a threat. Orangutans that have lost their homes often raid agricultural areas and end up being killed by villagers. Locals may also be motivated to kill orangutans for food or because of their perceived danger. Mother orangutans are killed so their infants can be sold as pets. Between 2012 and 2017, the Indonesian authorities, with the aid of the Orangutan Information Center, seized 114 orangutans, 39 of which were pets.

Estimates in the 2000s found that around 6,500 Sumatran orangutans and around 54,000 Bornean orangutans remain in the wild. A 2016 study estimates a population of 14,613 Sumatran orangutans in the wild, twice that of previous population estimates, while 2016 estimates suggest 104,700 Bornean orangutans exist in the wild. A 2018 study found that Bornean orangutans declined by 148,500 individuals from 1999 to 2015. Fewer than 800 Tapanuli orangutans are estimated to still exist, which puts the species among the most endangered of the great apes.

=== Conservation centres and organisations ===
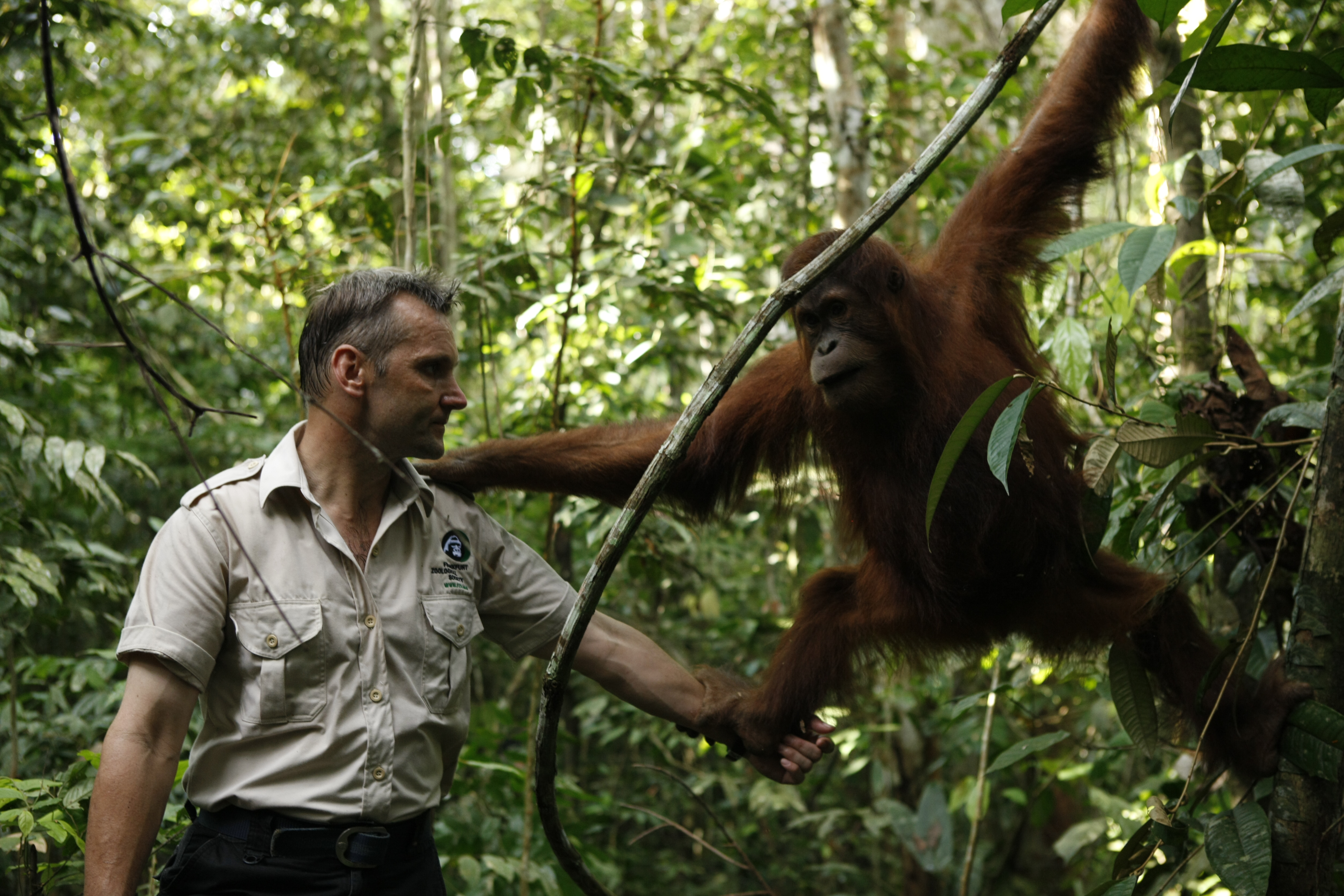
Zoologische Gesellschaft Frankfurt Programm Director Peter Pratje works with orangutans in Bukit Tigapuluh, Indonesia.

Several organisations are working for the rescue, rehabilitation and reintroduction of orangutans. The largest of these is the Borneo Orangutan Survival (BOS) Foundation, founded by conservationist Willie Smits and which operates projects such as the Nyaru Menteng Rehabilitation Program founded by conservationist Lone Drøscher Nielsen.

A female orangutan was rescued from a village brothel in Kareng Pangi village, Central Kalimantan, in 2003. The orangutan was shaved and chained for sexual purposes. Since being freed, the orangutan, named Pony, has been living with the BOS. She has been re-socialised to live with other orangutans. In May 2017, the BOS rescued an albino orangutan, later named Alba, from captivity in a remote village in Kapuas Hulu, on the island of Kalimantan in Indonesian Borneo. According to volunteers at BOS, albino orangutans are extremely rare (one in ten thousand). This is the first albino orangutan the organisation has seen in 25 years of activity.

Other major conservation centres in Indonesia include those at Tanjung Puting National Park, Sebangau National Park, Gunung Palung National Park and Bukit Baka Bukit Raya National Park in Borneo and the Gunung Leuser National Park and Bukit Lawang in Sumatra. In Malaysia, conservation areas include Semenggoh Wildlife Centre and Matang Wildlife Centre also in Sarawak, and the Sepilok Orangutan Rehabilitation Centre in Sabah. Major conservation centres headquartered outside the orangutans' home countries include Frankfurt Zoological Society, Orangutan Foundation International, which was founded by Galdikas, and the Australian Orangutan Project. Conservation organisations such as the Orangutan Land Trust work with the palm oil industry to improve sustainability and encourages the industry to establish conservation areas for orangutans.

== See also ==
- International Primate Day
- List of individual apes
- Monkey Day
- Orang Pendek
- Orangutan Island
- Skullduggery (1970 film)
