= Jenny (orangutan) =

Orangutan kept in captivity in London Zoo during the 1830s

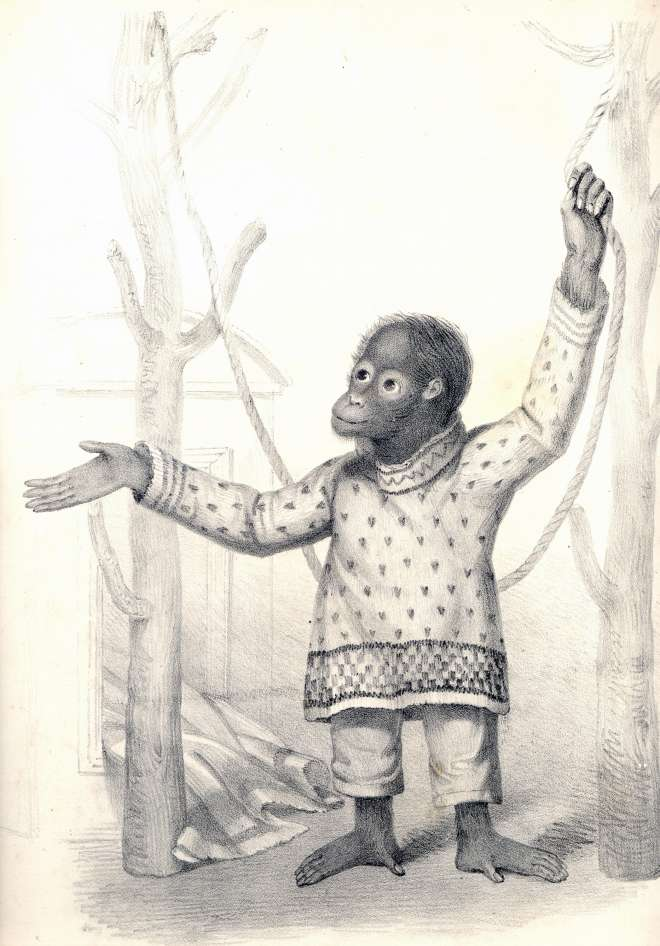
- Portrait of Jenny. Printed by W. Clerk, London, 1837.
- Other name: Lady Jane
- Species: Bornean orangutan
- Sex: Female
- Born: c. 1834; Borneo
- Died: May 28, 1839 (aged 4–5); London Zoo
- Cause of death: illness
- Known for: Meeting Charles Darwin
- Residence: London Zoo

Lady Jane, known as Jenny, (c. 1834 – 28 May 1839) was a Bornean orangutan kept in captivity in London Zoo between November 1837 and her death in May 1839. She was the first of her species at the Zoo and is remembered for her meeting with the naturalist Charles Darwin who compared her reactions to those of a human child. The experience reinforced Darwin's view that human beings were "created from animals". He wrote in his notebook that after meeting an animal like Jenny, no man could "boast of his proud preeminence".

== Early life ==
Jenny arrived at London Zoo from Borneo in November 1837, after being sold by a returning sailor called Mr Moss for £150. She was three years old at the time and the first orangutan to be shown at the zoo, where she was placed in a heated giraffe house. She wore human clothing and learned to drink tea.

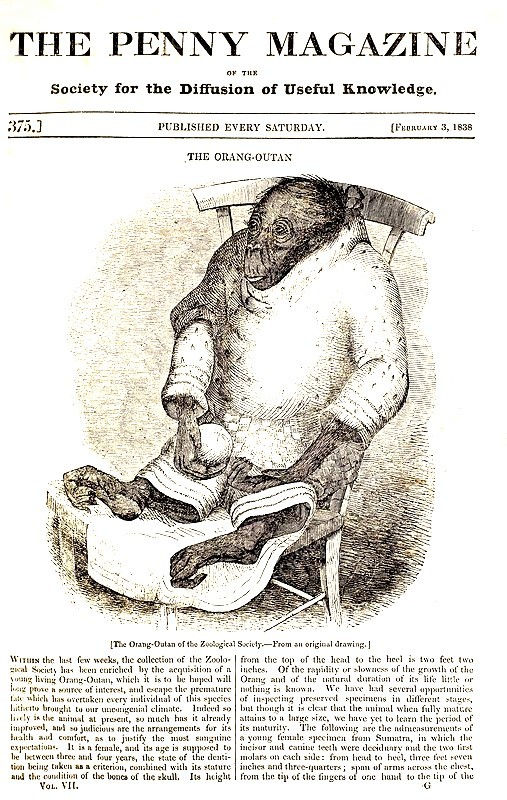
Jenny on the cover of The Penny Magazine, 1838.

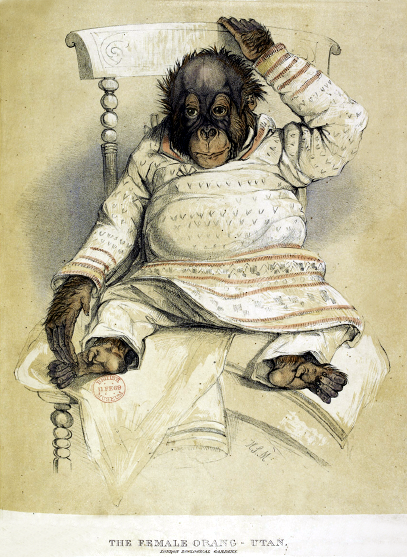
The Female Orang – Utan (A possibly later "Jenny" sitting in a chair by Henry Stacy Marks. n.d.)

== Meeting with Charles Darwin ==
On 28 March 1838, two years after returning from his world tour on the Beagle and more than 20 years before he presented his theory of evolution, Charles Darwin paid a visit to London Zoo and saw Jenny, which was the first time he had seen a non-human ape. In 1837, he had begun a series of notebooks in which he theorised about human evolution. He wrote to his sister about Jenny in 1838:

the keeper showed her an apple, but would not give it her, whereupon she threw herself on her back, kicked & cried, precisely like a naughty child.— She then looked very sulky & after two or three fits of pashion, the keeper said, "Jenny if you will stop bawling & be a good girl, I will give you the apple."— She certainly understood every word of this, &, though like a child, she had great work to stop whining, she at last succeeded, & then got the apple, with which she jumped into an arm chair & began eating it, with the most contented countenance imaginable.

Jenny's reaction reminded Darwin of the behaviour of children, and he noted that she showed facial expressions of "rage, sulkiness and despair". He made further visits to Jenny in September and October of that year and felt certain that she understood what he said. His notes also reveal that Jenny could obey instructions such as being asked to open a door, position herself ready for grooming and giving some things up. He noted her jealousy of others and that she had particularly bonded with two zookeepers.

When Darwin studied Jenny's response to looking at her own reflection in a mirror, he noted that she was "astonished beyond measure". Darwin wrote in his notes that Jenny "looked at it every way, sideways, & with most steady surprise. After some time stuck out lips, like kissing, to glass", "put hand behind glass at various distances, looked over it, rubbed front of glass, made faces at it", "examined whole glass", "look at it startled & seemed almost frightened, & evidently became cross because it could not understand puzzle", and "put body in all kinds of positions when approaching glass to examine it".

For Darwin, the visits to Jenny with her human-like emotions reinforced his view that human beings were "created from animals". He wrote in his notebook C:

Let man visit Ouranoutang in domestication, hear expressive whine, see its intelligence when spoken [to]; as if it understands every word said – see its affection. – to those it knew. – see its passion & rage, sulkiness, & very actions of despair; ... and then let him boast of his proud preeminence.

...Man in his arrogance thinks himself a great work, worthy the interposition of a deity. More humble and I believe true to consider him created from animals.

== Death and legacy ==
Jenny died from an illness on 28 May 1839. Darwin's notes on Jenny are kept at the Darwin Archive at Cambridge University Library. There is no evidence that any of Jenny's skeleton or skin were preserved.

After Jenny's death, the zoo acquired another female orangutan who, by tradition, was also named Jenny. The second Jenny was visited by Queen Victoria and Prince Albert.

The scene of Darwin entering Jenny's cage was re-created in the film Creation (2009), with Paul Bettany playing Darwin.

== See also ==
- List of individual apes
- The Descent of Man, and Selection in Relation to Sex by Charles Darwin (1871)
- The Expression of the Emotions in Man and Animals by Charles Darwin (1872)
