= Taggart Siegel =

American documentary filmmaker

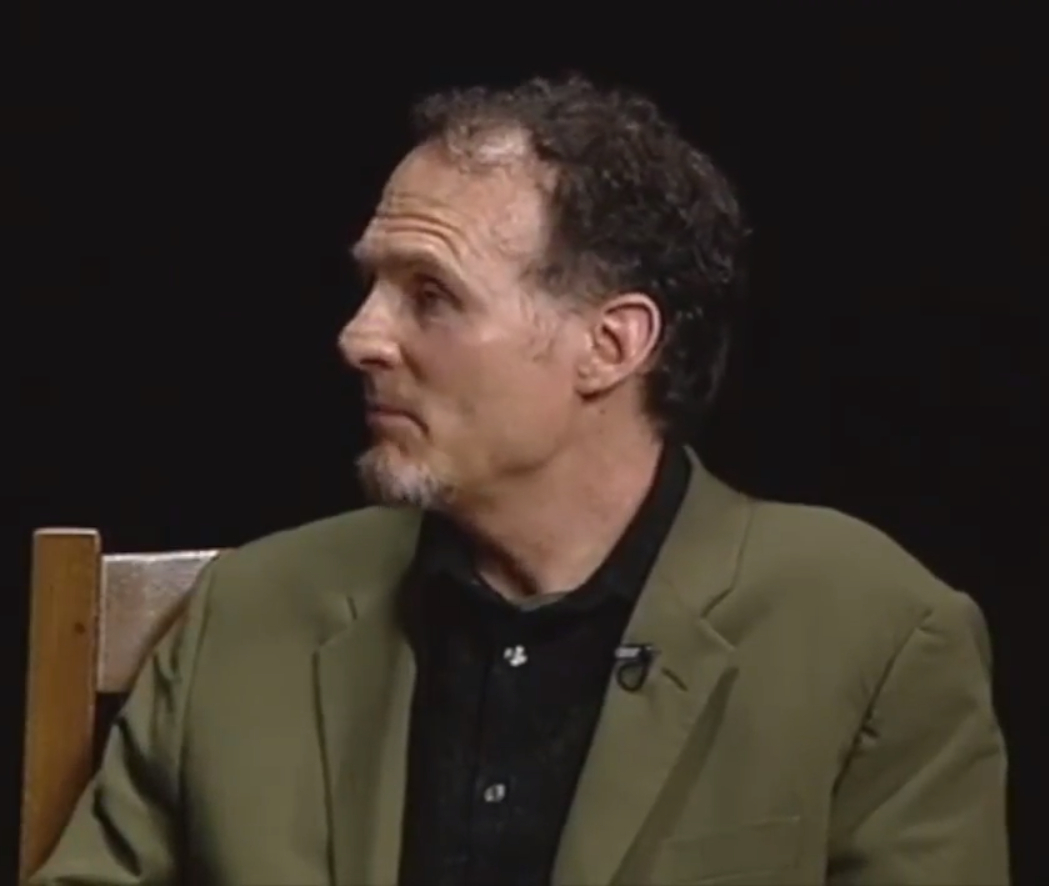
Taggart Siegel

Taggart Siegel is an American documentary filmmaker. For 30 years, he has produced and directed Emmy-nominated, award-winning documentaries and dramas that reflect cultural diversity. He is co-founder of Collective Eye Films, a nonprofit media production and distribution organization.

== Films ==
The Real Dirt on Farmer John (2005) has won 31 international film festival awards, including the 2005 Nashville Film Festival Reel Current Award selected by Al Gore. The film was featured on Independent Lens.

The Disenchanted Forest (1999) follows endangered orphan orangutans on the island of Borneo as they are rehabilitated and returned to their rainforest home. It centres on the three main Borneo Orangutan Survival Foundation (BOS) projects - Wanariset, Nyaru Menteng and Mawas. It is narrated by Brooke Shields.

The Split Horn: Life of a Hmong Shaman in America and Between Two Worlds follow the story of Hmong people adapting to life in America. Both films have aired on Public Broadcasting Corporation. Between Two Worlds was nominated for an Emmy Award in 2004.

== Filmography ==
=== Documentaries ===
Year	Film	Credit
1984	Bitter Harvest	Director/Producer/DP/Editor
1986	Between Two Worlds	Director/Producer/Editor
1988	Blue Collar and Buddha	Director/Producer
1990	Heart Broken In Half	Director/Producer/Editor
1999	The Disenchanted Forest	Producer/DP
2001	The Split Horn: Life of a Hmong Shaman in America	Director/Producer/DP/Editor
2005	The Real Dirt on Farmer John	Director/Producer/DP
2010	Queen of the Sun	Director/Producer
2016	Seed: The Untold Story	Director

=== Fictional Work ===
Year	Film	Credit
1983	Affliction	Director/Producer/DP/Editor
1989	Ember Days	Director/Producer/Editor
1992	Wild Blue Moon	Director/Producer/Writer
1994	Body Memories	Director/Producer
1996	Destroying Angel	Producer
1998	The Beloved	Producer
