= Collective Eye Films =

Collective Eye Films is a non-profit documentary production and distribution organization based in Portland, Oregon. The organization was first established in 2004 in San Francisco, California, as a documentary production and distribution collective. Collective Eye Films fulfills its mission of "unearthing stories to make a difference", through continued production and the distribution of over 120 feature documentaries. Since 1984 Collective Eye Films has created documentary films that explore various social, political, environmental, and spiritual issues and causes.

== Executive producer ==
The co-founder and President of Collective Eye is Taggart Siegel. Taggart Siegel is also an Emmy-nominated and award-winning American filmmaker.

== Collective Eye–produced films ==
- Between Two Worlds
- Bitter Harvest
- Blue Collar & Buddha
- Body Memories
- The Disenchanted Forest
- The Heart Broken in Half
- Purdah (film)
- The Real Dirt on Farmer John
- The Split Horn: Life of a Hmong Shaman In America]
- Seed: The Untold Story
- Queen of The Sun

== Films distributed by Collective Eye Films ==
- Arresting Power: Resisting Police Violence in Portland, Oregon
