= Purdah (film) =

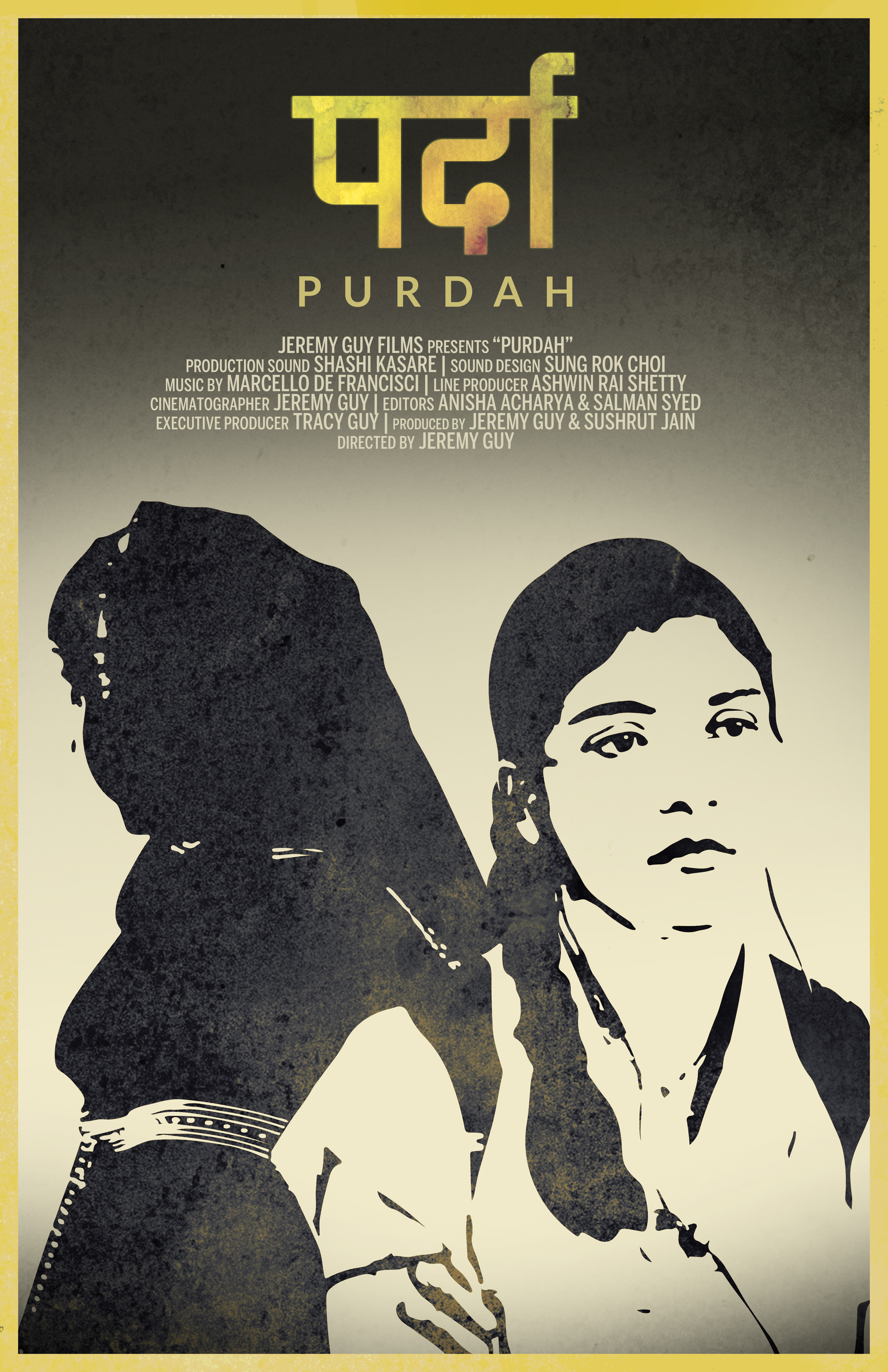
- Directed by: Jeremy Guy
- Produced by: Jeremy Guy; Sushrut Jain
- Starring: Kaikasha Mirza; Saba Mirza; Al Heena Mirza
- Cinematography: Jeremy Guy
- Edited by: Anisha Acharya; Salman Syed
- Music by: Marcello De Francisci
- Production company: Jeremy Guy Films
- Distributed by: Indie Rights; Collective Eye Films
- Release date: March 3, 2018 (Cinequest Film Festival)
- Running time: 71 minutes
- Countries: India; United States

Purdah is an independent documentary film directed by Jeremy Guy, starring Kaikasha Mirza, Saba Mirza, and Al Heena Mirza. The title, Purdah, refers to a veil or screen and can also refer to something that Muslim women wear to keep hidden. The documentary is filmed in a cinéma vérité style. Purdah premiered at the Cinequest Film Festival in March 2018.

== Synopsis ==
Purdah begins in Mumbai, India in 2011 and introduces Kaikasha Mirza who dreams of playing cricket but knows no other Muslim women like herself who are allowed to play. Having just recently been allowed by her father to remove her burka for the first time to play the sport, Kaikasha sets her sights on making the Mumbai Senior Women's Cricket Team. Kaikasha is faced with the harsh judgment of her community and family for her pursuits. All of Kaikasha's hopes are pinned on her upcoming tryouts after her parents tell her that they will arrange her marriage if she cannot make a career out of the sport.

The documentary also follows the rest of the Mirza family, including Kaikasha's sisters, Saba and Heena. Each of the sisters has goals for her own career and future, but faces an uphill battle against poverty and intense societal pressure while trying to follow her dreams. Purdah is the story of how the harsh realities for women in India creates an unexpected outcome for the Mirza family.

== Cast ==
- Kaikasha Mirza
- Saba Mirza
- Al Heena Mirza

== Release ==
Purdah had its film festival run in 2018 and 2019, premiering at the Cinequest Film Festival. Purdah went on to screen at the TCL Chinese Theatre in Hollywood as part of Dances With Films. The film subsequently played at several more festivals around the world, including the Indian Film Festival Stuttgart, Indian Film Festival of Melbourne, Chicago South Asian Film Festival, Indian Film Festival of Houston, Fünf Seen Filmfestival, South Asian Film Festival of Montreal, River to River Florence Indian Film Festival, Indian Film Festival Münster, Imagine India International Film Festival, and the Big Syn International Film Festival London.

Purdah was also screened at the 2019 Association for Asian Studies Annual Conference to be used as an educational tool. The academic conference gathers university professors and students to discuss issues, literature, film, and art within the field of Asian Studies.

Purdah is distributed internationally by Indie Rights on Video on Demand platforms such as Amazon Prime Video and iTunes, and via educational distributor Collective Eye Films to universities and libraries.

== Music ==
The soundtrack for Purdah was released on February 22, 2019.

== Critical reception ==
Purdah was reviewed by Phantom Tollbooth critic, Marie Asner, who rated the film 4 out of 5. Asner interprets the documentary by considering it to have two contrasting segments, separated by a three-year gap in filming. The review highlights how the immersive camera "becomes part of the family and then part of the population," conveying emotion as well as context within India. Asner later included Purdah on her list of the best independent films of 2019.

Bobby Lepire rated Purdah a 7 out of 10 in a review for Film Threat. Lepire writes that the film's "narrative in the first half lacks weight and context," but praised that "the film picks up later on, and the ending is uplifting and empowering, which makes the film worth watching."

Purdah currently holds a 100% critic approval rating from critics on the online review aggregator Rotten Tomatoes.

== Accolades ==
- 2019 Named one of the Best Independent Films of 2019 by Marie Asner of Phantom Tollbooth
- 2019 Big Syn International Film Festival London - Winner of the Grand Jury's Special Mention Award
- 2018 Dances With Films - Winner 3rd Place for Marketing Award
