= Queen of the Sun =

2010 documentary film

Queen of the Sun: What are the Bees Telling Us?
- Directed by: Taggart Siegel
- Produced by: Jon Betz
- Cinematography: Taggart Siegel
- Edited by: Taggart Siegel; Jon Betz
- Music by: Jami Sieber
- Production company: Evan Schiller
- Distributed by: Collective Eye Films
- Release date: April 2010
- Running time: 83 minutes
- Country: United States
- Language: English

Queen of the Sun: What Are the Bees Telling Us? is a 2010 documentary film directed by Taggart Siegel. The film investigates multiple angles of the recent bee epidemic colony collapse disorder. It also explores the historical and contemporary relationship between bees and humans. Featuring interviews from Michael Pollan, Gunther Hauk, Vandana Shiva, Hugh Wilson, Michael Thiele (former bee keeper at Green Gulch Farm), May Berenbaum, Carlo Petrini and Raj Patel.

== Awards ==
The film was an official selection of the 2010 International Documentary Film Festival Amsterdam for the Green Screen Competition. It received the Documentary Audience Award from both the Maui Film Festival and Indie Memphis Film Festival. It was 2010 Pare Lorentz Honorable Mention for the International Documentary Association.
