= Arresting Power: Resisting Police Violence in Portland, Oregon =

- Directed by: Jodi Darby, Julie Perini, Erin Yanke
- Produced by: Jodi Darby, Julie Perini, Erin Yanke
- Distributed by: Collective Eye Films
- Release date: January 15, 2015
- Running time: 84 minutes
- Country: United States
- Language: English

Arresting Power: Resisting Police Violence in Portland, Oregon is a 2015 award-winning documentary film co-directed by Jodi Darby, Julie Perini, and Erin Yanke.

== Synopsis ==
The film showcases the development of conflict between local residents of Portland, Oregon and the law enforcement agencies during the last half century. It also features interviews of victims of police brutality and those by family members of people killed during police action. Interviews by members of Portland's abolition movement have also been included in the documentary. The film uses archival newsreel footage from the Oregon Historical Society along with scenes shot at the locations of police brutalities and tries to showcase a world without the current institution of the police.

The Portland Institute for Contemporary Art partly funded the documentary through the Andy Warhol Regional Re-grant Program which gave the film its 2013 Precipice Fund Project Grant. Supporters of the film made up the rest with donations.

The film has screened at the Northwest Film Center, the Hollywood Theatre (Portland, Oregon), the Clinton Street Theater, the Capitol Theater (Olympia), the Harlem International Film Festival and many other theaters, festivals, art spaces, community spaces around the United States and around the world.

== Awards ==
- John Michaels Award for Social Justice Films, Second Place, Big Muddy Film Festival, Carbondale, Illinois 2015
- Documentary Category, Best of the Northwest Award of Excellence, 2015
- Making a Difference Category, Best of the Northwest Award of Excellence, 2015
