= Mid-Atlantic Apiculture Research and Extension Consortium =

- Founded: 1997
- Type: Professional Organization
- Purpose: beekeeping
- Region served: Mid-Atlantic Region of US
- Method: research and extension work
- Website: https://agdev.anr.udel.edu/maarec/

The Mid-Atlantic Apiculture Research and Extension Consortium (MAAREC), established in 1997, is a regional group focused on addressing the pest management crisis facing the beekeeping industry in the Mid-Atlantic region of the United States. A task force has been established with representation from the departments of agriculture, state beekeeping organizations, and land-grant universities from each of the following states: New Jersey, Maryland, Delaware, Pennsylvania and West Virginia.

MAAREC has been researching alternatives to chemical controls and promotion of less reliance on chemical pesticides for mite control. MAAREC's Colony Collapse Disorder Working Group is investigating colony collapse disorder.
