= Peatland =

Wetland terrain without forest cover, dominated by living, peat-forming plants

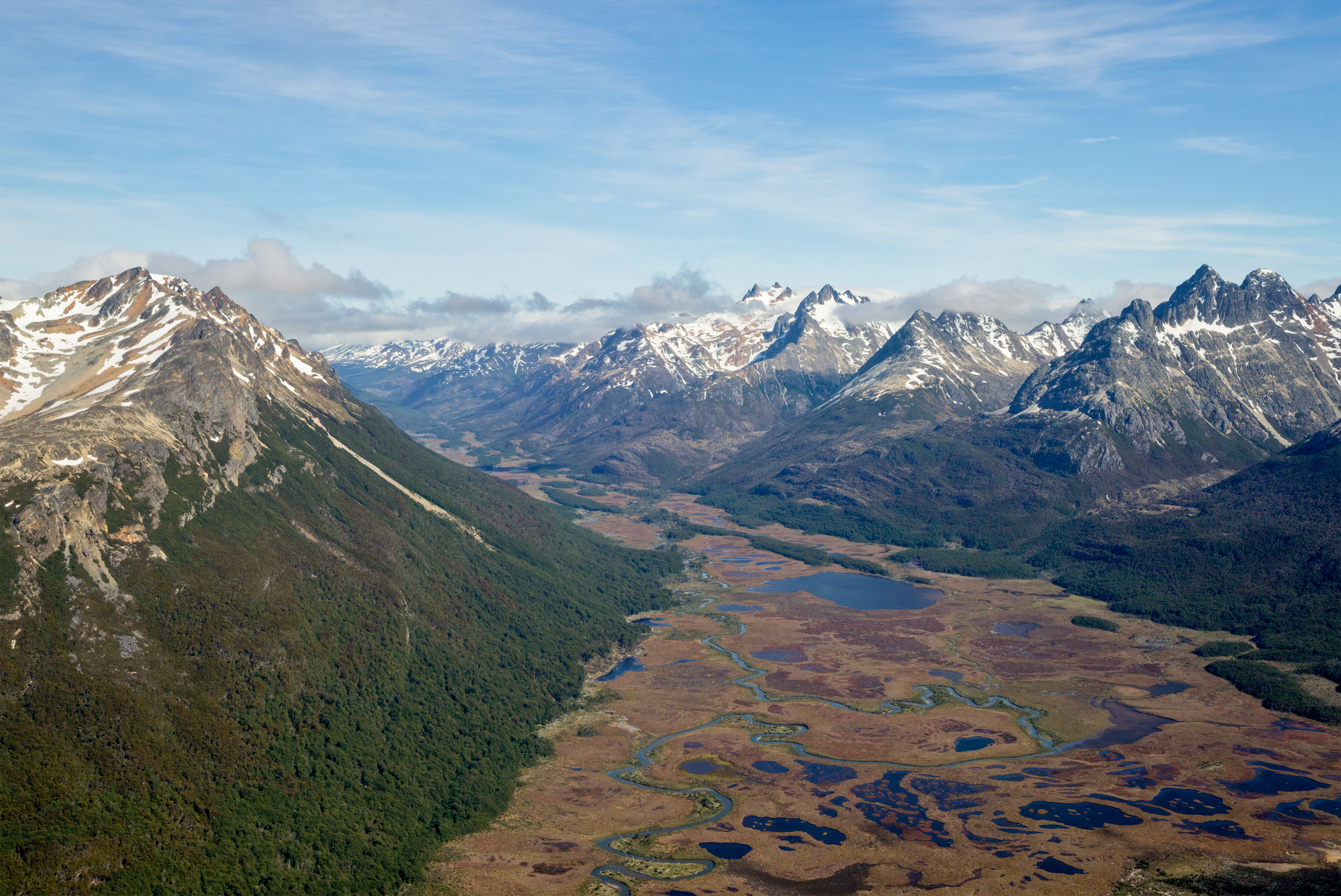
A variety of mire types in Carbajal Valley, Argentina

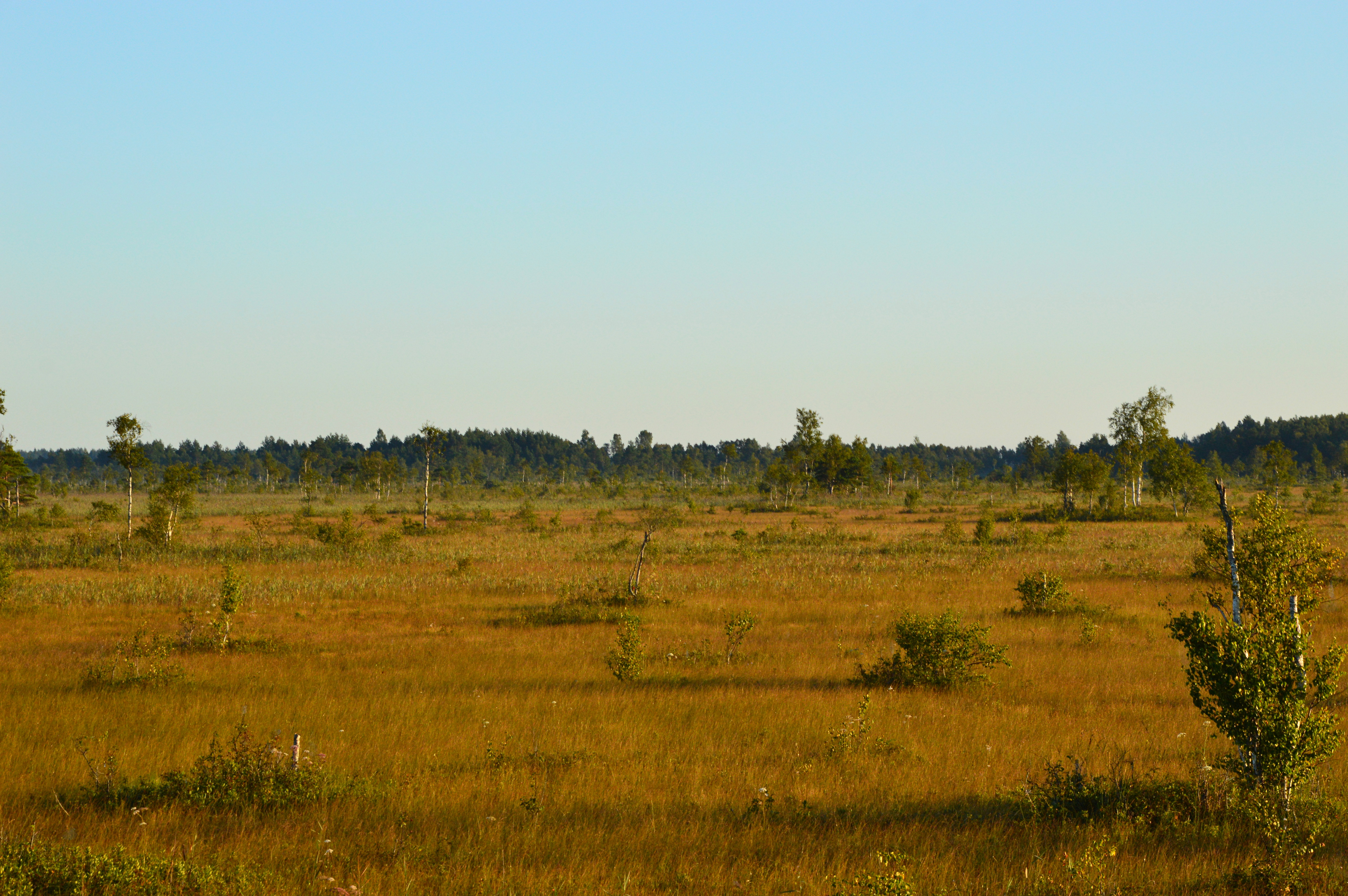
Avaste Fen, one of the largest fens in Estonia

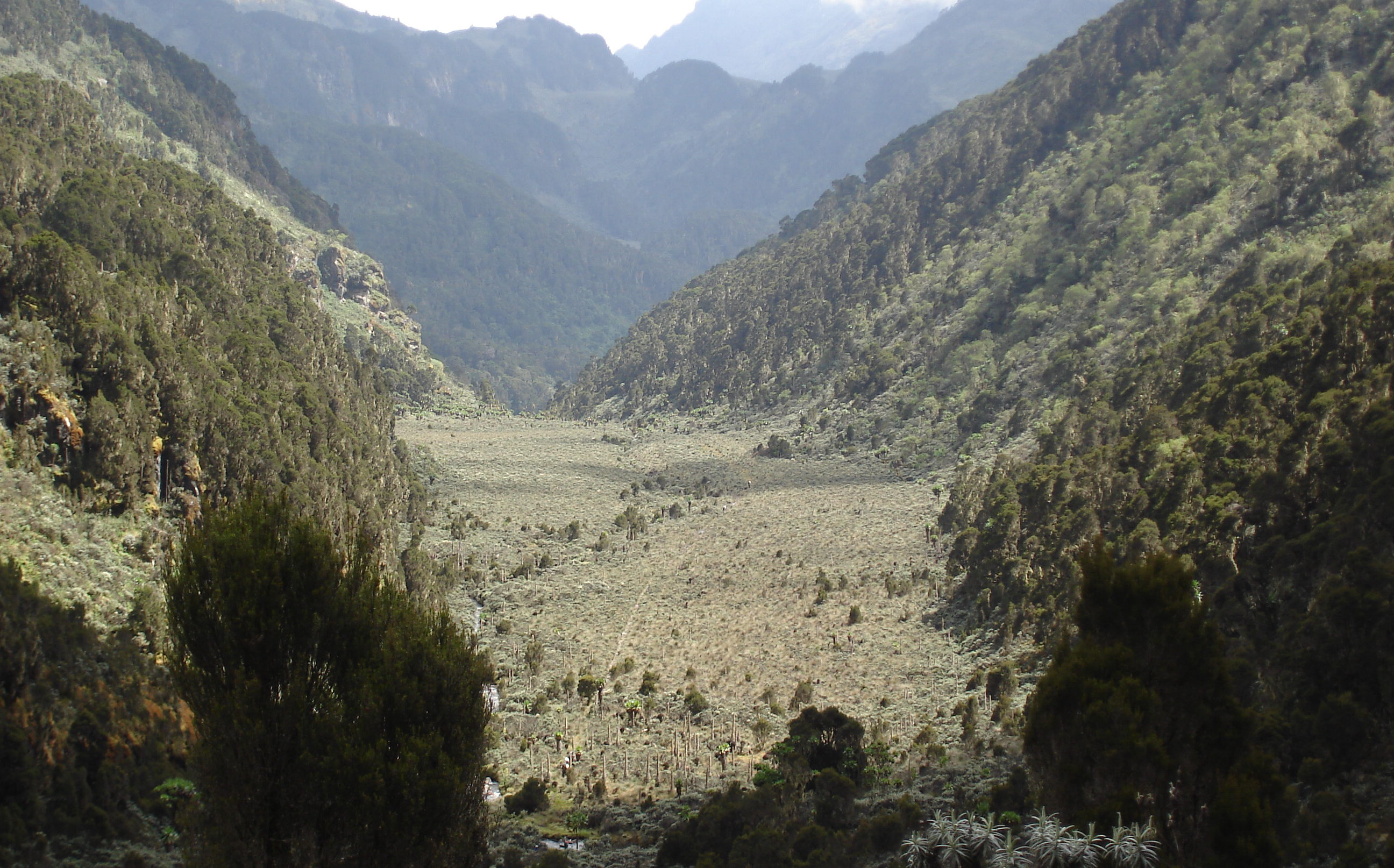
A valley mire creates a level ground surface in otherwise dramatic topography. Upper Bigo Bog, Rwenzori Mountains, Uganda.

A peatland is a type of wetland whose soils consist of organic matter from decaying plants, forming layers of peat. Peatlands arise because of incomplete decomposition of organic matter, usually litter from vegetation, due to water-logging and subsequent anoxia. Peatlands are unusual landforms that derive mostly from biological rather than physical processes, and can take on characteristic shapes and surface patterning.

The formation of peatlands is primarily controlled by climatic conditions such as precipitation and temperature, although terrain relief is a major factor as waterlogging occurs more easily on flatter ground and in basins. Peat formation typically initiates as a paludification of a mineral soil forest, terrestrialisation of lakes, or primary peat formation on bare soils on previously glaciated areas. A peatland that is actively forming peat is called a mire. All types of mires share the common characteristic of being saturated with water, at least seasonally with actively forming peat, while having their own ecosystem.

Peatlands are the largest natural carbon store on land. Covering around 3 million km^{2} globally, they sequester 0.37 gigatons (Gt) of carbon dioxide (CO_{2}) a year. Peat soils store over 600 Gt of carbon, more than the carbon stored in all other vegetation types, including forests. In their natural state, peatlands provide a range of ecosystem services, including minimising flood risk and erosion, purifying water and regulating climate.

Peatlands are under threat by commercial peat harvesting, drainage and conversion for agriculture (notably palm oil in the tropics) and fires, which are predicted to become more frequent with climate change. The destruction of peatlands results in release of stored greenhouse gases into the atmosphere, further exacerbating climate change.

== Types ==
Botanists and ecologists use the word "peatland" as a general term for any terrain dominated by peat to a depth of at least 30 cm (12 in), even if it has been completely drained (i.e. a peatland can be dry). A peatland that is still capable of forming new peat is called a mire, while drained and converted peatlands might still have a peat layer but are not considered mires as the formation of new peat has ceased.

There are two types of mire: bog and fen. A bog is a mire that, due to its raised location relative to the surrounding landscape, obtains all its water solely from precipitation (ombrotrophic). A fen is located on a slope, flat, or in a depression and gets most of its water from the surrounding mineral soil or from groundwater (minerotrophic). Thus, while a bog is always acidic and nutrient-poor, a fen may be slightly acidic, neutral, or alkaline, and either nutrient-poor or nutrient-rich. All mires are initially fens when the peat starts to form, and may turn into bogs once the height of the peat layer reaches above the surrounding land. A quagmire is a floating (quaking) mire, bog, or any peatland being in a stage of hydrosere or hydrarch (hydroseral) succession; it yields underfoot (floating mats). Ombrotrophic types of quagmire may be called quaking bogs (quivering bogs); minerotrophic types can be labelled with the term "quagfen".

Some swamps can also be peatlands (e.g. peat swamp forest), while marshes are generally not considered to be peatlands. Swamps are characterised by their forest canopy or by the presence of other tall and dense vegetation like papyrus. Like fens, swamps typically have a higher pH level and higher nutrient availability than bogs. Some bogs and fens can support limited shrub or tree growth on hummocks. A marsh is a type of wetland within which vegetation is rooted in mineral soil.

== Global distribution ==
PEATMAP showing the global distribution of peatlands

Peatlands are found around the globe, although are at their greatest extent at high latitudes in the Northern Hemisphere. Peatlands are estimated to cover around 3% of the globe's surface, although estimating the extent of their cover worldwide is difficult due to the varying accuracy and methodologies of land surveys from many countries. Mires occur wherever conditions are right for peat accumulation: largely where organic matter is constantly waterlogged. Hence the distribution of mires is dependent on topography, climate, parent material, biota and time. The type of mire—bog, fen, marsh or swamp—depends also on each of these factors.

The largest accumulation of mires constitutes around 64% of global peatlands and is found in the temperate, boreal and subarctic zones of the Northern Hemisphere. Mires are usually shallow in polar regions because of the slow rate of accumulation of dead organic matter, and often contain permafrost and palsas. Very large swathes of Canada, northern Europe and northern Russia are covered by boreal mires. In temperate zones mires are typically more scattered due to historical drainage and peat extraction, but can cover large areas. One example is blanket bog where precipitation is very high i.e., in maritime climates inland near the coasts of the north-east and south Pacific, and the north-west and north-east Atlantic. In the sub-tropics, mires are rare and restricted to the wettest areas.

Mires can be extensive in the tropics, typically underlying tropical rainforest (for example, in Kalimantan, the Congo Basin and Amazon basin). Tropical peat formation is known to occur in coastal mangroves as well as in areas of high altitude. Tropical mires largely form where high precipitation is combined with poor conditions for drainage. Tropical mires account for around 11% of peatlands globally (more than half of which can be found in Southeast Asia), and are most commonly found at low altitudes, although they can also be found in mountainous regions, for example in South America, Africa and Papua New Guinea. Indonesia, particularly on the islands of Sumatra, Kalimantan and Papua, has one of the largest peatlands in the world, with an area of about 24 million hectares. These peatlands play an important role in global carbon storage and have very high biodiversity. However, peatlands in Indonesia also face major threats from deforestation and forest fires. In the early 21st century, the world's largest tropical mire was found in the Central Congo Basin, covering 145,500 km^{2} and storing up to 10^{13} kg of carbon.

The total area of mires has declined globally due to drainage for agriculture, forestry and peat harvesting. For example, more than 50% of the original European mire area which is more than 300,000 km^{2} has been lost. Some of the largest losses have been in Russia, Finland, the Netherlands, the United Kingdom, Poland and Belarus. A catalog of the peat research collection at the University of Minnesota Duluth provides references to research on worldwide peat and peatlands.

== Biochemical processes ==
The carbon cycle within peatlands

Peatlands have unusual chemistry that influences, among other things, their biota and water outflow. Peat has very high cation-exchange capacity due to its high organic matter content: cations such as Ca²⁺ are preferentially adsorbed onto the peat in exchange for H^{+} ions. Water passing through peat declines in nutrients and pH. Therefore, mires are typically nutrient-poor and acidic unless the inflow of groundwater (bringing in supplementary cations) is high.

Generally, whenever the inputs of carbon into the soil from dead organic matter exceed the carbon outputs via organic matter decomposition, peat is formed. This occurs due to the anoxic state of water-logged peat, which slows down decomposition. Peat-forming vegetation is typically also recalcitrant (poorly decomposing) due to high lignin and low nutrient content. Topographically, accumulating peat elevates the ground surface above the original topography. Mires can reach considerable heights above the underlying mineral soil or bedrock: peat depths of above 10 m have been commonly recorded in temperate regions (many temperate and most boreal mires were removed by ice sheets in the last Ice Age), and above 25 m in tropical regions.^{[7]} When the absolute decay rate of peat in the catotelm (the lower, water-saturated zone of the peat layer) matches the rate of input of new peat into the catotelm, the mire will stop growing in height.^{[8]}

=== Carbon storage and methanogenesis ===
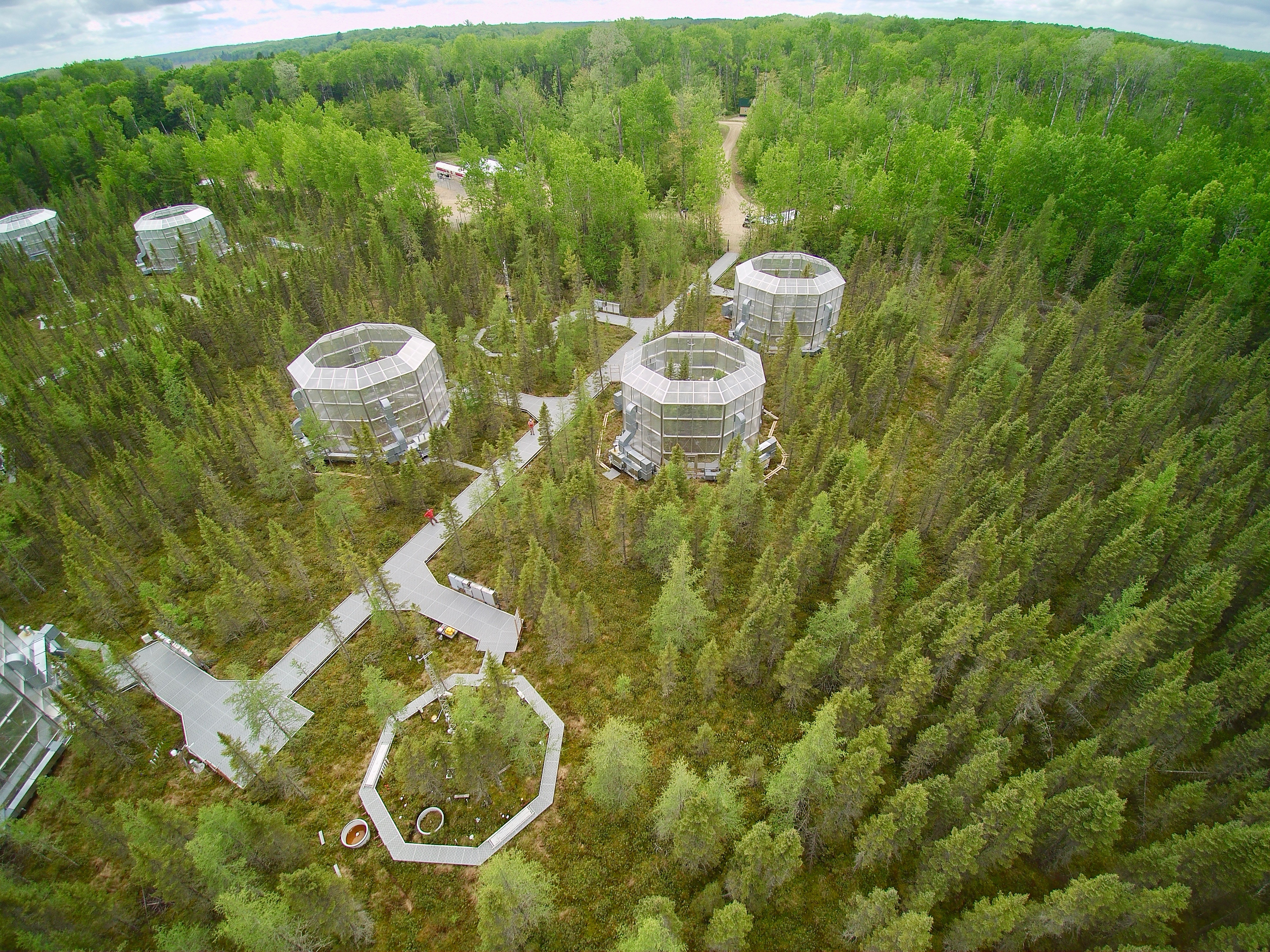
US scientists use the Spruce and Peatland Responses Under Changing Environments experiment in Minnesota to assess the response of northern peatlands to increases in temperature and atmospheric carbon dioxide.

Despite accounting for just 3% of Earth's land surfaces, peatlands are collectively a major carbon store containing between 500 and 700 billion tonnes of carbon. Carbon stored within peatlands equates to over half the amount of carbon found in the atmosphere. Peatlands interact with the atmosphere primarily through the exchange of carbon dioxide, methane and nitrous oxide, and can be damaged by excess nitrogen from agriculture or rainwater. The sequestration of carbon dioxide takes place at the surface via the process of photosynthesis, while losses of carbon dioxide occur through living plants via autotrophic respiration and from the litter and peat via heterotrophic respiration. In their natural state, mires are a small atmospheric carbon dioxide sink through the photosynthesis of peat vegetation, which outweighs their release of greenhouse gases. On the other hand, most mires are generally net emitters of methane and nitrous oxide. Due to the continued CO_{2} sequestration over millennia, and because of the longer atmospheric lifespan of the CO_{2} molecules compared with methane and nitrous oxide, peatlands have had a net cooling effect on the atmosphere.

The water table position of a peatland is the main control of its carbon release to the atmosphere. When the water table rises after a rainstorm, the peat and its microbes are submerged under water inhibiting access to oxygen, reducing CO_{2} release via respiration. Carbon dioxide release increases when the water table falls lower, such as during a drought, as this increases the availability of oxygen to the aerobic microbes thus accelerating peat decomposition. Levels of methane emissions also vary with the water table position and temperature. A water table near the peat surface gives the opportunity for anaerobic microorganisms to flourish.

Methanogens are strictly anaerobic organisms and produce methane from organic matter in anoxic conditions below the water table level, while some of that methane is oxidised by methanotrophs above the water table level. Therefore, changes in water table level influence the size of these methane production and consumption zones. Increased soil temperatures also contribute to increased seasonal methane flux. A study in Alaska found that methane may vary by as much as 300% seasonally with wetter and warmer soil conditions due to climate change.

Peatlands are important for studying past climate because they are sensitive to changes in the environment and can reveal levels of isotopes, pollutants, macrofossils, metals from the atmosphere and pollen. For example, carbon-14 dating can reveal the age of the peat. The dredging and destruction of a peatland will release the carbon dioxide that could reveal irreplaceable information about the past climatic conditions. Many kinds of microorganisms inhabit peatlands, due to the regular supply of water and abundance of peat forming vegetation. These microorganisms include but are not limited to methanogens, algae, bacteria, zoobenthos, of which Sphagnum species are most abundant.

=== Humic substances ===
Peat contains substantial organic matter, where humic acid dominates. Humic materials can store substantial amounts of water, making them an essential component in the peat environment, contributing to increased carbon storage due to the resulting anaerobic condition. If the peatland is dried from long-term cultivation and agricultural use, it will lower the water table, and the increased aeration will release carbon. Upon extreme drying, the ecosystem can undergo a state shift, turning the mire into a barren land with lower biodiversity and richness. Humic acid formation occurs during the biogeochemical degradation of vegetation debris and animal residue. The loads of organic matter in the form of humic acid is a source of precursors of coal. Prematurely exposing the organic matter to the atmosphere promotes the conversion of organics to carbon dioxide to be released in the atmosphere.

== Use by humans ==
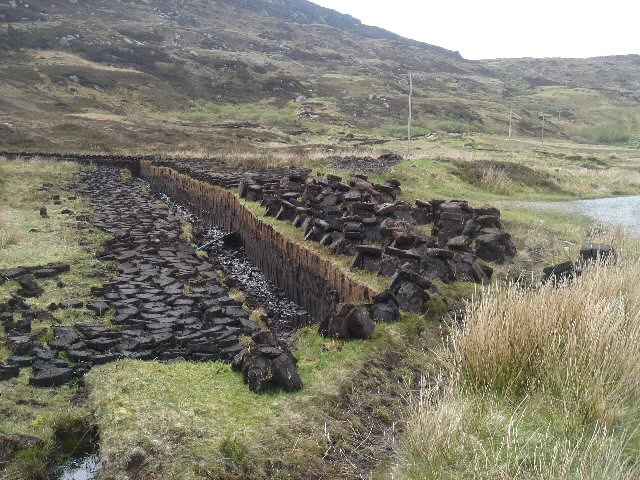
Extraction of peat from derelict blanket bog, South Uist, Scotland. This old bog is no longer forming peat because the vegetation has been changed, and therefore it is not a mire.

Records of past human behaviour and environments can be contained within peatlands. These may take the form of human artefacts, or palaeoecological and geochemical records.

Peatlands are used by humans in modern times for a range of purposes, the most dominant being agriculture and forestry, which accounts for around a quarter of global peatland area. This involves cutting drainage ditches to lower the water table with the intended purpose of enhancing the productivity of forest cover or for use as pasture or cropland. Agricultural uses for mires include the use of natural vegetation for hay crop or grazing, or the cultivation of crops on a modified surface. In addition, the commercial extraction of peat for energy production is widely practiced in Northern European countries, such as Russia, Sweden, Finland, Ireland and the Baltic states.

Tropical peatlands comprise 0.25% of Earth's terrestrial land surface but store 3% of all soil and forest carbon stocks. The use of this land by humans, including draining and harvesting of tropical peat forests, results in the emission of large amounts of carbon dioxide into the atmosphere. In addition, fires occurring on peatland dried by the draining of peat bogs release even more carbon dioxide. The economic value of a tropical peatland was once derived from raw materials, such as wood, bark, resin and latex, the extraction of which did not contribute to large carbon emissions. In Southeast Asia, peatlands are drained and cleared for human use for a variety of reasons, including the production of palm oil and timber for export in primarily developing nations. This releases stored carbon dioxide and prevents the system from sequestering carbon again.

== Tropical peatlands ==
The global distribution of tropical peatlands is concentrated in Southeast Asia where agricultural use of peatlands has been increased in recent decades. Large areas of tropical peatland have been cleared and drained for the production of food and cash crops such as palm oil. Large-scale drainage of these plantations often results in subsidence, flooding, fire and deterioration of soil quality. Small-scale encroachment on the other hand, is linked to poverty and is so widespread that it also has negatively impacts these peatlands.

The biotic and abiotic factors controlling Southeast Asian peatlands are interdependent. Its soil, hydrology and morphology are created by the present vegetation through the accumulation of its own organic matter, building a favourable environment for this specific vegetation. This system is therefore vulnerable to changes in hydrology or vegetation cover. These peatlands are mostly located in developing regions with impoverished and rapidly growing populations. These lands have become targets for commercial logging, paper pulp production and conversion to plantations through clear-cutting, drainage and burning. Drainage of tropical peatlands alters the hydrology and increases their susceptibility to fire and soil erosion, as a consequence of changes in physical and chemical compositions. The change in soil strongly affects the sensitive vegetation and forest die-off is common. The short-term effect is a decrease in biodiversity but the long-term effect, since these encroachments are hard to reverse, is a loss of habitat. Poor knowledge about peatlands' sensitive hydrology and lack of nutrients often lead to failing plantations, resulting in increasing pressure on remaining peatlands.

=== Biology and peat characteristics ===
Tropical peatland vegetation varies with climate and location. Three different characterisations are mangrove woodlands present in the littoral zones and deltas of salty water, followed inland by swamp forests. These forests occur on the margin of peatlands with a palm rich flora with trees 70 m tall and 8 m in girth accompanied by ferns and epiphytes. The third, padang, from the Malay and Indonesian word for forest, consists of shrubs and tall thin trees and appear in the centre of large peatlands. The diversity of woody species, like trees and shrubs, are far greater in tropical peatlands than in peatlands of other types. Peat in the tropics is therefore dominated by woody material from trunks of trees and shrubs and contain little to none of the sphagnum moss that dominates in boreal peatlands. It's only partly decomposed and the surface consists of a thick layer of leaf litter. Forestry in peatlands leads to drainage and rapid carbon losses since it decreases inputs of organic matter and accelerate the decomposition. In contrast to temperate wetlands, tropical peatlands are home to several species of fish. Many new, often endemic, species have been discovered but many of them are considered threatened.

=== Greenhouse gases and fires ===
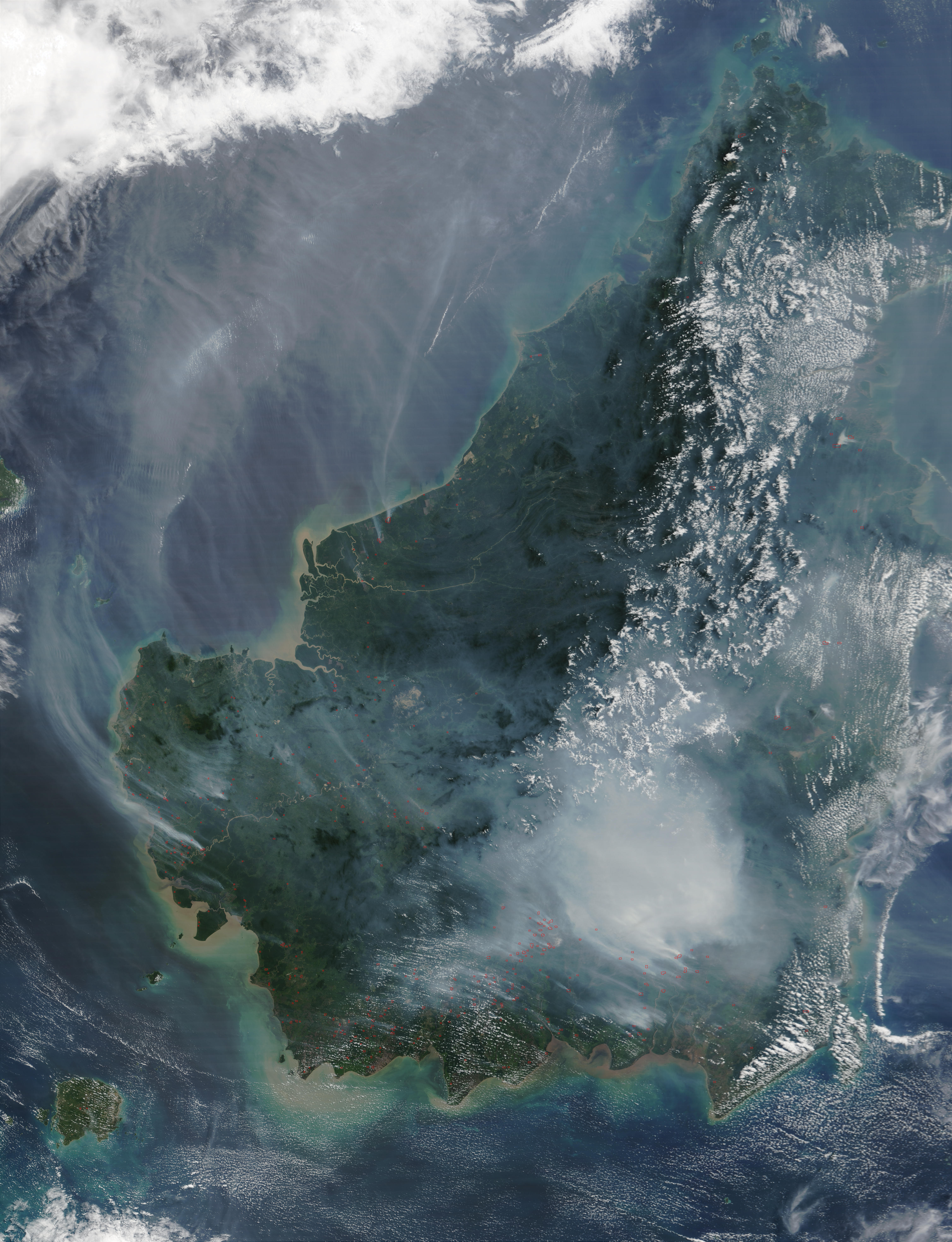
Satellite image of burning tropical peat swamp, Borneo. In 1997 alone, 73000 ha of swamp was burned in Borneo, releasing the same amount of carbon as 13-40% of the mean annual global carbon emissions of fossil fuels. The majority of this carbon was released from peat rather than overlying tropical rainforest.

The tropical peatlands in Southeast Asia only cover 0.2% of Earth's land area but CO_{2} emissions are estimated to be 2 Gt per year, equal to 7% of global fossil fuel emissions. These emissions get bigger with drainage and burning of peatlands and a severe fire can release up to 4,000 t of CO_{2}/ha. Burning events in tropical peatlands are becoming more frequent due to large-scale drainage and land clearance and in the past ten years, more than 2 million hectares was burnt in Southeast Asia alone. These fires last typically for 1–3 months and release large amounts of CO_{2}.

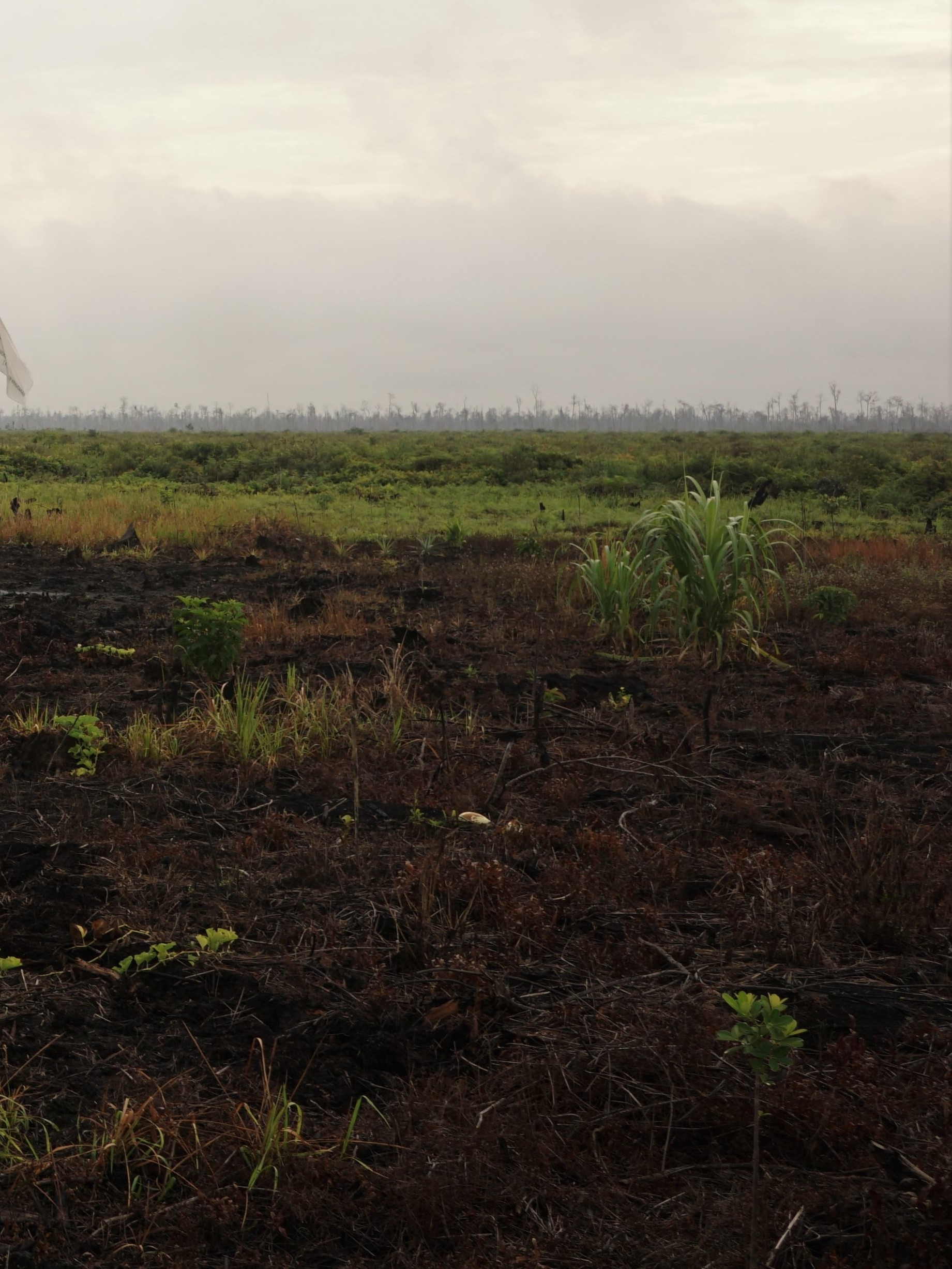
Burned peatland due to 2015 El Niño event in South Sumatra, Indonesia.

Indonesia is one of the countries suffering from peatland fires, especially during years with ENSO-related drought, an increasing problem since 1982 as a result of developing land use and agriculture. During the El Niño-event in 1997–1998 more than 24,400 km^{2} of peatland was lost to fires in Indonesia alone from which 10,000 km^{2} was burnt in Kalimantan and Sumatra. The output of CO_{2} was estimated to 0.81–2.57 Gt, equal to 13–40% of that year's global output from fossil fuel burning. Indonesia is now considered the third-biggest contributor to global CO_{2} emissions, caused primarily by these fires. The 2015 El Niño event further exacerbated the condition of these peatlands, as wildfires burned approximately 3 million hectares of forests and peatlands on the east coast of Sumatra and in Central Kalimantan, emitting 11.3 Tg CO_{2} per day during the months of September and October that year.

With a warming climate, these burnings are expected to increase in intensity and number. This is a result of a dry climate together with an extensive rice farming project, called the Mega Rice Project, started in the 1990s, which converted 1 Mha of peatlands to rice paddies. Forest and land was cleared by burning and 4000 km of channels drained the area. Drought and acidification of the lands led to bad harvest and the project was abandoned in 1999. Similar projects in China have led to immense loss of tropical marshes and fens due to rice production.

Drainage, which also increases the risk of burning, can cause additional emissions of CO_{2} by 30–100 t/ha/year if the water table is lowered by only 1 m. The draining of peatlands is likely the most important and long-lasting threat to peatlands globally, but is especially prevalent in the tropics.

Peatlands release the greenhouse gas methane which has strong global warming potential. However, subtropical wetlands have shown high CO_{2} binding per mol of released methane, which is a function that counteracts global warming. Tropical peatlands are suggested to contain about 100 Gt carbon, corresponding to more than 50% of the carbon present as CO_{2} in the atmosphere. Accumulation rates of carbon during the last millennium were close to 40 g C/m^{2}/yr.

== Northern peatlands ==
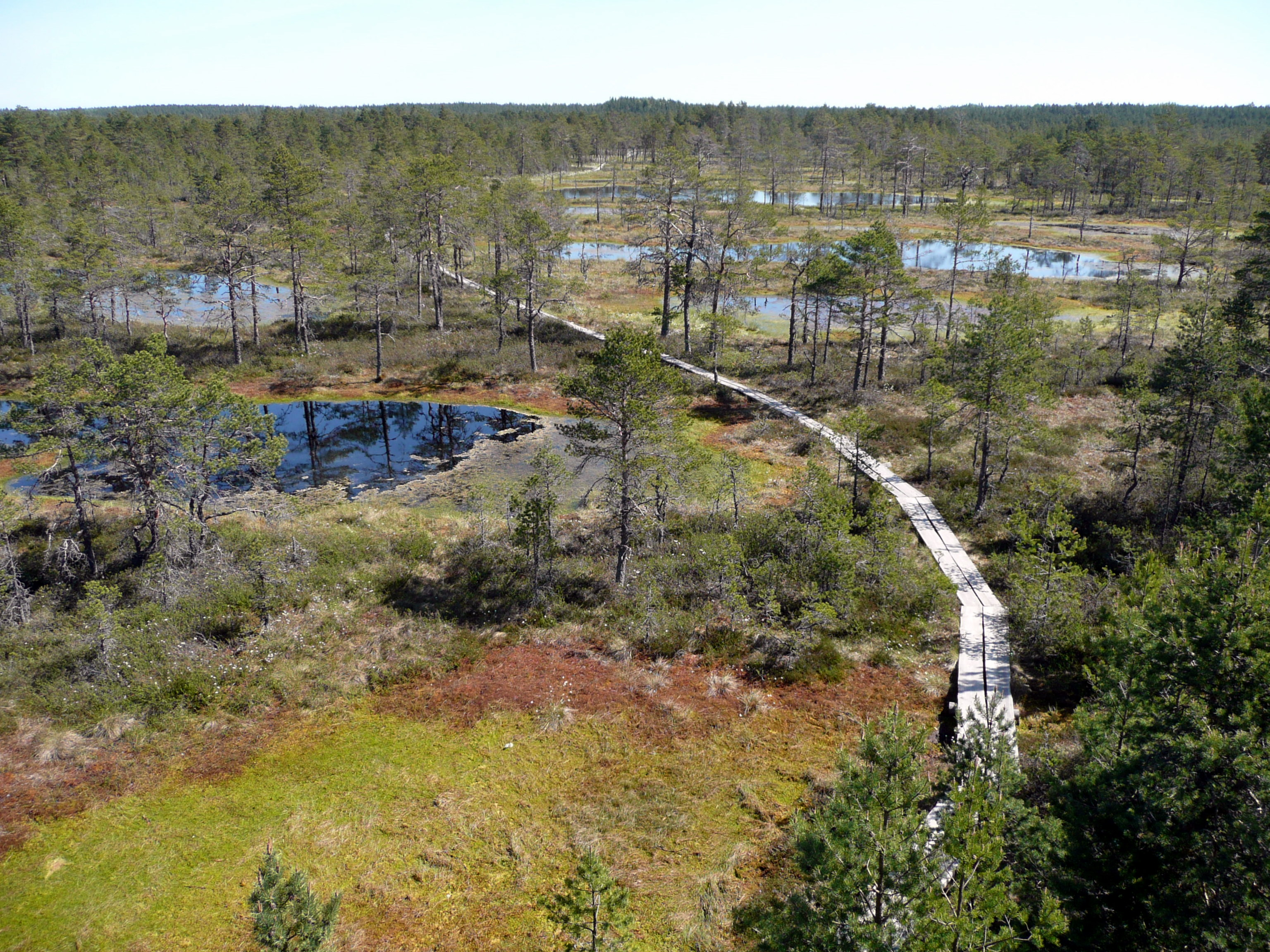
Wooded bog in Lahemaa National Park, Estonia. 65% of mires in Estonia have been strongly affected or damaged by human activity in recent years.

Northern peatlands are associated with boreal and subarctic climates. Northern peatlands were mostly built up during the Holocene after the retreat of Pleistocene glaciers, but in contrast tropical peatlands are much older. Total northern peat carbon stocks are estimated to be 1055 Gt C.

Of all northern circumpolar countries, Russia has the largest area of peatlands, and contains the largest peatland in the world, The Great Vasyugan Mire. Nakaikemi Wetland in southwest Honshu, Japan is more than 50,000 years old and has a depth of 45 m. The Philippi Peatland in Greece has probably one of the deepest peat layers with a depth of 190 m.

== Impacts on global climate ==
According to the IPCC Sixth Assessment Report, the conservation and restoration of wetlands and peatlands has large economic potential to mitigate greenhouse gas emissions, providing benefits for adaptation, mitigation and biodiversity.

Wetlands provide an environment where organic carbon is stored in living plants, dead plants and peat, as well as converted to carbon dioxide and methane. Three main factors give wetlands the ability to sequester and store carbon: high biological productivity, high water table and low decomposition rates. Suitable meteorological and hydrological conditions are necessary to provide an abundant water source for the wetland. Fully water-saturated wetland soils allow anaerobic conditions to manifest, storing carbon but releasing methane.

Wetlands make up about 5-8% of Earth's land surface, but contain about 20-30% of the planet's 2500 Gt soil carbon stores. Peatlands contain the highest amounts of soil organic carbon of all wetland types. Wetlands can become sources of carbon, rather than sinks, as the decomposition occurring within the ecosystem emits methane. Natural peatlands do not always have a measurable cooling effect on the climate in a short time span as the cooling effects of sequestering carbon are offset by the emission of methane, which is a strong greenhouse gas. However, given the short "lifetime" of methane (12 years), it is often said that methane emissions are unimportant within 300 years compared to carbon sequestration in wetlands. Within that time frame or less, most wetlands become both net carbon and radiative sinks. Hence, peatlands do result in cooling of the Earth's climate over a longer time period as methane is oxidised quickly and removed from the atmosphere whereas atmospheric carbon dioxide is continuously absorbed. Throughout the Holocene (the past 12,000 years), peatlands have been persistent terrestrial carbon sinks and have had a net cooling effect, sequestering 5.6–38 g C/m^{2} per year. On average, it has been estimated that today northern peatlands sequester 20–30 g C/m^{2}/year.

Peatlands insulate the permafrost in subarctic regions, thus delaying thawing during summer, as well as inducing the formation of permafrost. As the global climate continues to warm, wetlands could become major carbon sources as higher temperatures cause higher carbon dioxide emissions.

Compared with untilled cropland, wetlands can sequester around two times the carbon. Carbon sequestration can occur in constructed wetlands as well as natural ones. Estimates of greenhouse gas fluxes from wetlands indicate that natural wetlands have lower fluxes, but man-made wetlands have a greater carbon sequestration capacity. The carbon sequestration abilities of wetlands can be improved through restoration and protection strategies, but it takes several decades for these restored ecosystems to become comparable in carbon storage to peatlands and other forms of natural wetlands.

=== Drainage for agriculture and forestry ===
The exchange of carbon between the peatlands and the atmosphere has been of current concern globally in the field of ecology and biogeochemical studies. The drainage of peatlands for agriculture and forestry has resulted in the emission of extensive greenhouse gases into the atmosphere, most notably carbon dioxide and methane. By allowing oxygen to enter the peat column within a mire, drainage disrupts the balance between peat accumulation and decomposition, and the subsequent oxidative degradation results in the release of carbon into the atmosphere. As such, drainage of mires for agriculture transforms them from net carbon sinks to net carbon emitters. Although the emission of methane from mires has been observed to decrease following drainage, the total magnitude of emissions from peatland drainage is often greater as rates of peat accumulation are low. Peatland carbon has been described as "irrecoverable" meaning that, if lost due to drainage, it could not be recovered within time scales relevant to climate mitigation.

When undertaken in such a way that preserves the hydrological state of a mire, the anthropogenic use of mires' resources can avoid significant greenhouse gas emissions. However, continued drainage will result in increased release of carbon, contributing to global warming. As of 2016, it was estimated that drained peatlands account for around 10% of all greenhouse gas emissions from agriculture and forestry.

==== Palm oil plantations ====
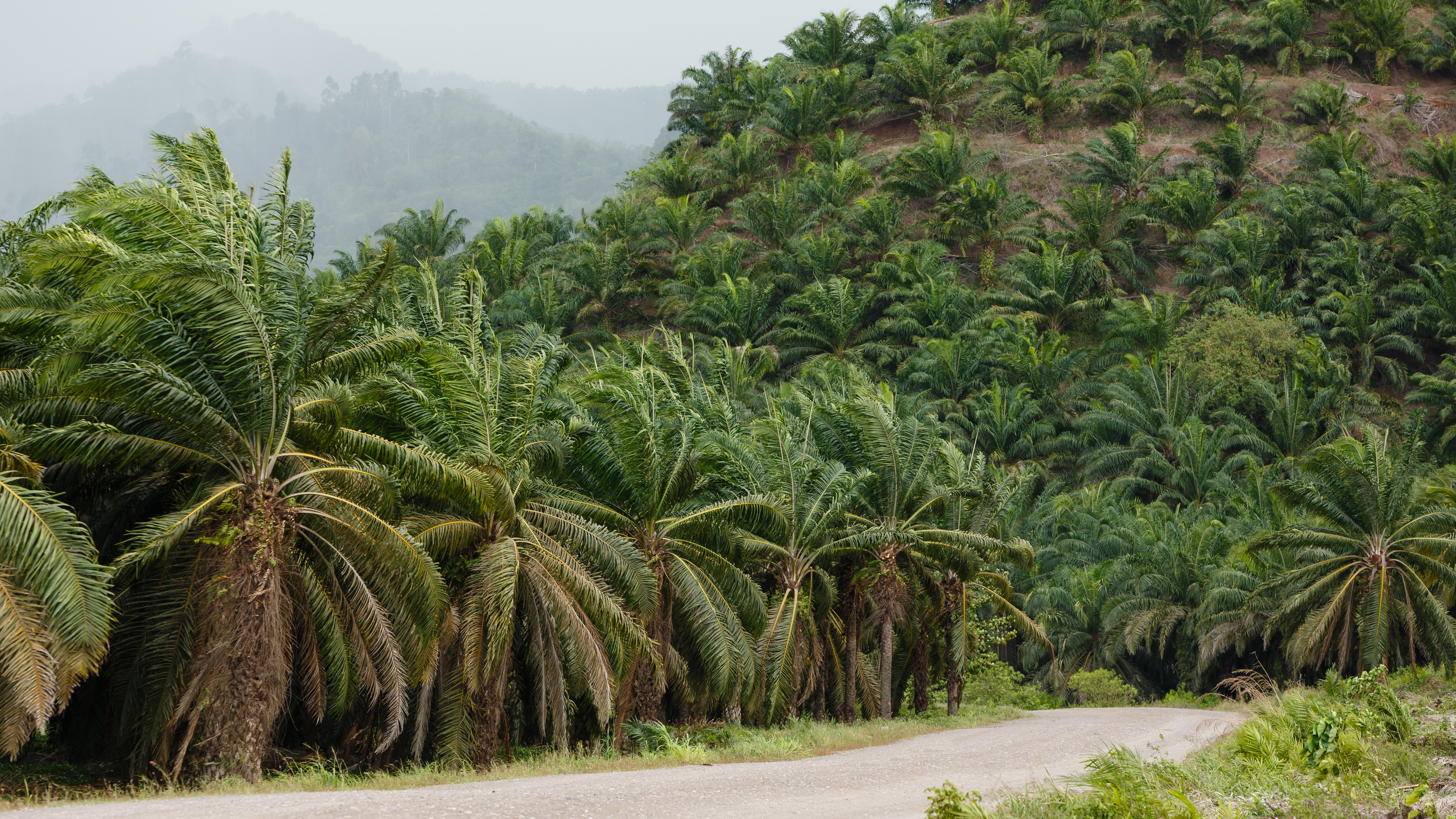
Palm oil plantation in Kunak, Malaysia. Peatlands in South East Asia are being converted to palm oil plantation, releasing as much as 76.6 tonnes of CO_{2} per hectare.

Palm oil has increasingly become one of the world's largest crops. In comparison to alternatives, palm oil is considered to be among the most efficient sources of vegetable oil and biofuel, requiring only 0.26 hectares of land to produce 1 ton of oil. Palm oil has therefore become a popular cash crop in many low-income countries and has provided economic opportunities for communities. With palm oil as a leading export in countries such as Indonesia and Malaysia, many smallholders have found economic success in palm oil plantations. However, the land selected for plantations are typically substantial carbon stores that promote biodiverse ecosystems.

Palm oil plantations have replaced much of the forested peatlands in Southeast Asia. Estimates now state that 12.9 Mha or about 47% of peatlands in Southeast Asia were deforested by 2006. In their natural state, peatlands are waterlogged with high water tables making for an inefficient soil. To create viable soil for plantation, the mires in tropical regions of Indonesia and Malaysia are drained and cleared.

The peatland forests harvested for palm oil production serve as above- and below-ground carbon stores, containing at least 42,069 million metric tonnes (Mt) of soil carbon. Exploitation of this land raises many environmental concerns, namely increased greenhouse gas emissions, risk of fires and a decrease in biodiversity. Greenhouse gas emissions for palm oil planted on peatlands is estimated to be between the equivalent of 12.4 (best case) to 76.6 t CO_{2}/ha (worst case). Tropical peatland converted to palm oil plantation can remain a net source of carbon to the atmosphere after 12 years.

In their natural state, peatlands are resistant to fire. Drainage of peatlands for palm oil plantations creates a dry layer of flammable peat. As peat is carbon dense, fires occurring in compromised peatlands release extreme amounts of both carbon dioxide and toxic smoke into the air. These fires add to greenhouse gas emissions while also causing thousands of deaths every year.

Decreased biodiversity due to deforestation and drainage makes these ecosystem more vulnerable and less resilient to change. Homogenous ecosystems are at an increased risk to extreme climate conditions and are less likely to recover from fires.

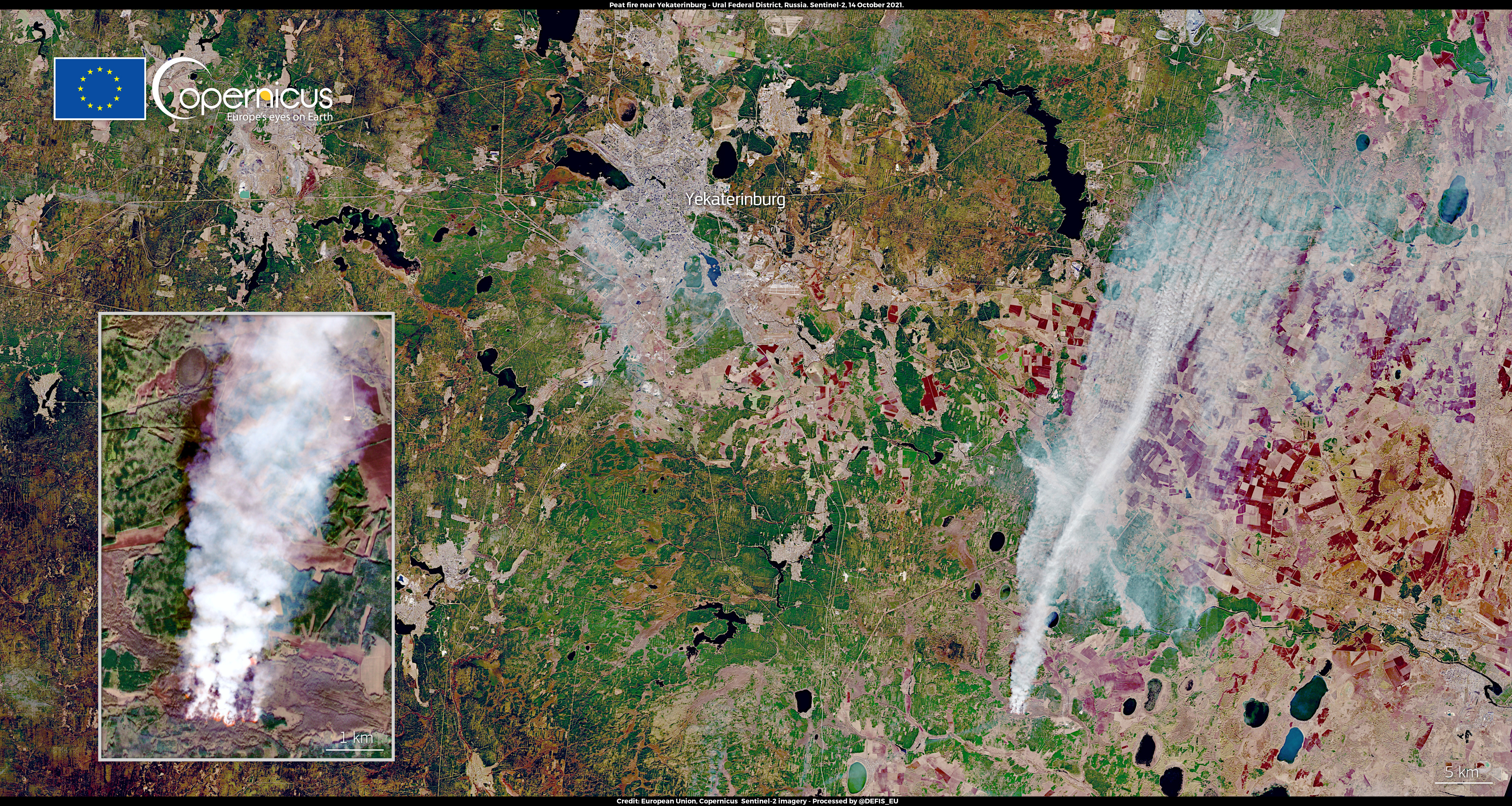
Satellite image of peat fire in Yekaterinburg, Russia, in 2021

=== Fires ===
Some peatlands are being dried out by climate change. Drainage of peatlands due to climatic factors may also increase the risk of fires, presenting further risk of carbon and methane to release into the atmosphere. Due to their naturally high moisture content, pristine mires have a generally low risk of fire ignition. The drying of this waterlogged state means that the carbon-dense vegetation becomes vulnerable to fire. In addition, due to the oxygen deficient nature of the vegetation, the peat fires can smoulder beneath the surface causing incomplete combustion of the organic matter and resulting in extreme emissions events.

In recent years, the occurrence of wildfires in peatlands has increased significantly worldwide particularly in the tropical regions. This can be attributed to a combination of drier weather and changes in land use which involve the drainage of water from the landscape. This resulting loss of biomass through combustion has led to significant emissions of greenhouse gasses both in tropical and boreal/temperate peatlands. Fire events are predicted to become more frequent with the warming and drying of the global climate.

== Management and rehabilitation ==
The United Nations Convention on Biological Diversity highlights peatlands as key ecosystems to be conserved and protected. The convention requires governments at all levels to present action plans for the conservation and management of wetland environments. Wetlands are also protected under the 1971 Ramsar Convention.

Often, restoration is done by blocking drainage channels in the peatland, and allowing natural vegetation to recover. Rehabilitation projects undertaken in North America and Europe usually focus on the rewetting of peatlands and revegetation of native species. This acts to mitigate carbon release in the short term before the new growth of vegetation provides a new source of organic litter to fuel the peat formation in the long term. UNEP is supporting peatland restoration in Indonesia.

Peat extraction is forbidden in Chile since April 2024.

=== Global Peatlands Initiative ===
The Global Peatlands Initiative is an effort made by leading experts and institutions formed in 2016 by 13 founding members at the UNFCCC COP in Marrakech, Morocco. The mission of the Initiative is to protect and conserve peatlands as the world's largest terrestrial organic carbon stock and to prevent it from being emitted into the atmosphere.

Members of the Initiative are working together within their respective areas of expertise to improve the conservation, restoration and sustainable management of peatlands. The Initiative is therefore contributing to several Sustainable Development Goals (SDGs), by keeping carbon stocks in the ground (SDG 13), by avoiding health impacts associated with serious air pollution from burning drained peatlands (SDG 3), by protecting water-related ecosystems and facilitating improved water quality (SDG 6), and by ensuring conservation of ecosystems and threatened species, protecting life on land (SDG 15).
