= Crowberry Bog =

Natural area in Jefferson County, Washington state, United States of America

Crowberry Bog Natural Area Preserve
- Location within Washington (state)
- Location: Western Washington, United States
- Coordinates: 47.8063°N 124.2009°W
- Area: 236 acres (96 ha)dnr.wa.gov
- Elevation: 135 m (443 ft)
- Established: 2016
- Governing body: Washington Department of Natural Resources
- Website: dnr.wa.gov

Crowberry Bog is an ombrotrophic raised bog on the Olympic Peninsula.
