= Fenland =

Fenland may mean:

- Fenland, or the Fens, an area of low-lying land in eastern England
  - Fenland District, a local authority district in Isle of Ely, Cambridgeshire, England, forming part of the Fens
  - Fenland Airfield, an airfield near Spalding, Lincolnshire, England, in the Fens
- Fenland or fen, a wetland habitat, composed tall grasses and sedges growing in shallow water
- Fenlands (film), a 1945 British film directed by Ken Annakin
- The Fenland Trail, a trail near the town of Banff, Alberta, Canada
