= Dernford Fen =

UK Site of Special Scientific Interest

Coordinates: 52.131°N 0.149°E

- Site of Special Scientific Interest
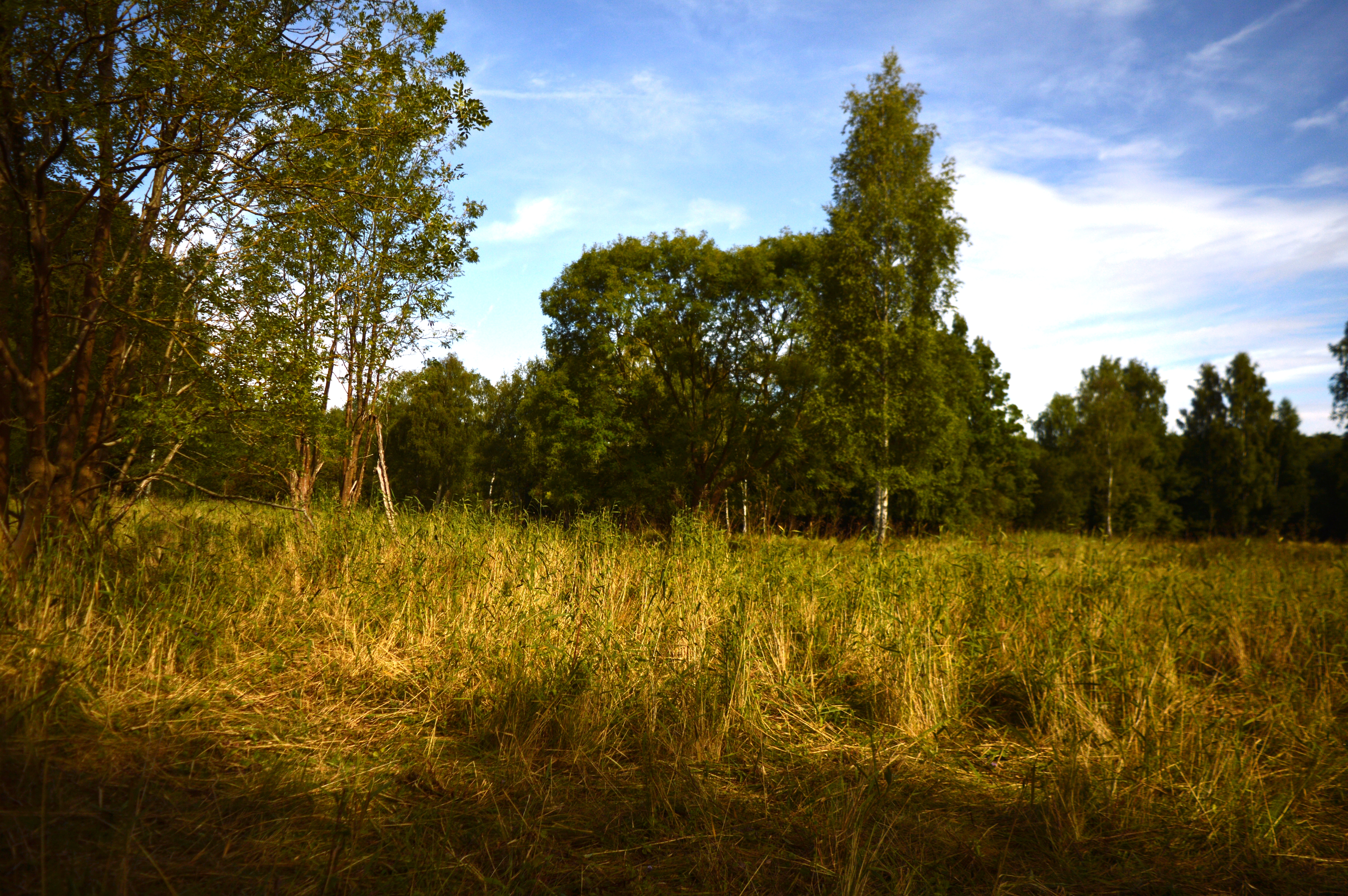
- Location of Dernford Fen.
- Area of search: Cambridgeshire
- Grid reference: TL 472 503
- Interest: Biological
- Area: 10.3 hectares
- Notification date: 1983
- Location map: Magic Map

Dernford Fen is a 10.3-hectare (25-acre) biological Site of Special Scientific Interest north-west of Sawston in Cambridgeshire.

The site is a rare surviving example of rough fen and carr. Other habitats are dry grassland and scrub, together with ditches and a chalk stream. There are breeding warblers, and the diverse habitats are valuable for amphibians and reptiles.

The site is private land with no public access.
