= Fen =

Type of wetland fed by mineral-rich ground or surface water

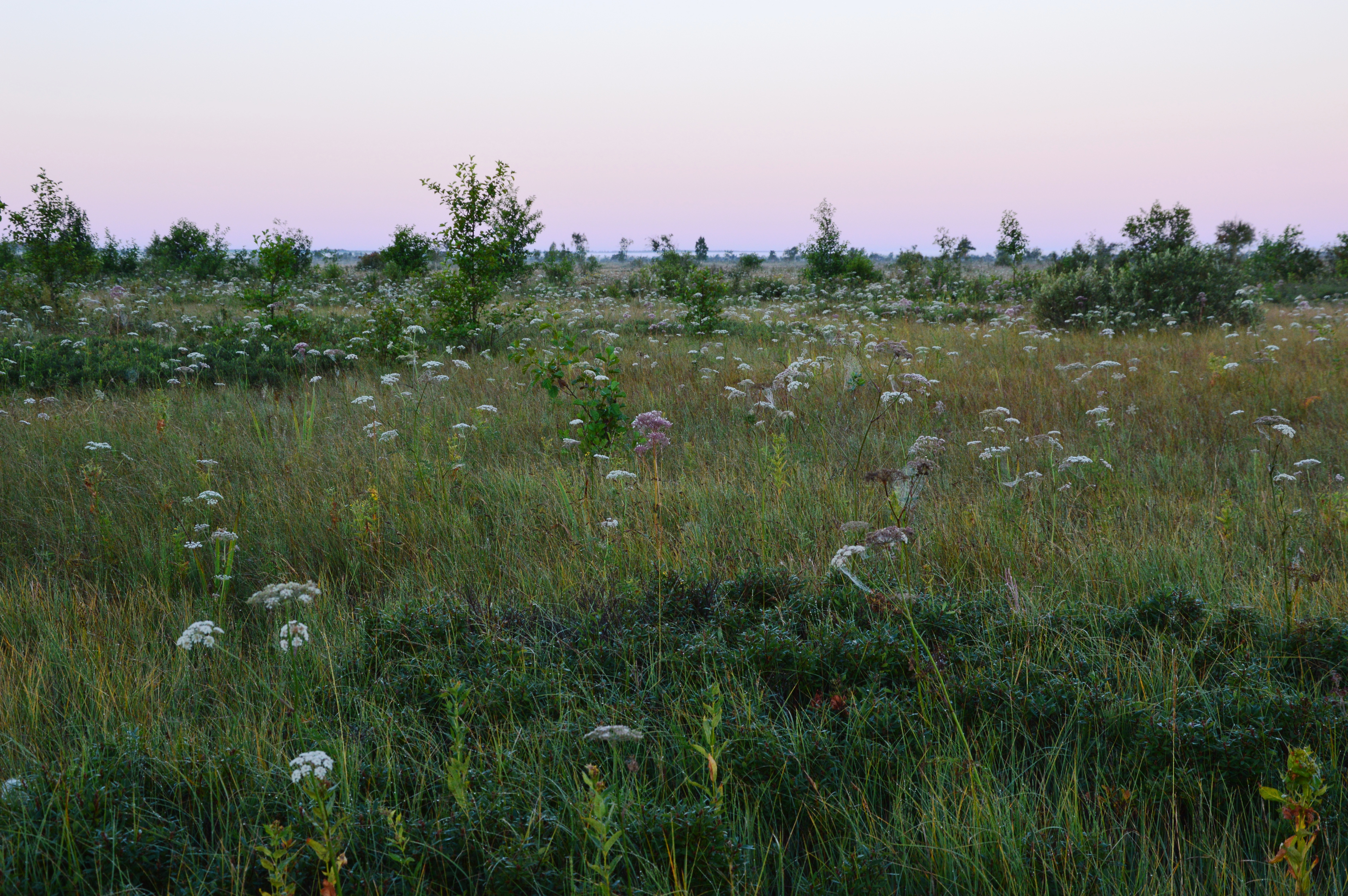
Avaste Fen, Estonia. Sedges dominate the landscape. Woody shrubs and trees are sparse.

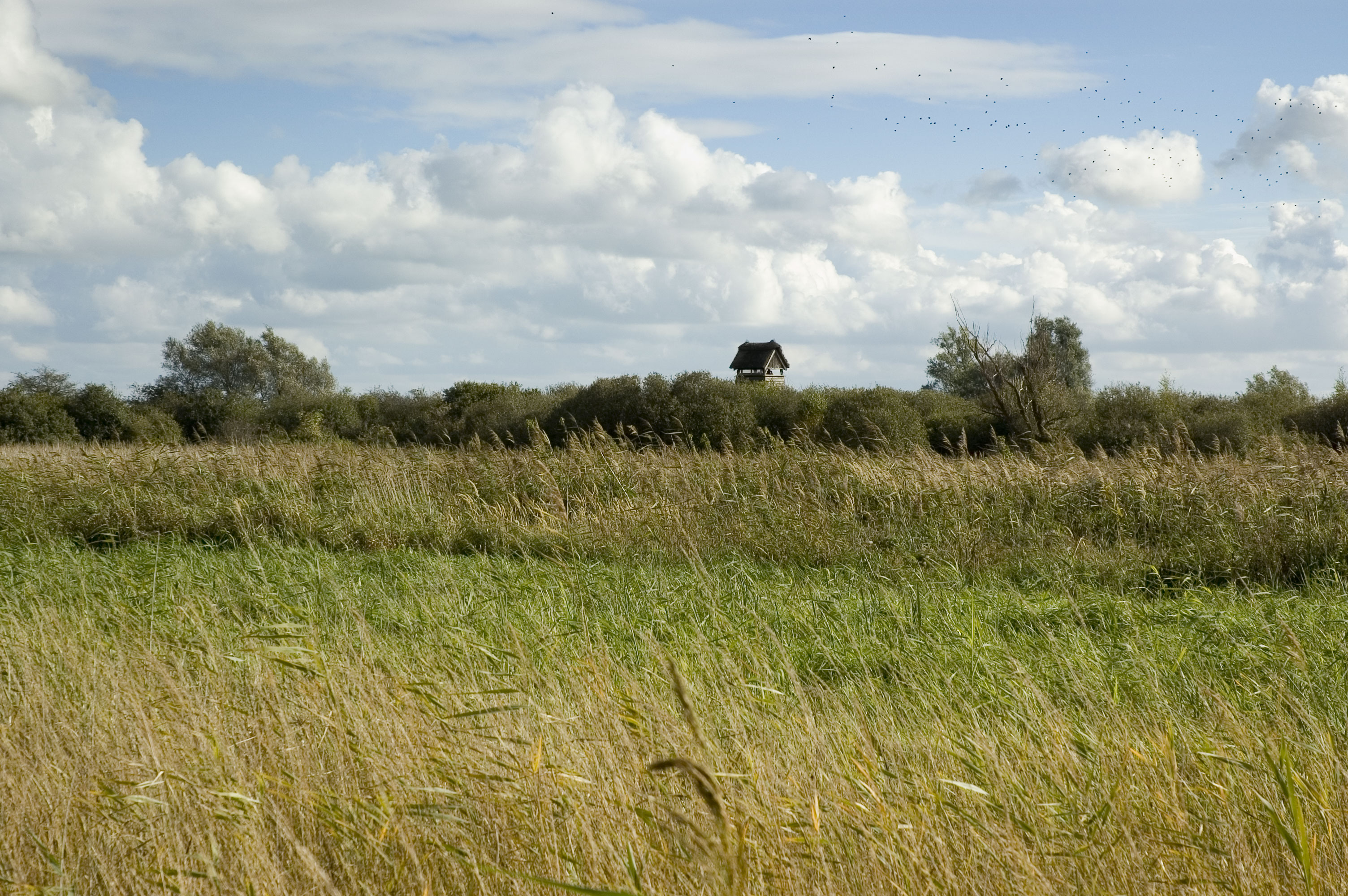
Wicken Fen, England. Grasses in the foreground are typical of a fen.

A fen is a type of peat-accumulating wetland fed by mineral-rich ground or surface water. It is one of the main types of wetland along with marshes, swamps, and bogs. Bogs and fens, both peat-forming ecosystems, are also known as mires. The unique water chemistry of fens is a result of the ground or surface water input. Typically, this input results in higher mineral concentrations and a more basic pH than found in bogs. As peat accumulates in a fen, groundwater input can be reduced or cut off, making the fen ombrotrophic rather than minerotrophic. In this way, fens can become more acidic and transition to bogs over time.

Fens can be found around the world, but the vast majority are located at the mid to high latitudes of the Northern Hemisphere. They are dominated by sedges and mosses, particularly graminoids that may be rarely found elsewhere. Fens are highly biodiverse ecosystems and often serve as habitats for endangered or rare species, with species composition changing with water chemistry. They also play important roles in the cycling of nutrients such as carbon, nitrogen, and phosphorus due to the lack of oxygen (anaerobic conditions) in waterlogged organic fen soils.

Fens have historically been converted to agricultural land. Aside from such conversion, fens face a number of other threats, including peat cutting, pollution, invasive species, and nearby disturbances that lower the water table in the fen, such as quarrying. Interrupting the flow of mineral-rich water into a fen changes the water chemistry, which can alter species richness and dry out the peat. Drier peat is more easily decomposed and can even burn. International conservation efforts were originally targeted at preserving fens as unique ecosystems that harbor significant biodiversity. These efforts have been augmented more recently by the realization that fens may provide other services to society, such as carbon sequestration and water quality enhancement.

== Etymology ==
The modern English word fen is derived from Old English fenn ("fen; marsh; mud; dirt"), itself derived from Proto-Germanic *fanja- ("swamp; marsh"), from the Proto-Indo-European root *pen- ("swamp").

== Distribution and extent ==
Fens are distributed around the world, but are most frequently found at the mid-high latitudes of the Northern Hemisphere. They are found throughout the temperate zone and boreal regions, but are also present in tundra and in specific environmental conditions in other regions around the world. In the United States, fens are most common in the Midwest and Northeast, but can be found across the country. In Canada, fens are most frequent in the lowlands near Hudson Bay and James Bay, but can also be found across the country. Fens are also spread across the northern latitudes of Eurasia, including Britain and Ireland, as well as Japan, but east-central Europe is especially rich in fens. Further south, fens are much rarer, but do exist under specific conditions. In Africa, fens have been found in the Okavango Delta in Botswana and the highland slopes in Lesotho. Fens can also be found at the colder latitudes of the Southern Hemisphere. They are found in New Zealand and southwest Argentina, but the extent is much less than that of the northern latitudes. Locally, fens are most often found at the intersection of terrestrial and aquatic ecosystems, such as the headwaters of streams and rivers.

It is estimated that there are approximately 1.1 million square kilometers of fens worldwide, but quantifying the extent of fens is difficult. Because wetland definitions vary regionally, not all countries define fens the same way. In addition, wetland data is not always available or of high quality. Fens are also difficult to rigidly delineate and measure, as they are located between terrestrial and aquatic ecosystems.

== Definition ==
Rigidly defining types of wetlands, including fens, is difficult for a number of reasons. First, wetlands are diverse and varied ecosystems that are not easily categorized according to inflexible definitions. They are often described as a transition between terrestrial and aquatic ecosystems with characteristics of both. This makes it difficult to delineate the exact extent of a wetland. Second, terms used to describe wetland types vary greatly by region. The term bayou, for example, describes a type of wetland, but its use is generally limited to the southern United States. Third, different languages use different terms to describe types of wetlands. For instance, in Russian, there is no equivalent word for the term swamp as it is typically used in North America. The result is a large number of wetland classification systems that each define wetlands and wetland types in their own way. However, many classification systems include four broad categories that most wetlands fall into: marsh, swamp, bog, and fen. While classification systems differ on the exact criteria that define a fen, there are common characteristics that describe fens generally and imprecisely. A general definition provided by the textbook Wetlands describes a fen as "a peat-accumulating wetland that receives some drainage from surrounding mineral soil and usually supports marsh like vegetation."

Three examples are presented below to illustrate more specific definitions for the term fen.

=== Canadian Wetland Classification System definition ===
In the Canadian Wetland Classification System, fens are defined by six characteristics:

1. Peat is present.
2. The surface of the wetland is level with the water table. Water flows on the surface and through the subsurface of the wetland.
3. The water table fluctuates. It may be at the surface of the wetland or a few centimeters above or below it.
4. The wetland receives a significant amount of its water from mineral-rich groundwater or surface water.
5. Decomposed sedges or brown moss peat are present.
6. The vegetation is predominantly graminoids and shrubs.

=== Wetland Ecology: Principles and Conservation (Keddy) definition ===
The textbook Wetland Ecology: Principles and Conservation offers a somewhat simpler definition of a fen as "a wetland that is usually dominated by sedges and grasses rooted in shallow peat, often with considerable groundwater movement, and with pH greater than 6." This definition differentiates fens from swamps and marshes by the presence of peat.

=== The Biology of Peatlands (Rydin) definition ===
In The Biology of Peatlands fens are defined by the following criteria:

1. The wetland is not flooded by lake or stream water.
2. Woody vegetation 2 meters or taller is absent or canopy cover is less than 25%.
3. The wetland is minerotrophic (it receives its nutrients from mineral-rich groundwater).

A further distinction is made between open and wooded fens, where open fens have canopy cover less than 10% and wooded fens have 10–25% canopy cover. If tall shrubs or trees dominate, the wetland is instead classified as a wooded bog or swamp forest, depending on other criteria.

== Hydrology and biogeochemistry ==
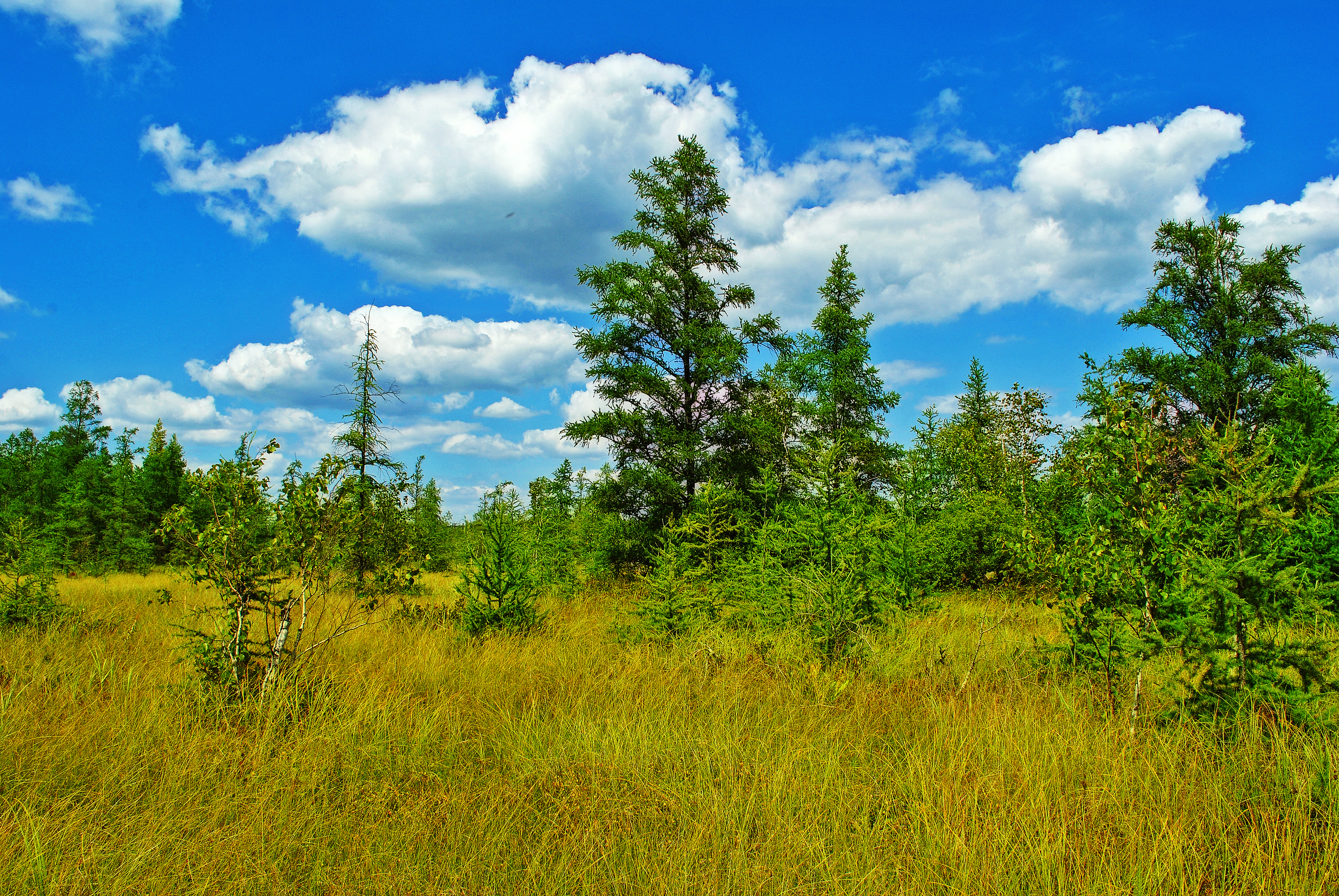
Spaulding Fen, Wisconsin

=== Hydrology ===
Hydrological conditions are a major determinant of fen biota and biogeochemistry. Fen soils are constantly inundated because the water table is at or near the surface. The result is anaerobic (oxygen-free) soils due to the slow rate at which oxygen diffuses into waterlogged soil. Anaerobic soils are ecologically unique because Earth's atmosphere is oxygenated, while most terrestrial ecosystems and surface waters are aerobic. The anaerobic conditions found in wetland soils result in reduced, rather than oxidized, soil chemistry.

A hallmark of fens is that a significant portion of their water supply is derived from groundwater (minerotrophy). Because hydrology is the dominant factor in wetlands, the chemistry of the groundwater has an enormous effect on the characteristics of the fen it supplies. Groundwater chemistry, in turn, is largely determined by the geology of the rocks that the groundwater flows through. Thus, the characteristics of a fen, especially its pH, are directly influenced by the type of rocks its groundwater supply contacts. pH is a major factor in determining fen species composition and richness, with more basic fens called "rich" and more acidic fens called "poor." Rich fens tend to be highly biodiverse and harbor a number of rare or endangered species, and biodiversity tends to decrease as the richness of fen decreases.

Fens tend to be found above rocks that are rich in calcium, such as limestone. When groundwater flows past calcareous (calcium-rich) rocks like limestone (calcium carbonate), a small amount dissolves and is carried to the fen supplied by the groundwater. When calcium carbonate dissolves, it produces bicarbonate and a calcium cation according to the following equilibrium:

$\ce{CaCO3 + H2CO3 <=> Ca^2+ + 2HCO3^-}$

where carbonic acid (H_{2}CO_{3}) is produced by the dissolution of carbon dioxide in water. In fens, the bicarbonate anion produced in this equilibrium acts as a pH buffer, which keeps the pH of the fen relatively stable. Fens supplied by groundwater that doesn't flow through minerals and act as a buffer when dissolved tend to be more acidic. The same effect is observed when groundwater flows through minerals with low solubility, such as sand.

In extreme rich fens, calcium carbonate can precipitate out of solution to form marl deposits. Calcium carbonate precipitates out of solution when the partial pressure of carbon dioxide in the solution falls. The decrease in carbon dioxide partial pressure is caused by uptake by plants for photosynthesis or direct loss to the atmosphere. This reduces the availability of carbonic acid in solution, shifting the above equilibrium back towards the formation of calcium carbonate. The result is the precipitation of calcium carbonate and the formation of marl.

=== Nutrient cycling ===
Fens share many biogeochemical characteristics with other wetlands. Like all wetlands, they play an important role in nutrient cycling because they are located at the interface of aerobic (oxic) and anaerobic (anoxic) environments. Most wetlands have a thin top layer of oxygenated soil in contact with the atmosphere or oxygenated surface waters. Nutrients and minerals may cycle between this oxidized top layer and the reduced layer below, undergoing oxidation and reduction reactions by the microbial communities adapted to each layer. Many important reactions take place in the reduced layer, including denitrification, manganese reduction, iron reduction, sulfate reduction, and methanogenesis. Because wetlands are hotspots for nutrient transformations and often serve as nutrient sinks, they may be constructed to treat nutrient-rich waters created by human activities.

Fens are also hotspots for primary production, as the continuous input of groundwater stimulates production. Bogs, which lack this input of groundwater, have much lower primary production.

==== Carbon ====
Carbon from all types of wetlands, including fens, arrives mostly as organic carbon from either adjacent upland ecosystems or by photosynthesis in the wetland itself. Once in the wetland, organic carbon generally has three main fates: oxidation to CO_{2} by aerobic respiration, burial as organic matter in peat, or decomposition to methane. In peatlands, including fens, primary production by plants is greater than decomposition, which results in the accumulation of organic matter as peat. Resident mosses usually carry out decomposition within the fen, and temperate fens are often driven by plant roots' decomposition. These peat stores sequester an enormous amount of carbon. Nevertheless, it is difficult to determine whether fens net take up or emit greenhouse gases. This is because fens emit methane, which is a more potent greenhouse gas than carbon dioxide. Methanogenic archaea that reside in the anaerobic layers of peat combine carbon dioxide and hydrogen gas to form methane and water. This methane can then escape into the atmosphere and exert its warming effects. Peatlands dominated by brown mosses and sedges such as fens have been found to emit a greater amount of methane than Sphagnum-dominated peatlands such as bogs.

==== Nitrogen ====
Fens play an important role in the global nitrogen cycle due to the anaerobic conditions found in their soils, which facilitate the oxidation or reduction of one form of nitrogen to another. Most nitrogen arrives in wetlands as nitrate from runoff, in organic matter from other areas, or by nitrogen fixation in the wetland. There are three main forms of nitrogen found in wetlands: nitrogen in organic matter, oxidized nitrogen (nitrate or nitrite), and ammonium.

Nitrogen is abundant in peat. When the organic matter in peat is decomposed in the absence of oxygen, ammonium is produced via ammonification. In the oxidized surface layer of the wetland, this ammonium is oxidized to nitrite and nitrate by nitrification. The production of ammonium in the reduced layer and its consumption in the top oxidized layer drives upward diffusion of ammonium. Likewise, nitrate production in the oxidized layer and nitrate consumption in the reduced layer by denitrification drives downward diffusion of nitrate. Denitrification in the reduced layer produces nitrogen gas and some nitrous oxide, which then exit the wetland to the atmosphere. Nitrous oxide is a potent greenhouse gas whose production is limited by nitrate and nitrite concentrations in fens.

Nitrogen, along with phosphorus, controls how fertile a wetland is.

==== Phosphorus ====
Almost all of the phosphorus that arrives in a wetland does so through sediments or plant litter from other ecosystems. Along with nitrogen, phosphorus limits wetland fertility. Under basic conditions like those found in extremely rich fens, calcium will bind to phosphate anions to make calcium phosphates, which are unavailable for uptake by plants. Mosses also play a considerable role in aiding plants in phosphorus uptake by decreasing soil phosphorus stress and stimulating phosphatase activity in organisms found below the moss cover. Helophytes have been shown to bolster phosphorus cycling within fens, especially in fen reestablishment, due to their ability to act as a phosphorus sink, which prevents residual phosphorus in the fen from being transferred away from the it. Under normal conditions, phosphorus is held within soil as dissolved inorganic phosphorus, or phosphate, which leaves trace amounts of phosphorus in the rest of the ecosystem.

Iron is important in phosphorus cycling within fens. Iron can bind to high levels of inorganic phosphate within the fen, leading to a toxic environment and inhibition of plant growth. In iron-rich fens, the area can become vulnerable to acidification, excess nitrogen and potassium, and low water levels. Peat soils play a role in preventing the bonding of irons to phosphate by providing high levels of organic anions for iron to bind to instead of inorganic anions such as phosphate.

=== Bog–rich-fen gradient ===
Bogs and fens can be thought of as two ecosystems on a gradient from poor to rich, with bogs at the poor end, extremely rich fens at the rich end, and poor fens in between. In this context, "rich" and "poor" refer to the species richness, or how biodiverse a fen or bog is. The richness of these species is strongly influenced by pH and concentrations of calcium and bicarbonate. These factors assist in identifying where along the gradient a particular fen falls. In general, rich fens are minerotrophic, or dependent on mineral-rich groundwater, while bogs are ombrotrophic, or dependent on precipitation for water and nutrients. Poor fens fall between these two.

==== Rich fens ====
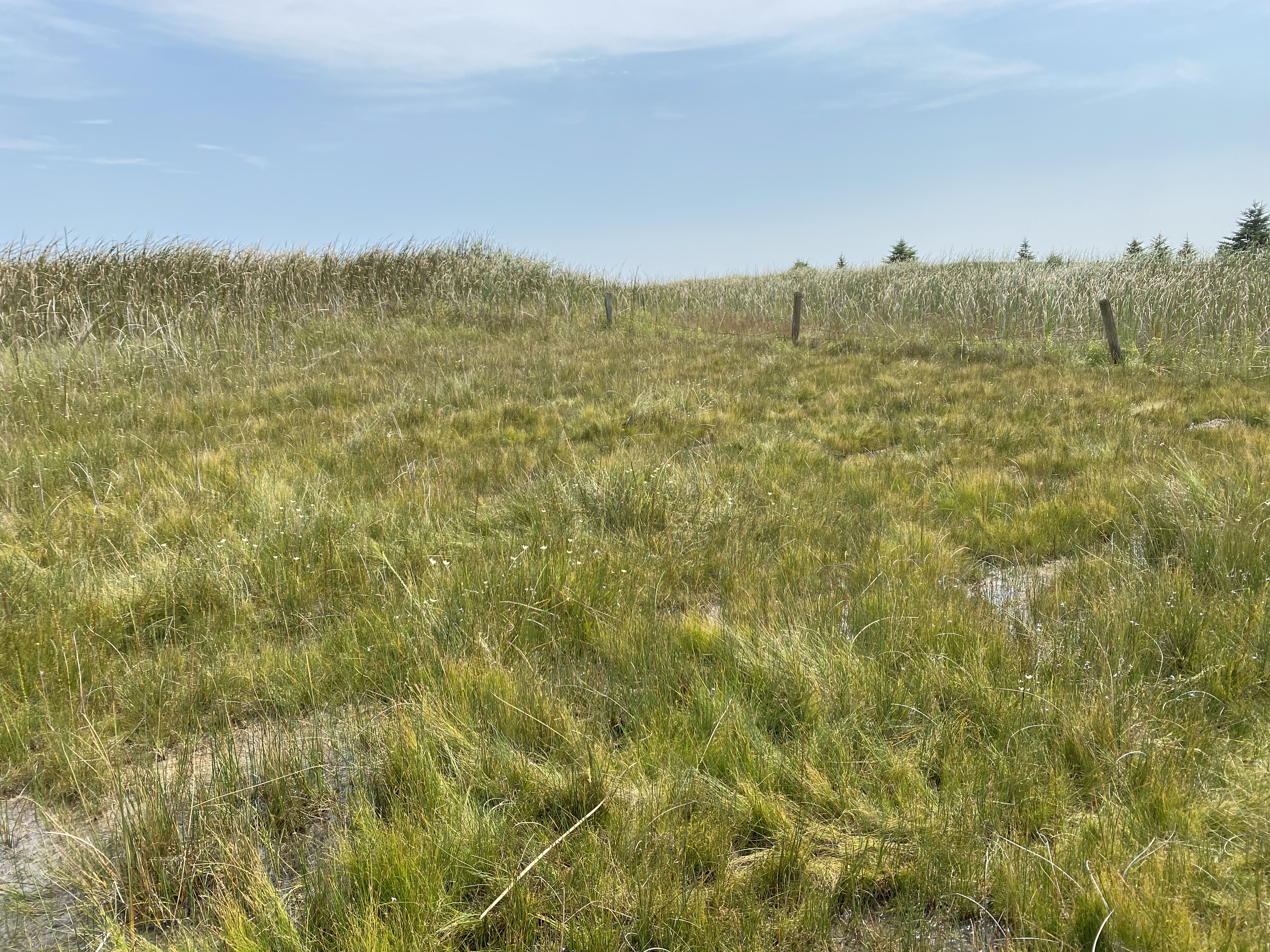
Small extreme rich fen in southwestern Minnesota. The white flowers, Parnassia glauca, are a fen indicator species in Minnesota.

Rich fens are strongly minerotrophic; that is, a large proportion of their water comes from mineral-rich ground or surface water. Fens that are more distant from surface waters such as rivers and lakes, however, are more rich than fens that are connected. This water is dominated by calcium and bicarbonate, resulting in a slightly acidic to slightly basic pH characteristic of rich fens. These conditions promote high biodiversity. Within rich fens, there is a large amount of variability. The richest fens are the extreme rich (marl) fens, where marl deposits are often build up. These are often pH 7 or greater. Rich and intermediate rich fens are generally neutral to slightly acidic, with a pH of approximately 7 to 5. Rich fens are not always very productive; at high calcium concentrations, calcium ions bind to phosphate anions, reducing the availability of phosphorus and decreasing primary production. Rich bogs with limited primary production can stabilize with the accumulation of mosses and mycorrhiza, which promote phosphorus cycling and can support the growth of new vegetation and bacteria. Brown mosses (family Amblystegiaceae) and sedges (genus Carex) are the dominant vegetation. However, an accumulation of mosses such as Sphagnum can lead to the acidification of the rich fen, potentially converting it into a poor fen. Compared to poor fens, rich fens have higher concentrations of bicarbonate, base cations (Na^{+}, Ca^{2+}, K^{+}, Mg^{2+}), and sulfate.

==== Poor fens ====
Poor fens are, in many ways, an intermediate between rich fens and bogs. Hydrologically, they are more similar to rich fens than to bogs, but regarding vegetation composition and chemistry, they are more similar to bogs than rich fens. They are much more acidic than their rich counterparts, with a pH of approximately 5.5 to 4. Peat in poor fens tends to be thicker than that of rich fens, which cuts off vegetation access to the mineral-rich soil underneath. In addition, the thicker peat reduces the influence of mineral-rich groundwater that buffers the pH. This makes the fen more ombrotrophic, or dependent on nutrient-poor precipitation for its water and nutrients. Poor fens may also form in areas where the groundwater supplying the fen flows through sediments that don't dissolve well or have low buffering capacity when dissolved. Species richness tends to be lower than that of rich fens but higher than that of bogs. Poor fens, like bogs, are dominated by Sphagnum mosses, which acidify the fen and decrease nutrient availability.

== Threats and conservation ==
=== Threats to fens ===
Fens face many threats to their existence. Historically, a major cause of fen loss has been conversion to agricultural lands. Where climates are suitable, fens have been drained for agricultural use alongside crop production, grazing, and hay making. Draining a fen directly is particularly damaging because it lowers the water table. A lower water table can increase aeration and dry out peat, allowing for aerobic decomposition or burning of the organic matter in peat. Draining a fen indirectly by decreasing its water supply can be just as damaging. Disrupting groundwater flow into the fen with nearby human activities such as quarrying or residential development can alter water and nutrient inputs to the fen. This can make the fen more ombrotrophic (dependent on precipitation), which results in acidification and a change in water chemistry. This directly impacts the habitat of these species, and many signature fen species disappear.

Fens are also threatened by invasive species, fragmentation, peat cutting, and pollution. Non-native invasive species, such as the common buckthorn in North America, can invade fens and outcompete rare fen species, reducing biodiversity. Invasion by non-native species or even aggressive native species can be facilitated by other threats to fens, such as drainage, pollutants, or alteration of water chemistry. Habitat fragmentation threatens fen species, especially rare or endangered species that are unable to move to nearby fens due to fragmentation. Peat cutting, while much more common in bogs, does happen in fens. Peat cut from fens has many uses, including burning as a fuel. Pollutants can alter the chemistry of fens and facilitate invasion by invasive species. Common pollutants of fens include road salts, nutrients from septic tanks, and runoff of agricultural fertilizers and pesticides.

=== Conservation of fens ===
Significant losses of fens, particularly via conversion to agricultural lands, has reduced their prevalence, especially across Europe and North America. As such, remaining fens are often highly valued by conservationists and are the subject of many conservation efforts, such as the Habitats Directive. There is also interest in restoring fens that have been damaged or degraded. Often, this is attempted by altering or restoring the hydrological conditions at a site (e.g., blocking of drains or ditches). Restoration is not always possible or successful. The particular disturbances that have degraded a particular fen may cause irreversible changes that make restoration unfeasible.

Initially, efforts to conserve fens were driven primarily by a desire to protect these unique ecosystems. However, it is increasingly recognized that fens, like other wetlands, deliver a number of services valuable to society (e.g., carbon sequestration, influencing water quality), fostering further support for fen conservation and restoration.

== Ecosystem services ==
Once commonly drained for conversion to agricultural purposes or for urban development, wetlands, including fens, are now recognized to offer society a range of services that may include:

=== Carbon sequestration and global warming ===
Fens, as peat-forming ecosystems, sequester large quantities of carbon as peat, preventing its release into the atmosphere as carbon dioxide. Destruction of the peat layer in fens can release carbon stores into the atmosphere. Preservation of existing peatlands can help prevent mobilization of their large carbon stores. It is controversial whether fens net take up or emit greenhouse gases since microbes in their anaerobic soils produce methane, a potent greenhouse gas.

=== Biodiversity ===
Fens contain a variety of plant species, including some rare species. Rich and calcareous fens in particular tend to have high biodiversity and contain rare plants. For example, calcareous fens in Minnesota may contain the small white lady's slipper, which is considered a species of special concern in the state.

=== Water quality ===
Wetlands, including fens, are known to modify the chemistry of water flowing through them, removing pollutants and nutrient excess. One major application of this is treatment of agricultural runoff rich in nitrogen. Fens accepting this agricultural runoff can discharge water containing lower levels of nitrogen and other pollutants, improving water quality in nearby aquatic environments. However, fens may be sensitive to pollutants and nutrient loading. Some fens in which plant growth was previously limited by nitrogen availability may have significantly increased primary production with a subsequent decrease in species richness.

== Images ==
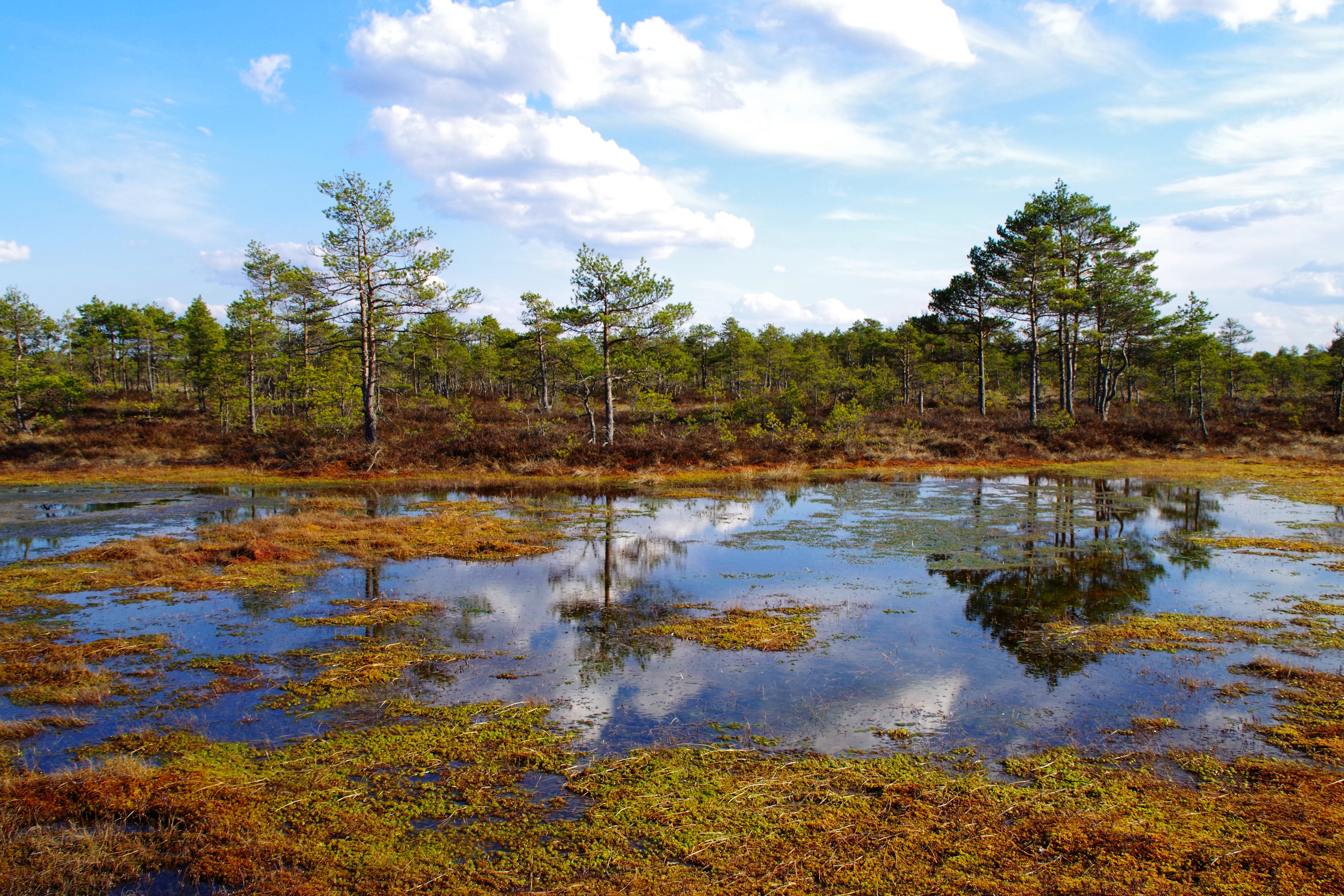
Kakerdaja Fen, Estonia

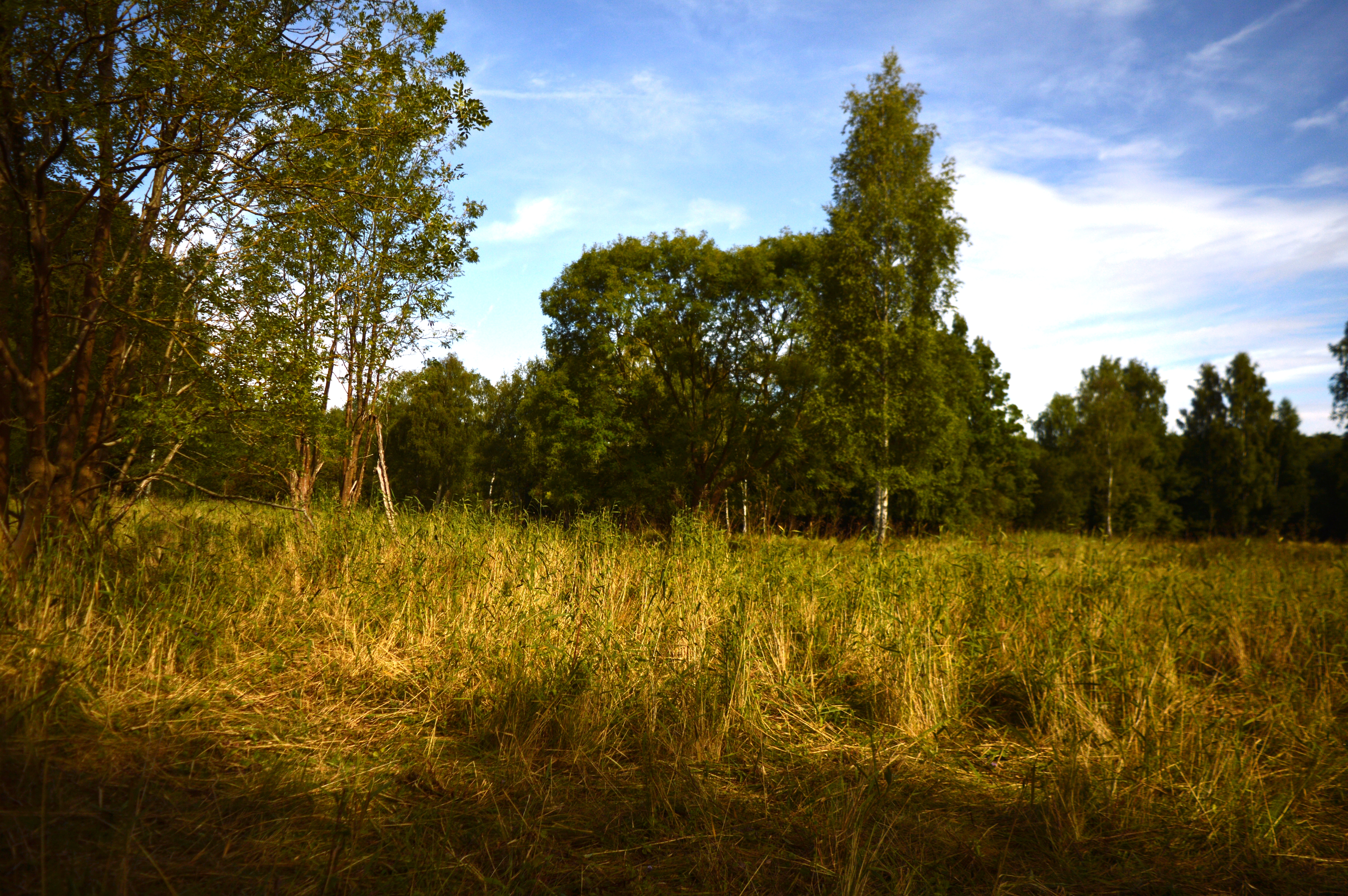
Dernford Fen, Cambridgeshire

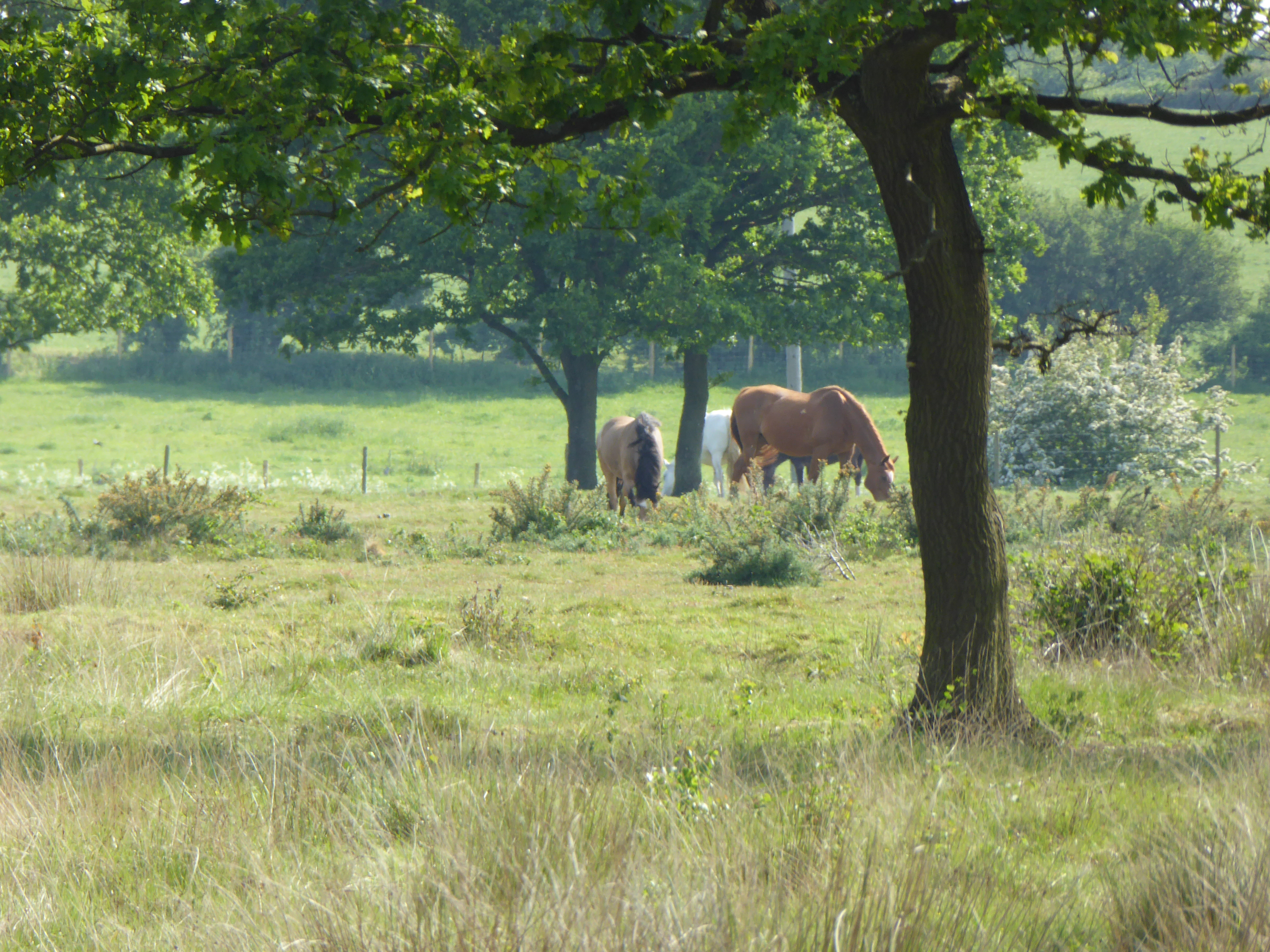
Sugar Fen, Norfolk

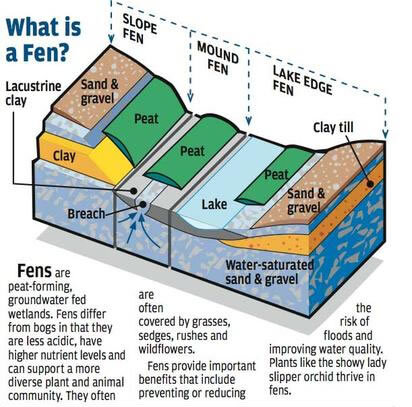

== See also ==
- Appalachian bogs
- Bayou
- Biodiversity Action Plan
- Carr
- Fen-meadow
- Fenland (disambiguation)
- List of fen plants
- Reed bed

=== Specific fenlands ===
- Back Bay Fens (Boston, Massachusetts, USA)
- Cedar Bog (Champaign County, Ohio, USA)
- Cowles Bog, Indiana Dunes National Lakeshore (Indiana, USA)
- The Fens (East Anglia & East Midlands, Britain)
  - Wicken Fen, a specific Cambridgeshire location, part of The Fens in Britain
- Geneva Creek (Colorado) (an iron fen in the USA)
- High Fens, on border of Belgium and Germany
- Mesopotamian Marshes (Southeastern Iraq & Western Iran border)
