= List of fen plants =

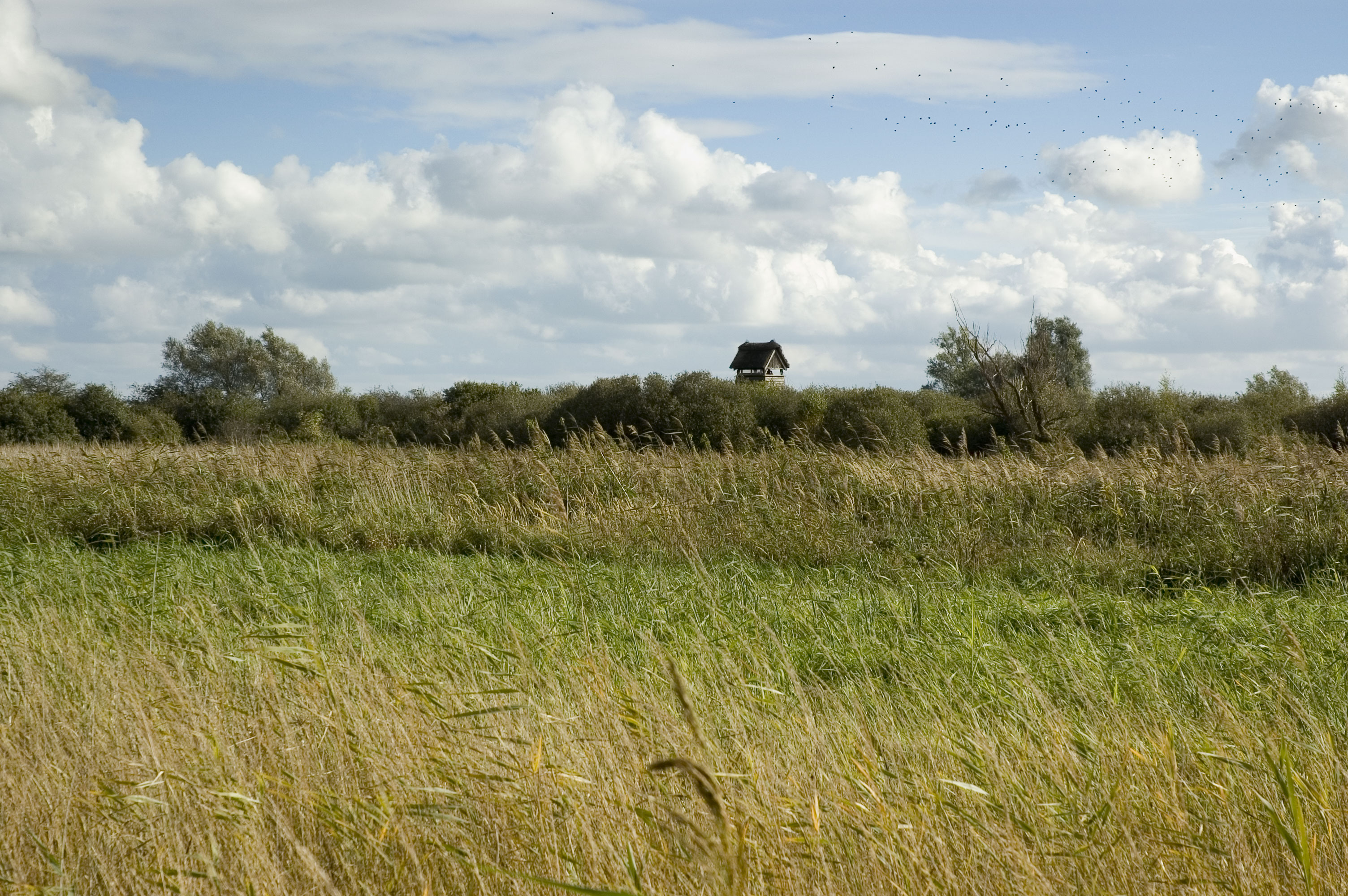
Wicken fen

The following is a list of plant species to be found in a north European fen habitat with some attempt to distinguish between reed bed relicts and the carr pioneers. However, nature does not come in neat compartments so that for example, the odd stalk of common reed will be found in carr.

== In pools ==
- Beaked sedge; Carex rostrata
- Whorl grass; Catabrosa aquatica
- Needle spike-rush; Eleocharis acicularis
- Northern spike-rush; Eleocharis austriaca
- Sweet grasses; Glyceria species
- Common reed; Phragmites australis
- Swamp meadow grass; Poa palustris

== In typical fen ==
- Flat sedge; Blysmus compressus
- Great fen sedge; Cladium mariscus
- Lesser tufted sedge; Carex acuta
- Lesser pond sedge; Carex acutiformis
- Davall's sedge; Carex davalliana
- Dioecious sedge; Carex dioica
- Brown sedge; Carex disticha
- Tufted sedge; Carex elata
- Slender sedge; Carex lasiocarpa
- Flea sedge; Carex pulicaris
- Greater pond sedge; Carex riparia
- Common spike-rush; Eleocharis palustris
- Few-flowered spike-rush; Eleocharis quinqueflora
- Slender spike-rush; Eleocharis uniglumis
- Broad-leaved cotton sedge; Eriophorum latifolium
- Reed sweet-grass; Glyceria maxima
- Yellow flag iris; Iris pseudacorus
- Brown bog [sic] rush; Schoenus ferrugineus

== In fen carr ==
- Narrow small-reed; Calamagrostis stricta
- Purple small-reed; Calamagrostis canescens
- Tussock sedge; Carex paniculata
- Cyperus sedge; Carex pseudocyperus
- Wood club rush; Scirpus sylvaticus
