= Avaste Nature Reserve =

Protected area in Estonia

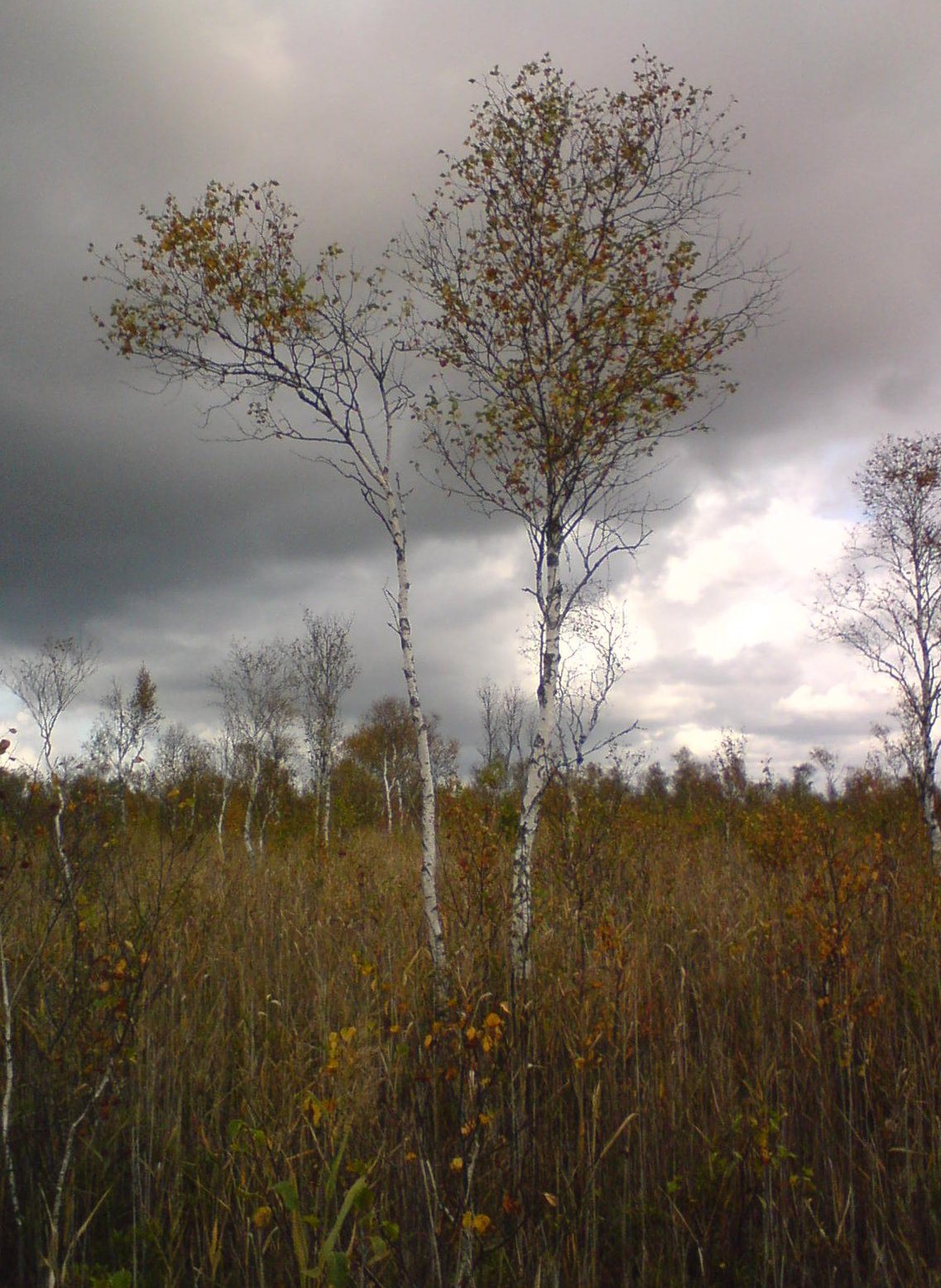

- Location within Estonia
- Location: Estonia
- Nearest city: Pärnu
- Coordinates: 58°41′06″N 24°10′02″E
- Area: 5,226 ha (12,910 acres)

Avaste Nature Reserve is a nature reserve situated in western Estonia, to largest extent in Pärnu County.

Avaste nature reserve consists of forests, fens, bogs and meadows. It is centred on Avaste fen, one of the largest fens in Estonia. The flora of the nature reserve includes sweet gale, mud sedge and several species of orchid. Several species of rare or threatened birds furthermore have a habitat in the nature reserve. These include black stork, white-backed woodpecker, Eurasian goshawk, short-eared owl, three species of eagle and others.

A 2.6 km (1.6 mi) long hiking trail runs adjacent to the nature reserve.

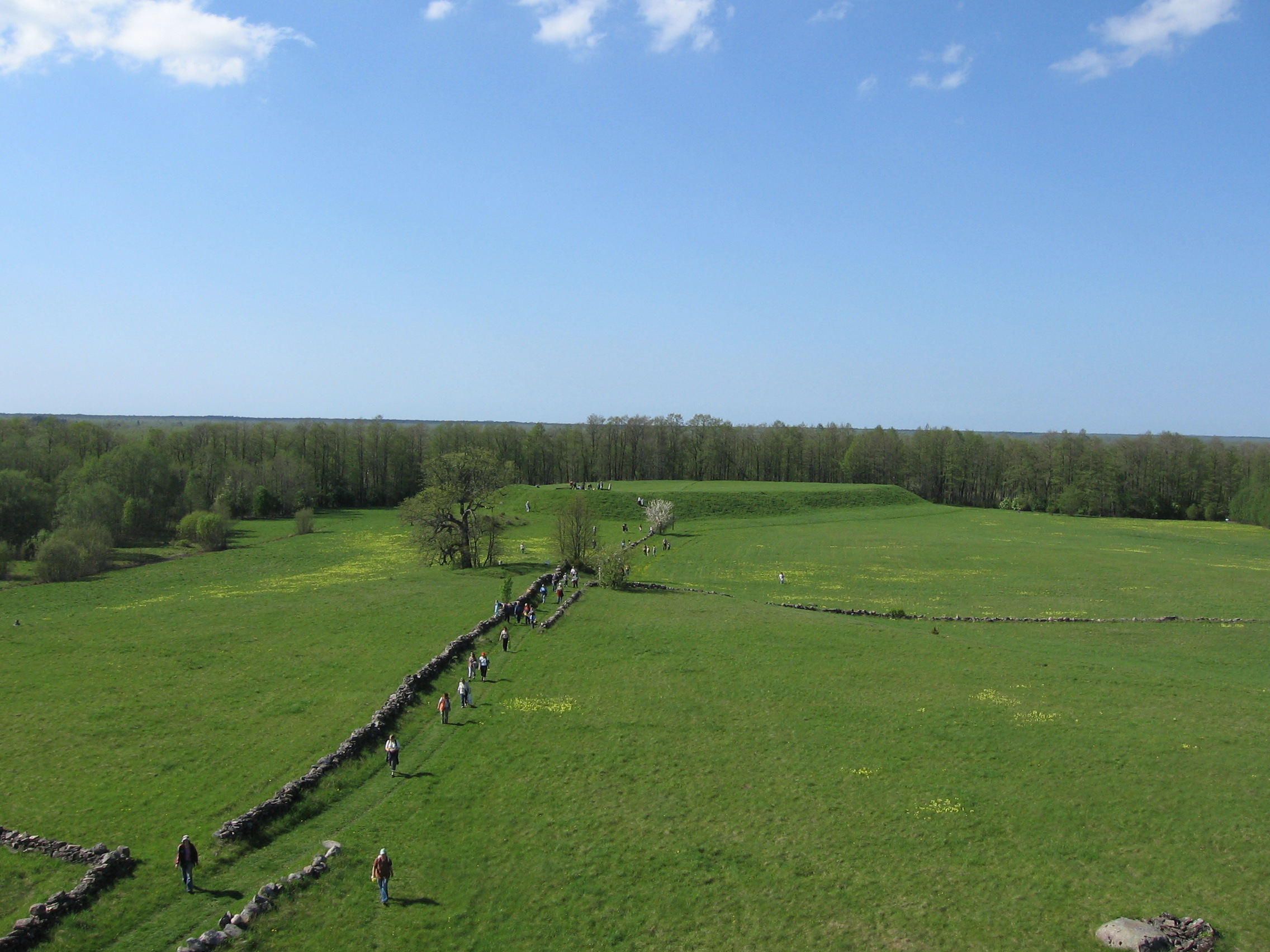
Soontagana hill fort

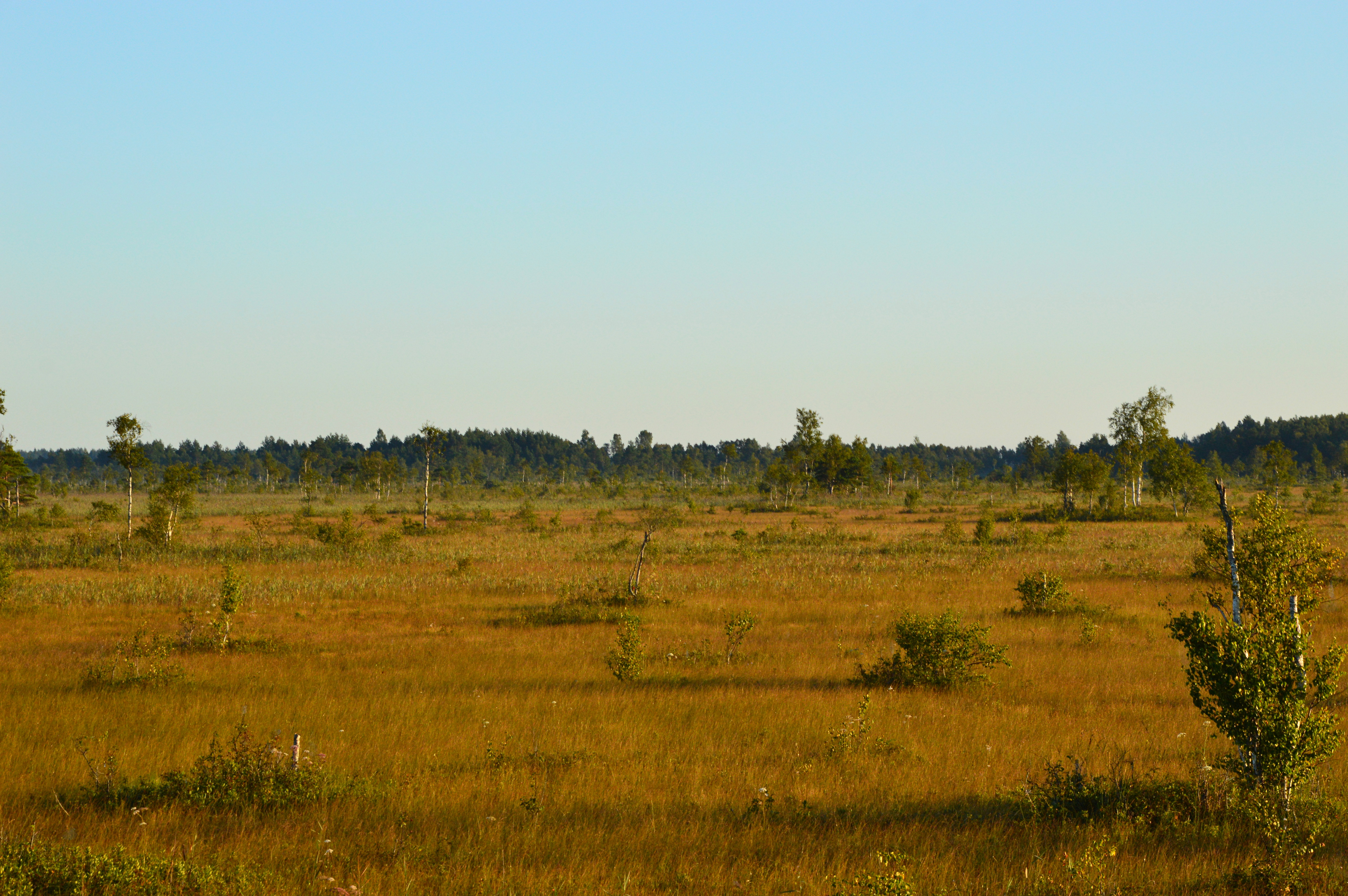
Avaste Fen

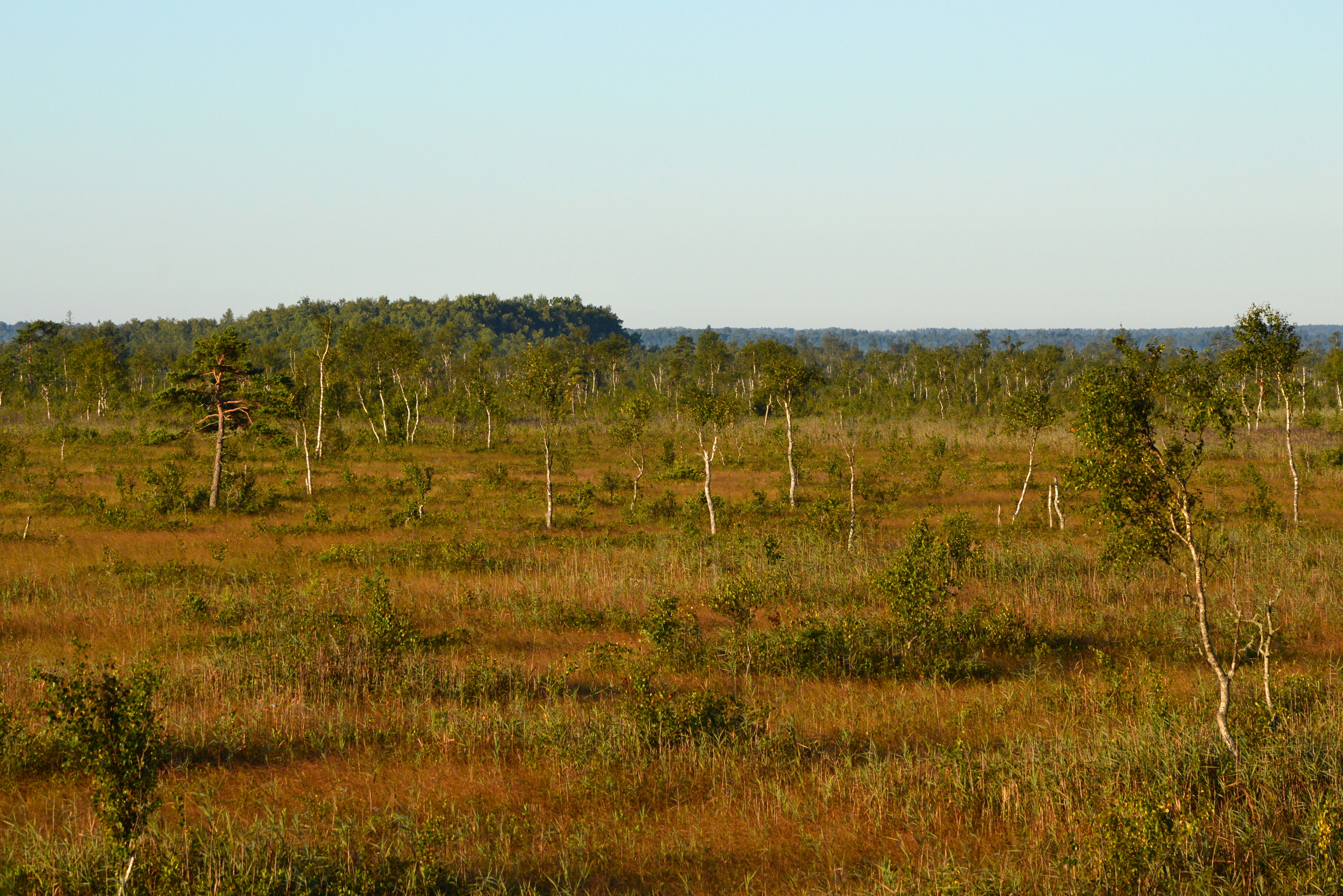
Avaste Fen

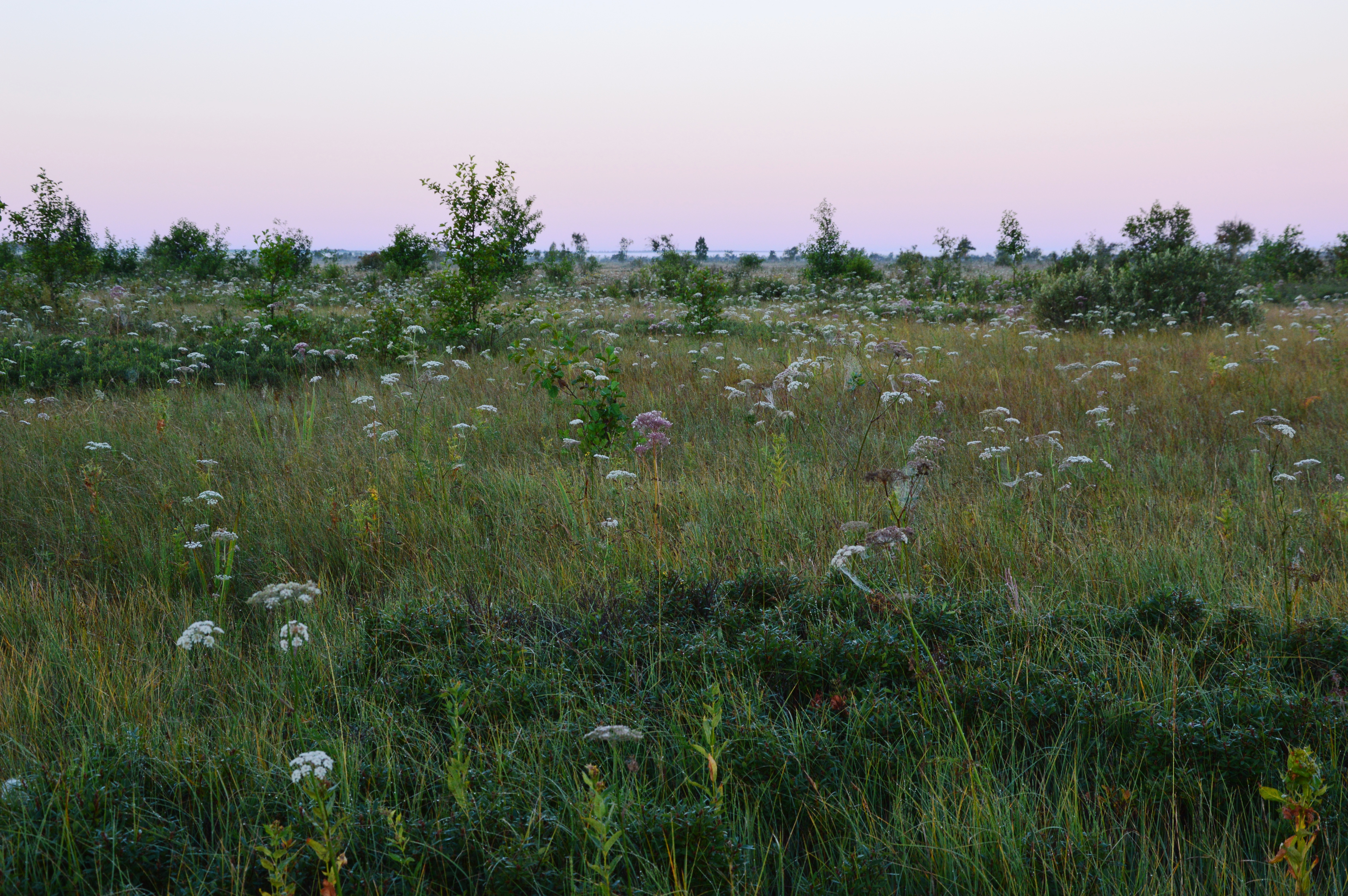
Outer part of Avaste Fen

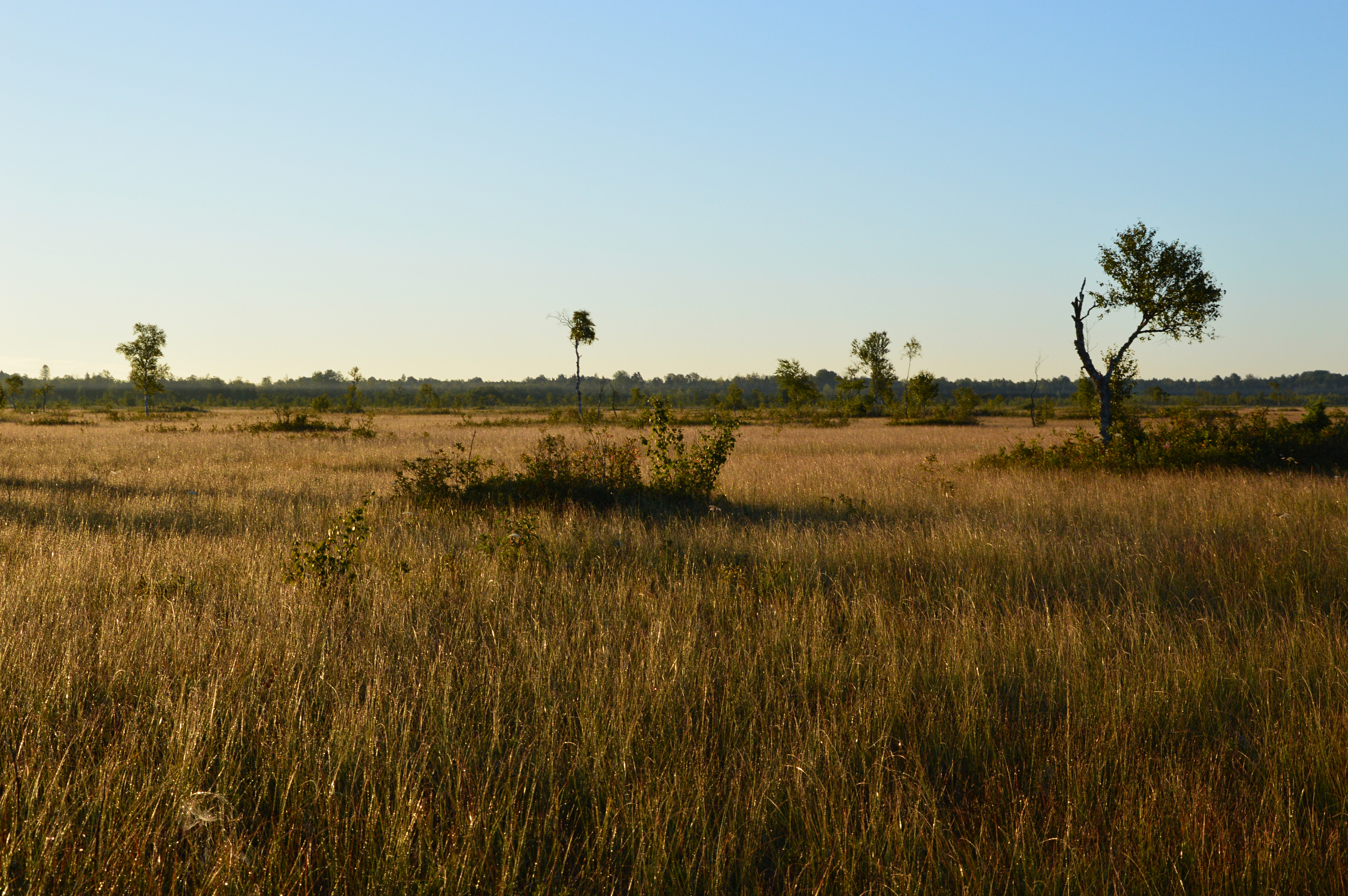
Fen during sunrise
