= Ombrotrophic =

Low-nutrient environment supplied with water and nutrients solely by rainfall

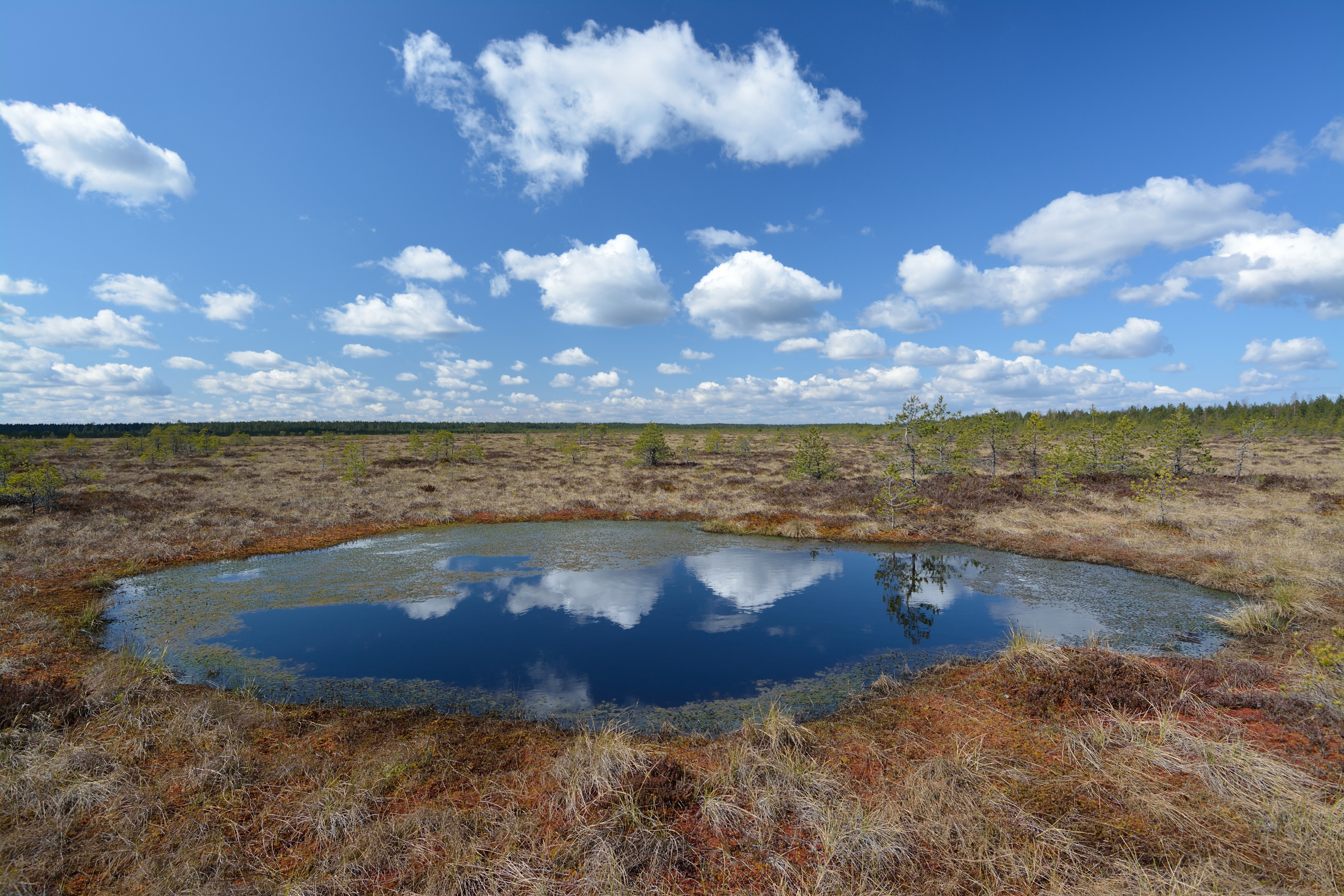
Precipitation accumulates in many bogs, forming bog pools.

Ombrotrophic ('cloud-fed'), from Ancient Greek ὄμβρος (ómbros) meaning 'rain' and τροφή (trofē) meaning 'food', refers to soils or vegetation which receive all of their water and nutrients from precipitation, rather than from streams or springs. Such environments are hydrologically isolated from the surrounding landscape, and since rain is acidic and very low in nutrients, they are home to organisms tolerant of acidic, low-nutrient environments. The vegetation of ombrotrophic peatlands is often bog, dominated by Sphagnum mosses. The hydrology of these environments are directly related to their climate, as precipitation is the water and nutrient source, and temperatures dictate how quickly water evaporates from these systems.

Ombrotrophic circumstances may occur even in landscapes composed of limestone or other nutrient-rich substrates – for example, in high-rainfall areas, limestone boulders may be capped by acidic ombrotrophic bog vegetation. Epiphytic vegetation (plants growing on other plants) is ombrotrophic.

In contrast to ombrotrophic environments, minerotrophic environments are those where the water supply comes mainly from streams or springs. This water has flowed over or through rocks often acquiring dissolved chemicals which raise the nutrient levels and reduce the acidity, which leads to different vegetation such as fen or poor fen.

In most cases, ombrotrophic bogs are extremely nutrient deficient, relying solely on precipitation and atmospheric dust for nutrient supply. This deficiency is a key characteristic of these ecosystems. However, while ombrotrophic peat decomposes slowly, some nutrient release does occur. For example, microelements like zinc, copper, and manganese are easily mobilized. Additionally, the presence of more nutrient-demanding species in drainage channels draining ombrotrophic bog areas suggests nutrient removal from these ecosystems.

Vegetation in ombrotrophic bogs is adapted to survive in nutrient-poor conditions, with Sphagnum mosses playing a critical role in its nutrient cycle and retention. The addition of extra nutrients and its effects on vegetation and the carbon cycle can impact an ombrotrophic bog. Increased atmospheric nitrogen deposition is a major concern in northern ecosystems, which are typically nutrient-limited. Some studies suggest that nitrogen deposition may increase ecosystems' carbon dioxide sink potential by stimulating plant productivity. High nitrogen deposition levels in Europe have led to changes in plant species composition in peatlands and tundra, with documented increases in vascular plant biomass and decreases in moss abundance, particularly the genus Sphagnum. This moss is critical in bogs for its ability to absorb and retain moisture and nutrients from the atmosphere, and to retard vascular plant growth, thus contributing to carbon sequestration. Atmospheric nitrogen deposition in North America is lower than in Europe. Studies in boreal peatlands in Canada have reported a positive correlation between wet nitrogen deposition and carbon accumulation, but it is unclear whether this pattern would continue under higher deposition levels. With a warmer and drier climate, without the effect of nitrogen deposition, bog communities in Canada are likely to shift and could become weaker carbon sinks or even carbon sources.

Ombrotrophic bogs have also been assessed for their uses as archives of atmospheric mercury deposition. This involves studying the solid state distributions of mercury and other metals in the bog to understand post-depositional transport processes and the immobility of deposited trace metals. It was found that mercury and lead are immobile in ombrotrophic peat, indicating that their distribution can be used to determine temporal changes in deposition and suggesting that ombrotrophic bogs can serve as reliable records of historic atmospheric mercury deposition. Historic atmospheric mercury deposition in Arlberg Bog, Minnesota, increased gradually after the mid-1800s, peaked between 1950 and 1960, and may have declined thereafter. Preindustrial deposition levels were estimated to be about 4 μg/m^{2} per year, while recent deposition levels were approximately 19 μg/m^{2} per year. The deposition of mercury in Arlberg Bog appeared to have been influenced by both regional and/or local-scale sources, highlighting the complex nature of atmospheric deposition patterns and the need to consider multiple factors when studying metal deposition in ombrotrophic bogs.

Despite their significance as sources of fuel and horticultural peat moss, there is still much to uncover about the ecological and biogeochemical processes of ombrotrophic bogs. Chemical analyses of peat profiles could shed light on this aspect, but the data collected so far have not been adequate for such analysis. One of the main challenges is the infrequent sample intervals and the lack of chemical data on surface peat or sufficient information on habitat conditions. Although some nutrient release occurs in ombrotrophic peat, there is a significant gap in understanding the rate and depth of element release and how mobility varies within these ecosystems. Therefore, despite the recognition of their importance, ombrotrophic bogs remain relatively understudied, highlighting the need for further research to fill these knowledge gaps and gain a comprehensive understanding of their ecological processes.

== See also ==
- Chalk heath
- Mire
