= Minerotrophic =

Minerotrophic refers to environments that receive nutrients primarily through groundwater that flows through mineral-rich soils or rock, or surface water flowing over land. Minerotrophic, “minerogenous”, and “geogenous” are now often used interchangeably, although the latter two terms refer primarily to hydrological systems, while the former refers to nutrient dynamics. The hydrologic process behind minerotrophic wetlands results in water that has acquired dissolved chemicals which raise the nutrient levels and reduce the acidity. This in turn affects vegetation assemblages and diversity in the wetland in question. If dissolved chemicals include chemical bases such as calcium or magnesium ions, the water is referred to as base-rich and is neutral or alkaline. In contrast to minerotrophic environments, ombrotrophic environments get their water mainly from precipitation, and so are very low in nutrients and more acidic. Of the various wetland types, fens and rich fens are often minerotrophic while poor fens and bogs are often ombrotrophic. Marshes and swamps may also be fed through groundwater sources to a degree.

== Hydrology ==
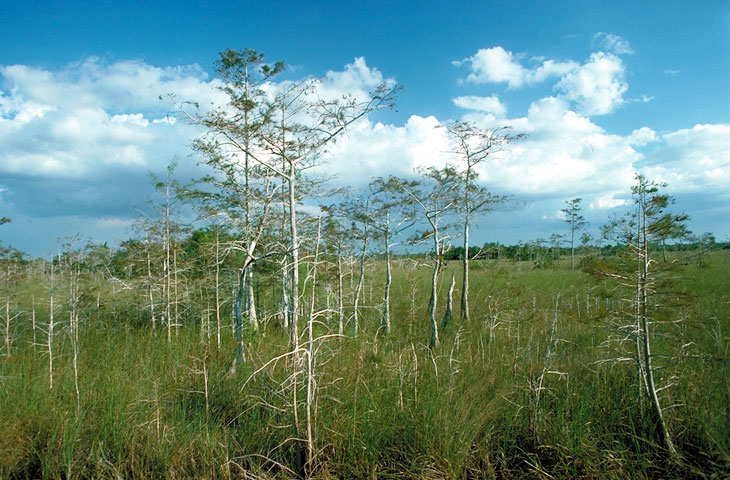
An image of the Everglades National Park, a large minerotrophic wetland located in the United States of America.

The hydrological setting of a wetland strongly influences its characteristics. Chemical ions are transported to wetlands via their hydrological system, and in turn affect pH, conductivity, and nutrient levels. Chemical and nutrient dynamics may differ depending on a minerotrophic wetland’s hydrological setting, which could include water discharge dominated, recharge dominated, or some combination of both. These characteristics also vary seasonally, as average groundwater levels increase and decrease at different times of the year. This seasonality can raise water below ground or above the surface to become free standing. Additional factors such as geological conditions, soil type, and surface morphology may also influence the characteristics of a wetland in tandem with hydrological setting.

== Vegetation communities ==
Stable water and nutrient availability via groundwater systems allows for a diverse array of plant species to grow in minerotrophic wetlands. This also allows for peat to accumulate provided the water does not flow too quickly. A minerotrophic wetland may be alkaline or weakly acidic, which also influences vegetation communities. Rich fens are often characterized by alkaline hydrologic conditions, allowing for more plant diversity. These areas may be dominated by brown mosses of the family Amblystegiaceae and sedges in the genus Carex. Acidic poor fens are often dominated by peat mosses of the genus Sphagnum which tend to further increase acidity.

== Examples ==
A notable example of a minerotrophic wetland is the Everglades, a large subtropical wetland located in Southern Florida, USA.

== See also ==
- Calcicole
- Calcifuge
- Peat
