= Mountain formation =

Geological processes that underlie the formation of mountains

Thrust and reverse fault movement are an important component of mountain formation.

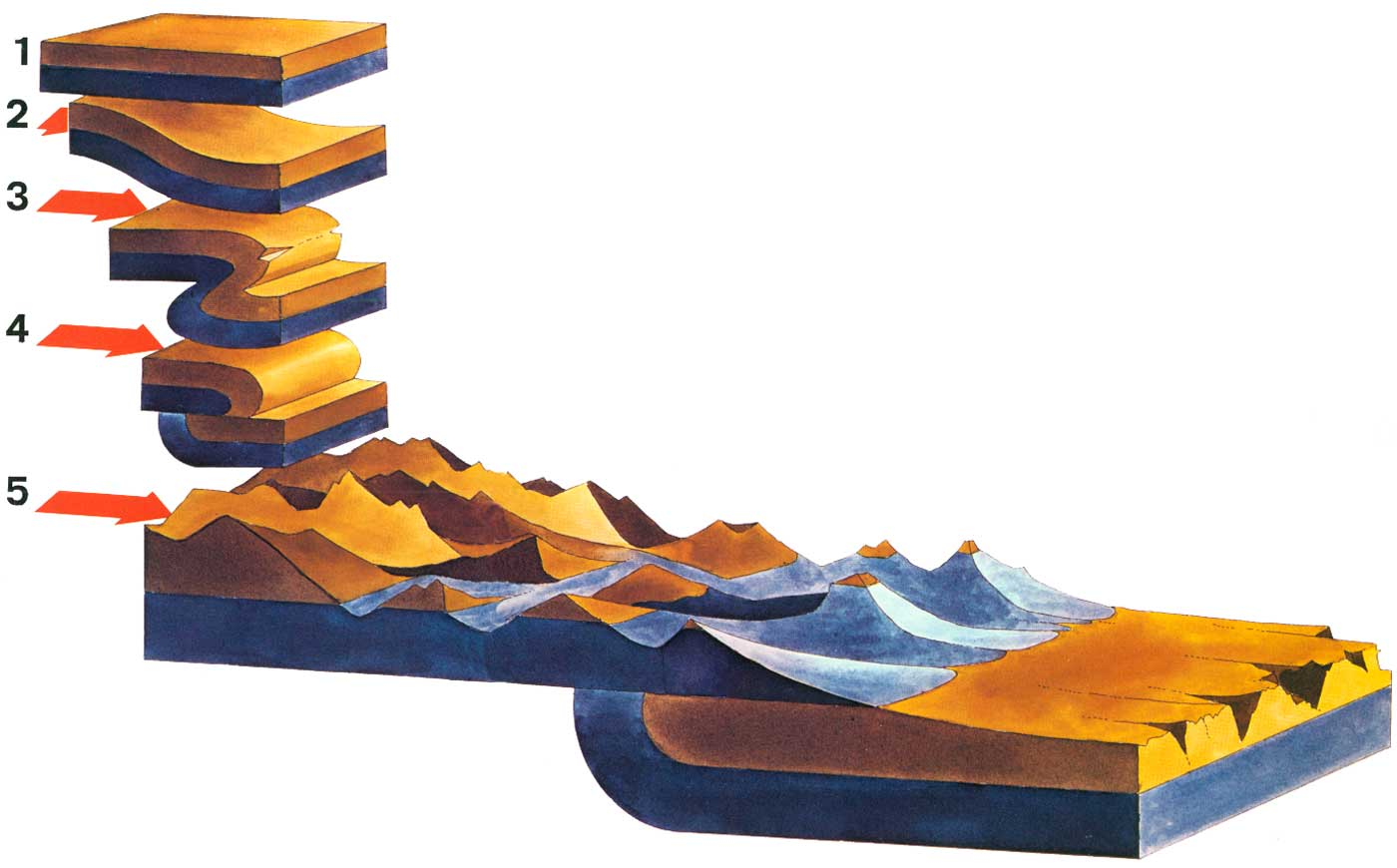
Illustration of mountains that developed on a fold that thrusted.

Mountain formation occurs due to a variety of geological processes associated with large-scale movements of Earth's crust (tectonic plates). Folding, faulting, volcanic activity, igneous intrusion and metamorphism can all be parts of the orogenic process of mountain building. The formation of mountains is not necessarily related to the geological structures found on it.

From the late 18th century until its replacement by plate tectonics in the 1960s, geosyncline theory was used to explain much mountain-building. The understanding of specific landscape features in terms of the underlying tectonic processes is called tectonic geomorphology, and the study of geologically young or ongoing processes is called neotectonics.

== Types of mountains ==
There are five main types of mountains: volcanic, fold, plateau, fault-block, and dome. A more detailed classification useful on a local scale predates plate tectonics and adds to these categories.

=== Volcanic mountains ===
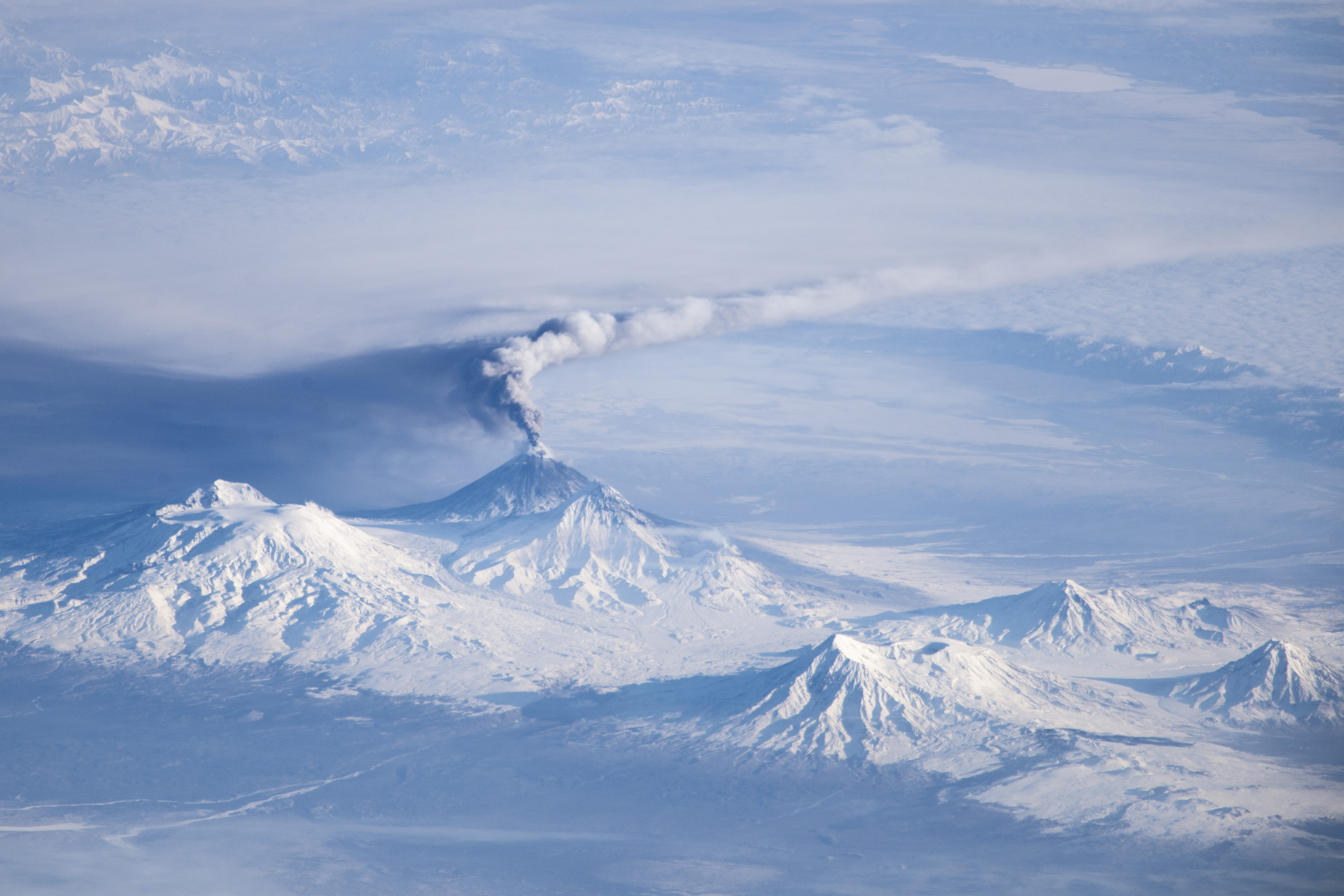
Annotated view includes Ushkovsky, Tolbachik, Bezymianny, Zimina, and Udina stratovolcanoes of Kamchatka, Russia. Oblique view taken on November 12, 2013, from ISS.

Movements of tectonic plates create volcanoes along the plate boundaries, which erupt and form mountains. A volcanic arc system is a series of volcanoes that form near a subduction zone where the crust of a sinking oceanic plate melts and drags water down with the subducting crust.

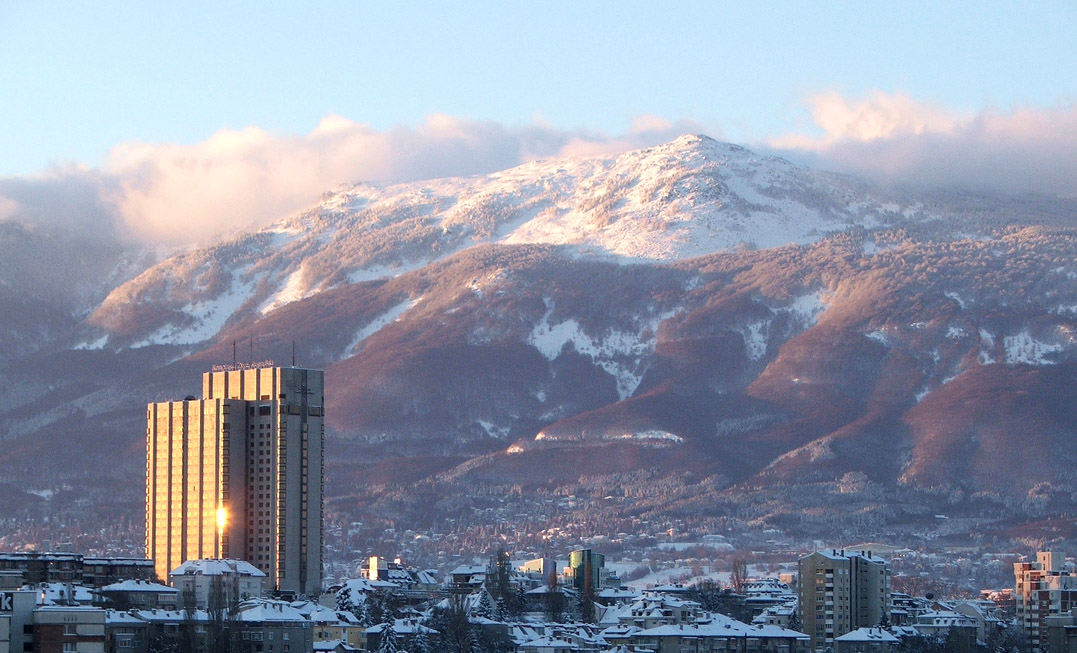
The Dome of Vitosha mountain next to Sofia

Most volcanoes occur in a band encircling the Pacific Ocean (the Pacific Ring of Fire), and in another that extends from the Mediterranean across Asia to join the Pacific band in the Indonesian Archipelago. The most important types of volcanic mountain are composite cones or stratovolcanoes and shield volcanoes.

A shield volcano has a gently sloping cone because of the low viscosity of the emitted material, primarily basalt. Mauna Loa is the classic example, with a slope of 4°-6°. (The relation between slope and viscosity falls under the topic of angle of repose.) A composite volcano or stratovolcano has a more steeply rising cone (33°-40°), because of the higher viscosity of the emitted material, and eruptions are more violent and less frequent than for shield volcanoes. Examples include Vesuvius, Kilimanjaro, Mount Fuji, Mount Shasta, Mount Hood and Mount Rainier.

=== Fold mountains ===
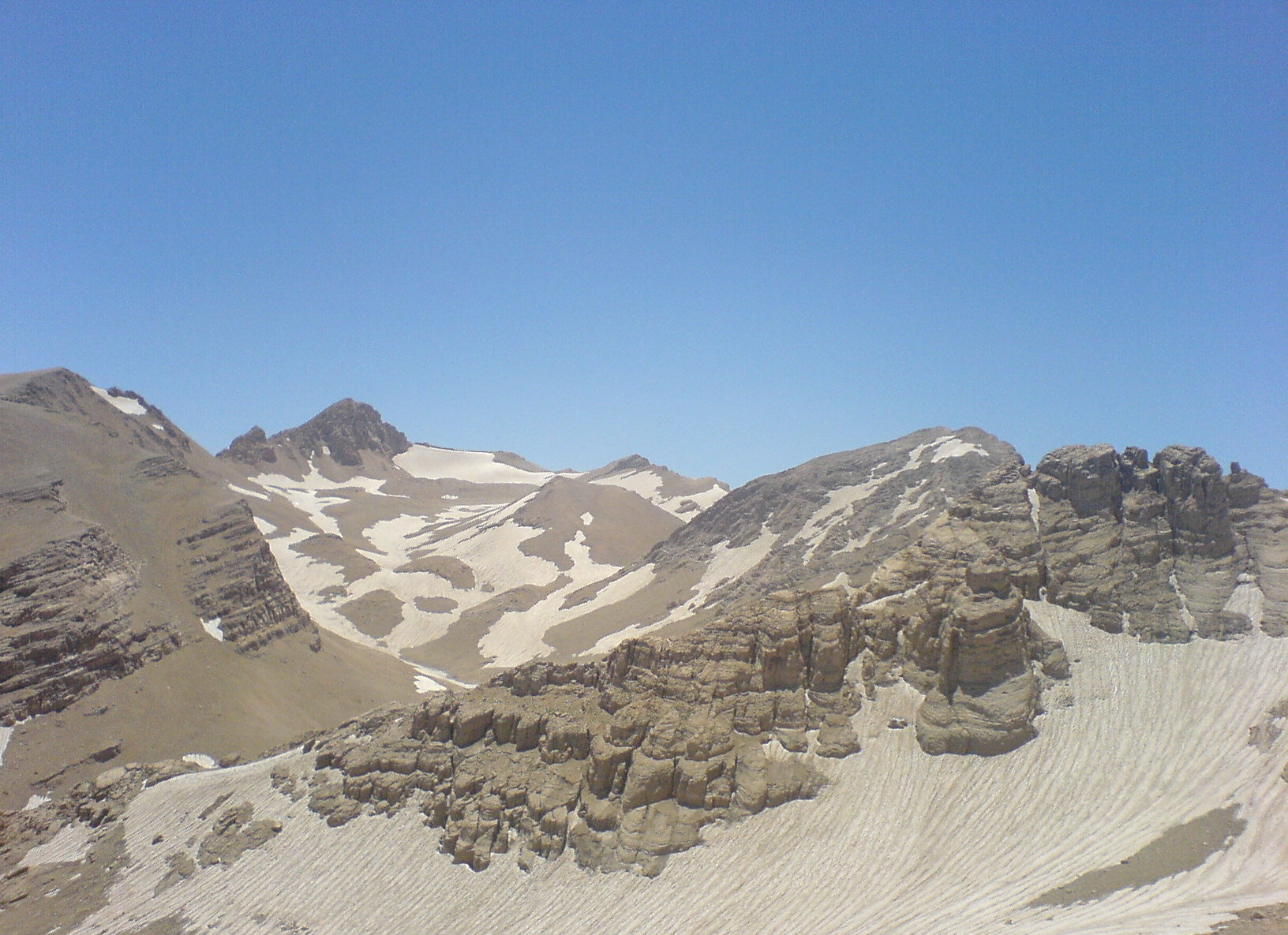
Zard-Kuh, a fold mountain in the central Zagros range of Iran.

When plates collide or undergo subduction (that is, ride one over another), the plates tend to buckle and fold, forming mountains. While volcanic arcs form at oceanic-continental plate boundaries, folding occurs at continental-continental plate boundaries. Most of the major continental mountain ranges are associated with thrusting and folding or orogenesis. Examples are the Balkan Mountains, the Jura and the Zagros mountains.

=== Block mountains ===
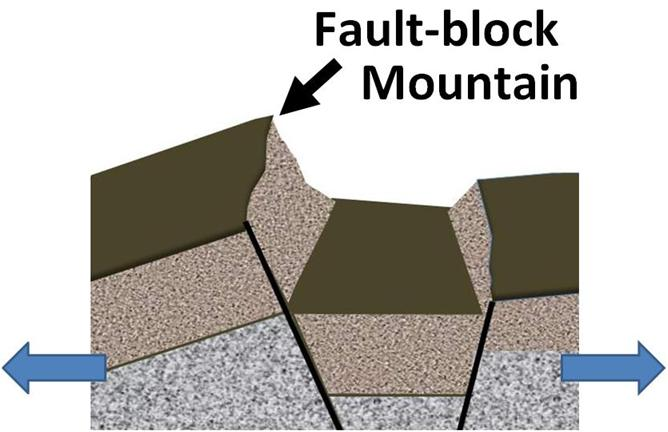
Fault-block mountain of the tilted type.

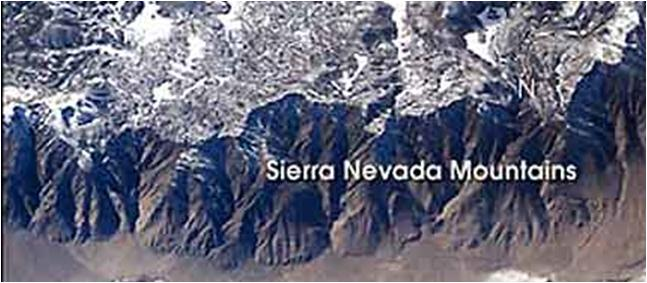
Sierra Nevada Mountains (formed by delamination) as seen from the International Space Station.

When a fault block is raised or tilted, a block mountain can result. Higher blocks are called horsts, and troughs are called grabens. A spreading apart of the surface causes tensional forces. When the tensional forces are strong enough to cause a plate to split apart, it does so such that a center block drops down relative to its flanking blocks.

An example is the Sierra Nevada range, where delamination created a block 650 km long and 80 km wide that consists of many individual portions tipped gently west, with east facing slips rising abruptly to produce the highest mountain front in the continental United States.

Another example is the Rila–Rhodope massif in Bulgaria, including the well defined horsts of Belasitsa (linear horst), Rila mountain (vaulted domed shaped horst) and Pirin mountain—a horst forming a massive anticline situated between the complex graben valleys of the Struma and Mesta rivers.

=== Uplifted passive margins ===
Unlike orogenic mountains there is no widely accepted geophysical model that explains elevated passive continental margins such as the Scandinavian Mountains, eastern Greenland, the Brazilian Highlands, or Australia's Great Dividing Range. Different elevated passive continental margins most likely share the same mechanism of uplift. This mechanism is possibly related to far-field stresses in Earth's lithosphere. According to this view elevated passive margins can be likened to giant anticlinal lithospheric folds, where folding is caused by horizontal compression acting on a thin to thick crust transition zone (as are all passive margins).

== Models ==
=== Hotspot volcanoes ===
Hotspots are supplied by a magma source in the Earth's mantle called a mantle plume. Although originally attributed to a melting of subducted oceanic crust, recent evidence belies this connection. The mechanism for plume formation remains a research topic.

=== Fault blocks ===
Several movements of Earth's crust that lead to mountains are associated with faults. These movements actually are amenable to analysis that can predict, for example, the height of a raised block and the width of an intervening rift between blocks using the rheology of the layers and the forces of isostasy. Early bent plate models predicting fractures and fault movements have evolved into today's kinematic and flexural models.

== See also ==
- 3D fold evolution
- Continental collision – Formation of mountains from converging tectonic plates
- Cycle of erosion – Model of geographic landscape evolution
- Inselberg – Isolated, steep rock hill on relatively flat terrain
- Seamount – Mountain rising from the ocean seafloor that does not reach the water's surface
