= Klyuchevskaya Sopka =

Volcano on the Kamchatka peninsula, Russia

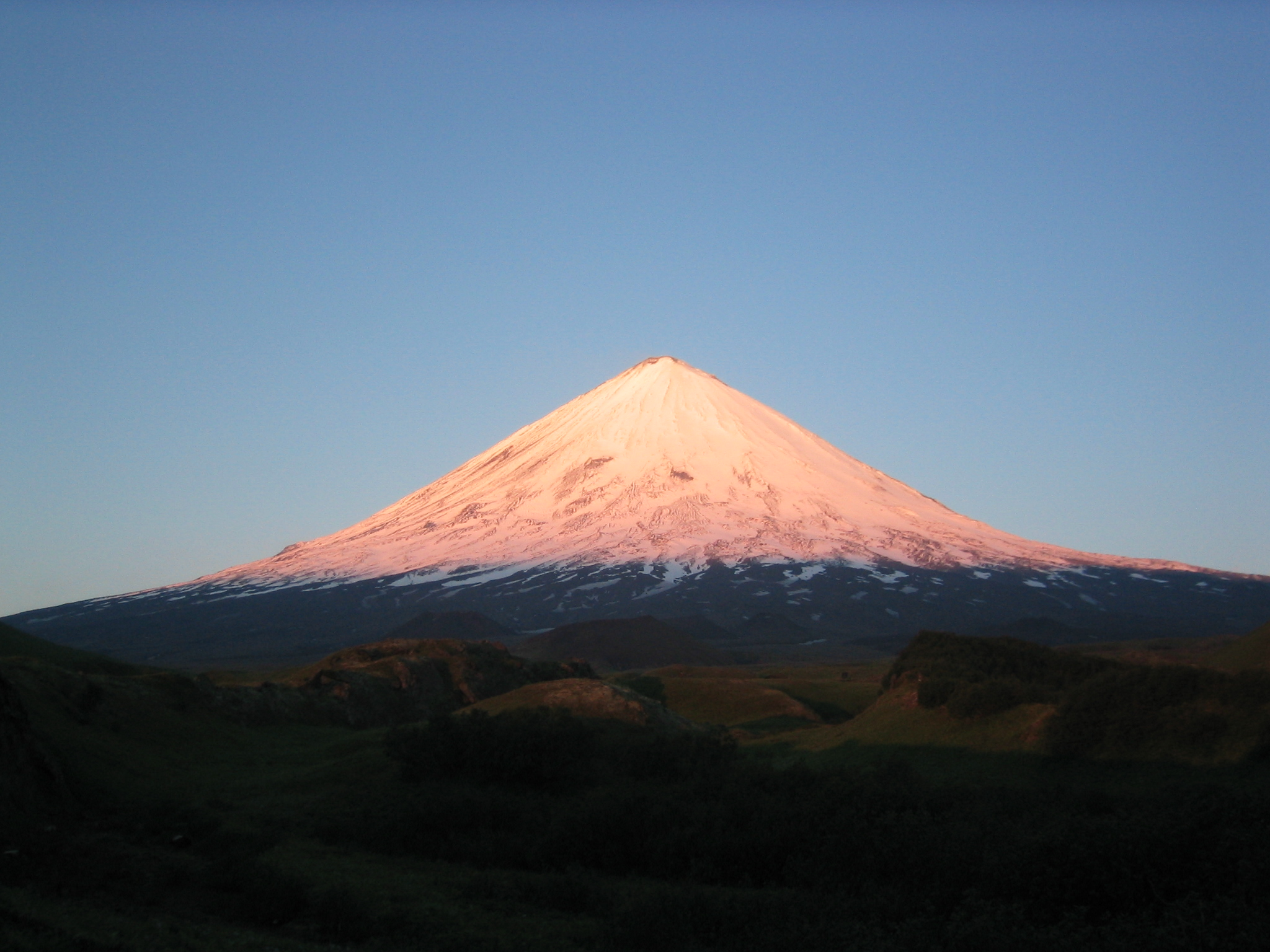
- Klyuchevskaya Sopka in January 2007

Highest point
- Elevation: 4,754 m (15,597 ft)
- Prominence: 4,649 m (15,253 ft); Ranked 13th
- Listing: Ultra, Ribu; World's most isolated peaks 15th
- Coordinates: 56°03′22″N 160°38′39″E

Geography
- Location within Kamchatka Krai
- Location: Kamchatka, Russia
- Parent range: Eastern Range

Geology
- Mountain type: Stratovolcano (active)
- Last eruption: July 30, 2025 – ongoing

Climbing
- First ascent: 1788 by Daniel Gauss and 2 others
- Easiest route: basic rock/snow climb

Klyuchevskaya Sopka (Russian: Ключевская сопка; also known as Klyuchevskoi, Russian: Ключевской) is an active stratovolcano, the highest mountain of Siberia and the highest active volcano of Eurasia. Its steep, symmetrical cone rises roughly 100 kilometres (60 mi) inland from the Bering Sea. The volcano is part of the Volcanoes of Kamchatka UNESCO World Heritage Site. Klyuchevskaya Sopka is ranked 15th in the world by topographic isolation.

Klyuchevskaya appeared 7,000 years ago. Its first recorded eruption occurred in 1697, and it has been almost continuously active ever since, as have many of its neighboring volcanoes. It was first climbed in 1788 by Daniel Gauss and two other members of the Billings Expedition. No other ascents were recorded until 1931, when several climbers were killed by flying lava on the descent. As similar dangers still exist today, few ascents are made.

== Eruptions ==
Klyuchevskaya Sopka has erupted 110 times during the Holocene Epoch.

=== Eruptions in the 2000s ===
2007: Beginning in early January to February, Klyuchevskaya Sopka began another eruption cycle. Students from the University of Alaska Fairbanks and scientists of the Alaska Volcano Observatory traveled to Kamchatka in the spring to monitor the eruption. On 28 June, the volcano began to experience the largest explosions so far recorded in this eruption cycle, with the Colour Code raising to Red. An ash plume from the eruption reached a height of 10 km (33,000 ft) before drifting eastward, disrupting air traffic between the United States and Asia and causing ashfalls on Alaska's Unimak Island.

=== Eruptions in the 2010s ===
2010: As early as 27 February, gas plumes had erupted from Klyuchevskaya Sopka, reaching elevations of 7,000 m (22,966 ft). During the first week of March, both explosive ash eruptions and effusive lava eruptions occurred until 9 March; the ash cloud was reported to have reached an elevation of 6,000 m (19,685 ft). As well, significant thermal anomalies have been reported, and gas-steam plumes extended roughly 50 km (31 mi) to the north-east from the volcano beginning on 3 March.

2012: On 15 October, the volcano had a weak eruption that stopped the following day. A weak thermal eruption occurred on 29 November, then stopped again which can be attributable to the larger eruption occurring at neighbouring volcano Tolbachik due to their shared magma chamber.

All of its neighboring volcanoes Bezymianny, Karymsky, Kizimen, Shiveluch, and in particular Tolbachik erupted more actively and continuously, taking a major magma supply load off of Klyuchevskaya Sopka.

January 2013: On 25 January, the volcano had a weak Strombolian eruption that stopped the following day. During January, all volcanoes in the eastern part of Kamchatka—Bezymianny, Karymsky, Kizimen, Klyuchevskaya Sopka, Shiveluch, and Tolbachik—erupted, with the exception of Kamen.

August 2013: On 15 August, the volcano had another weak Strombolian eruption with some slight lava flow that put on an excellent fireworks display before stopping on 21 August 2013, when Gorely Volcano woke up and started erupting again in relief of Klyuchevskaya Sopka.

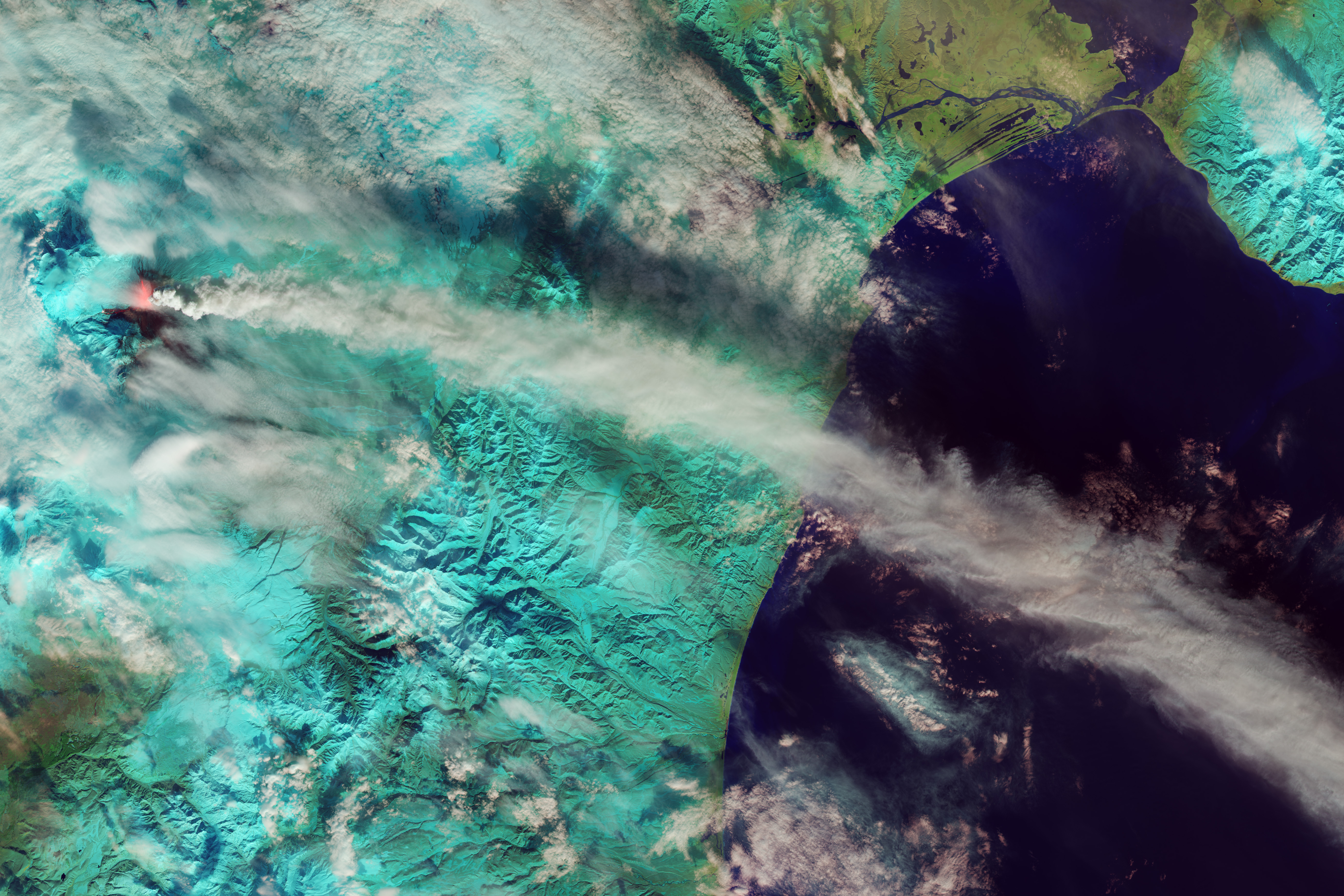
False color image of the October 17, 2013, eruption

October 2013: On 12 October, Klyuchevskaya Sopka had another three days of on-and-off eruptions with anomalies and a short ash plume, possibly indicating Strombolian and weak Vulcanian activity. An explosion from a new cinder cone low on Kliuchevskoi's southwest flank occurred on 12 October. An ash plume rose to altitudes of 6–7 km (20,000–23,000 ft), and drifted eastward. The eruptions weakened and paused by 16 October 2013.

November/December 2013: On 19 November, a strong explosion occurred, and observers reported that ash plumes rose to altitudes of 10–12 km (33,000–39,000 ft) and drifted southeast. The Aviation Color Code was raised to Red. Later that day, the altitudes of the ash plumes were lower and the eruptions weakened and stopped again. On 7 December, activity at Kliuchevskoi significantly increased, having continued during 29 November – 7 December, prompting KVERT to raise the Alert Level to Red. Ash plumes rose to altitudes of 5.5–6 km (18,000–20,000 ft) above sea level and drifted more than 212 km (132 mi) northeast and over 1,000 km (621 mi) east. According to a news article, a warning to aircraft was issued for the area around the volcanoes. Video showed gas-and-steam activity, and satellite images detected a daily weak thermal anomaly. On 9 December, the Alert Level was lowered to Green when the eruptions abruptly stopped.

2015: On 2 January, after a one-year period of inactivity, the volcano had a Strombolian eruption which stopped on 16 January. Minor eruptions resumed on 10 March and stopped on 24 March. On 27 August, the volcano had another Strombolian eruption which ended 16 hours later.

2019: Kluchevskaya Sopka saw renewed eruptive activity beginning in 2019. On 25 October, the volcano had another weak Strombolian eruption which ended some 30 hours later.

=== Eruptions in the 2020s ===
2020: The volcano erupted on 9 December, with ash explosions going up to 7 km (23,000 ft) high.

2022: An eruption started on 20 November following an earthquake near the area.

2023: A Strombolian eruption started on 22 June. The June eruption follows nearby eruptions on 11 April in other volcanoes in the area. A significant eruptive event occurred as part of ongoing activity on 1 November, sending ash as high as 13 km (43,000 ft) above sea level and causing flight delays as far away as Vancouver, Canada, on 4–5 November.

2025: An eruption occurred on 30 July, shortly after a large earthquake in Kamchatka. The eruption was not directly caused by the earthquake; activity at the volcano had been observed over the preceding days.

== 2022 climbing accidents ==
In September 2022, nine people died while climbing Kluchevskaya Sopka. They were part of a 12-strong group of Russian nationals, which included two guides. Five climbers were killed after a fall at about 4,000 meters. Another four, including a guide, died on the mountainside afterwards. A rescue helicopter managed to land at 1,663 meters at the fourth attempt, bringing rescuers who faced a two-day climb to reach a volcanologists' hut at 3,300 meters where the three survivors were sheltering.

== Images ==
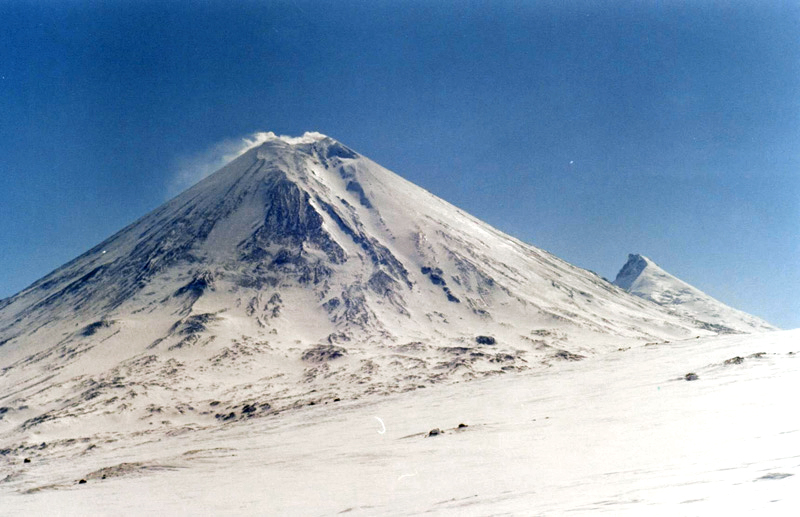
Klyuchevskaya Sopka in July 2006.

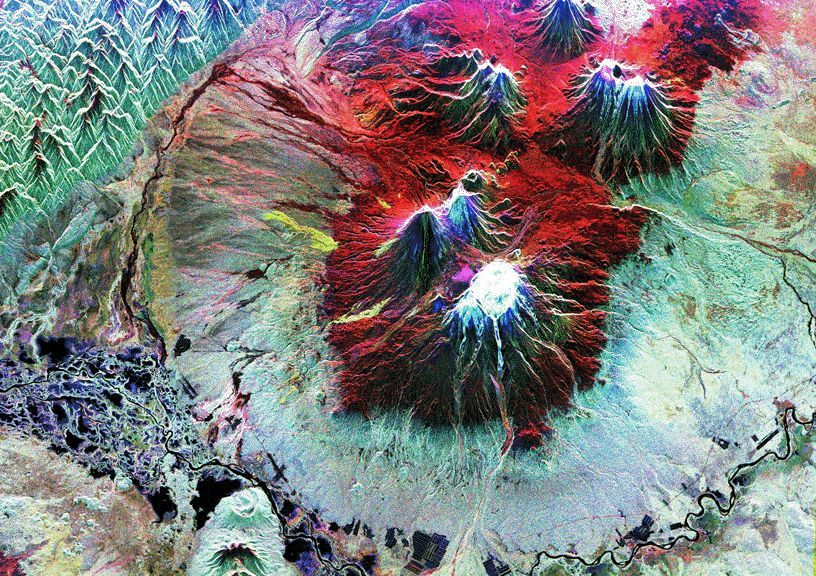
Space radar image over SRTM Elevation of Klyuchevskaya Sopka in October 1994.

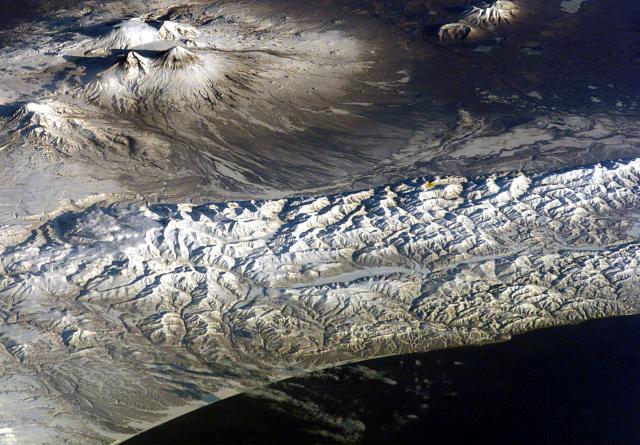
Satellite image of Klyuchevskaya Sopka in April 2010 by NASA.

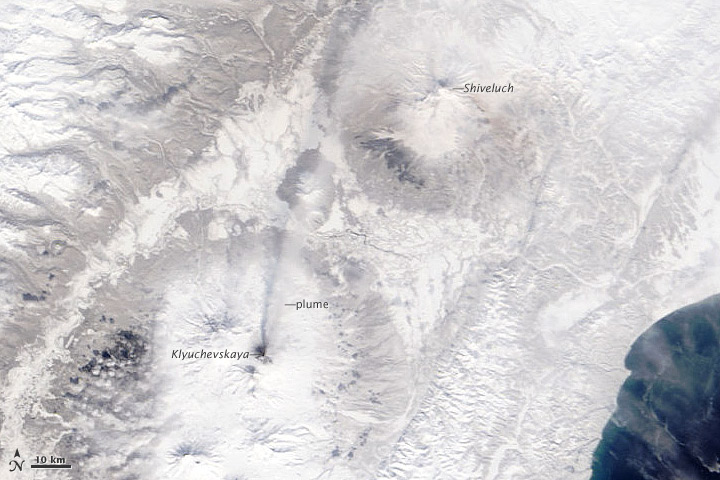
Satellite image and map of Klyuchevskaya Sopka in 2002 by NASA.

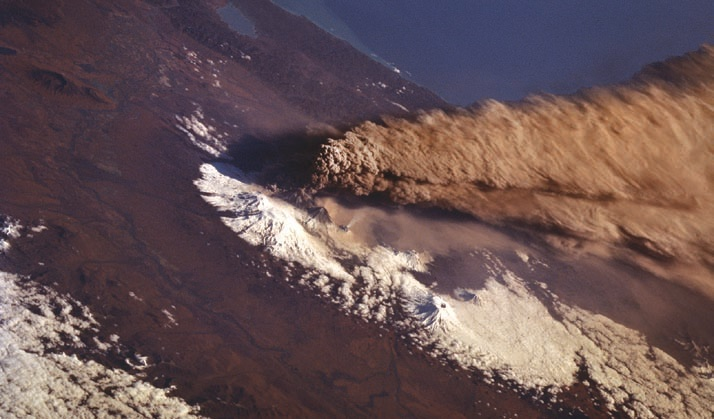
The eruption of October 1994.

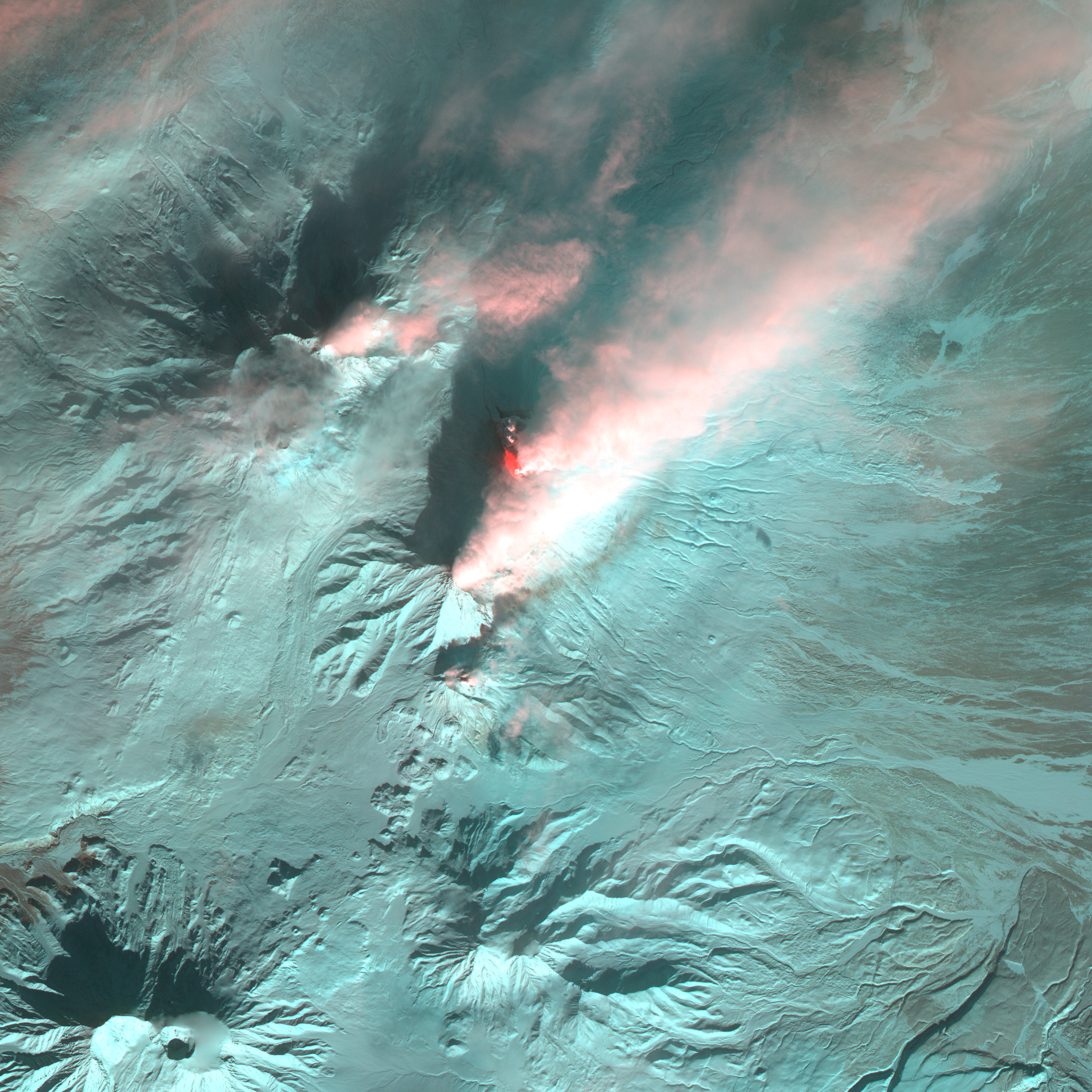
The eruption of February 2005.

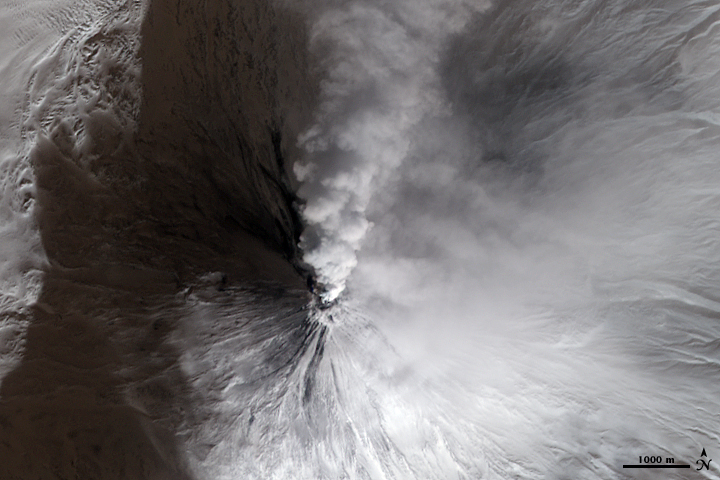
The eruption of February 2010 taken by NASA ASTER.

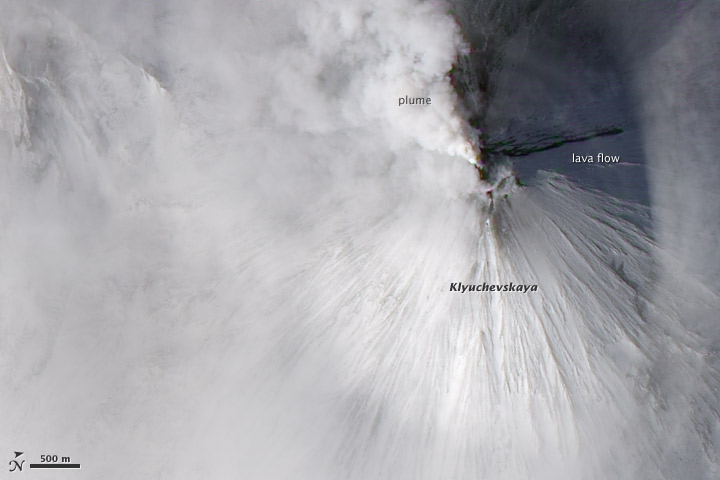
The eruption of March 2010.

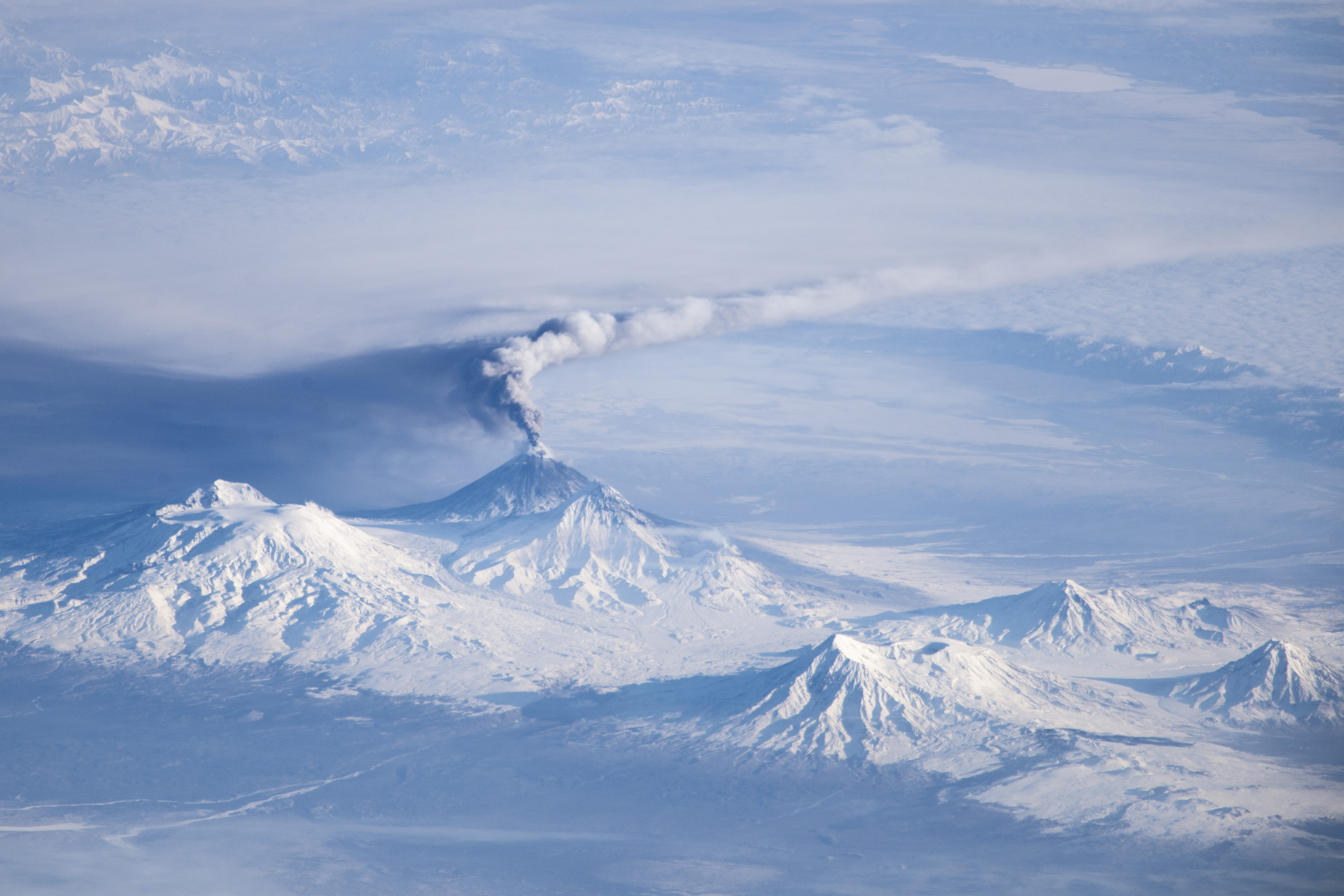
The eruption of 16 November 2013. Ushkovsky, Tolbachik, Zimina, Udina, and Bezymianny are also visible.

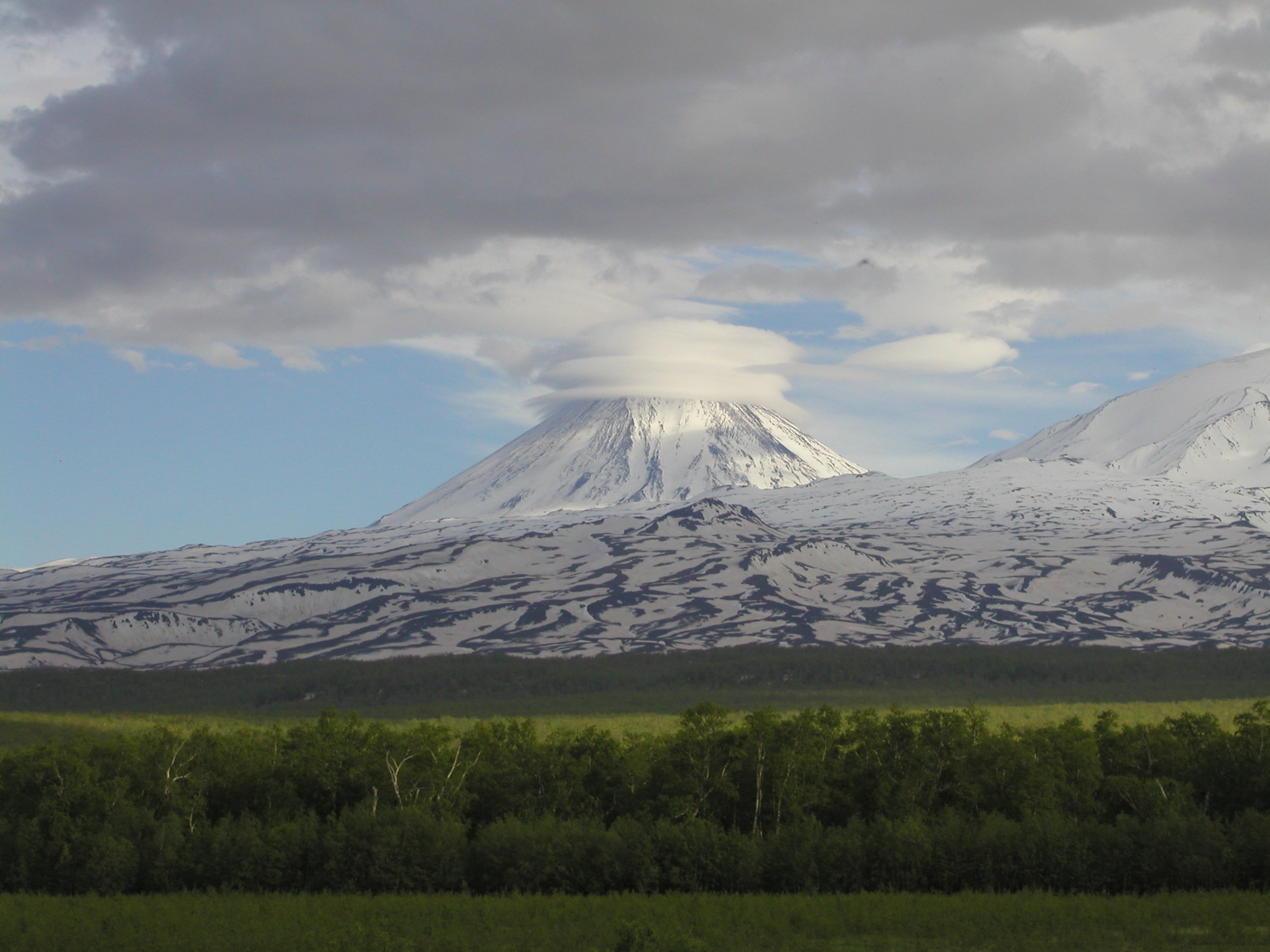
Kluchevskaya Sopka.

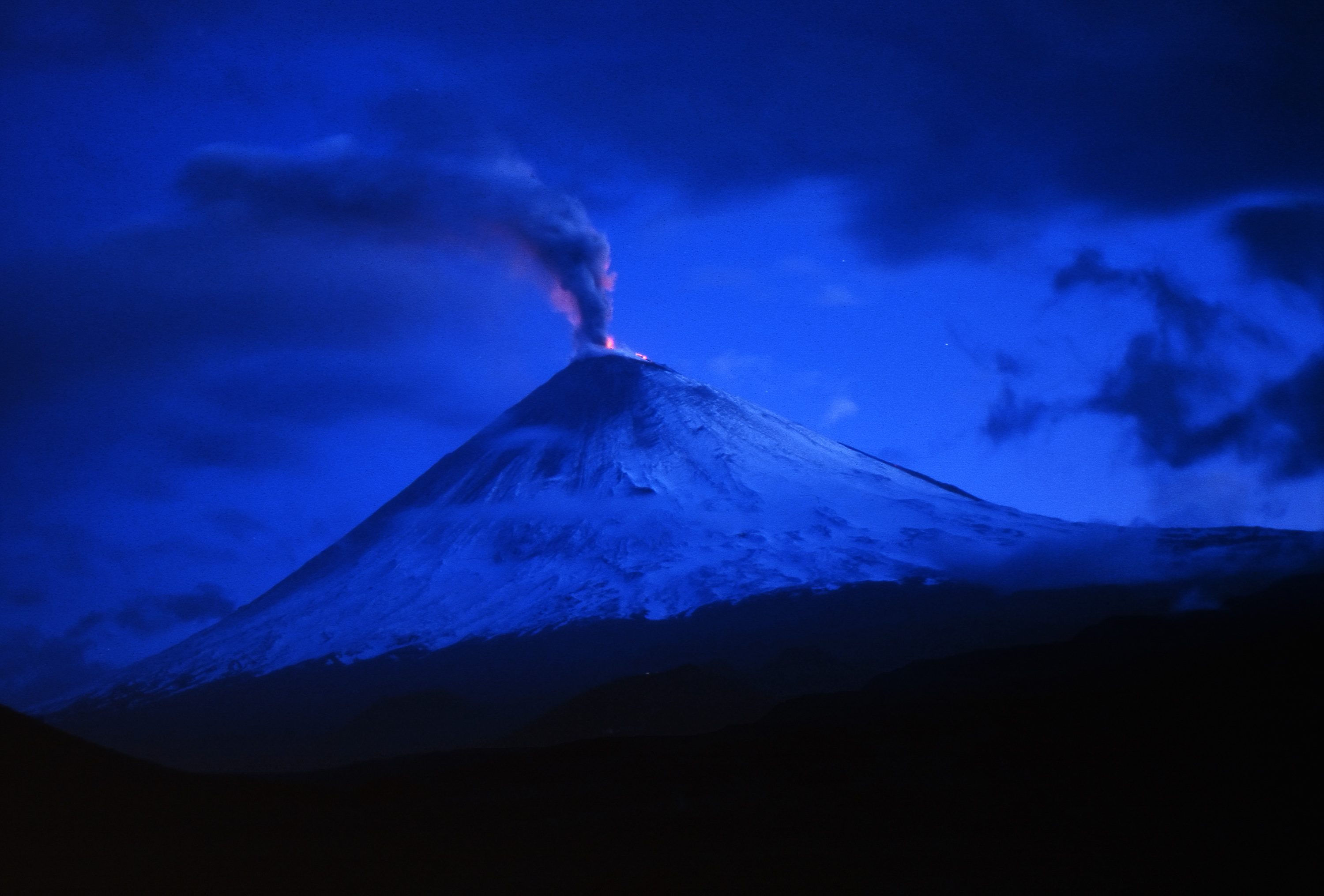
The eruption of summer 1993.

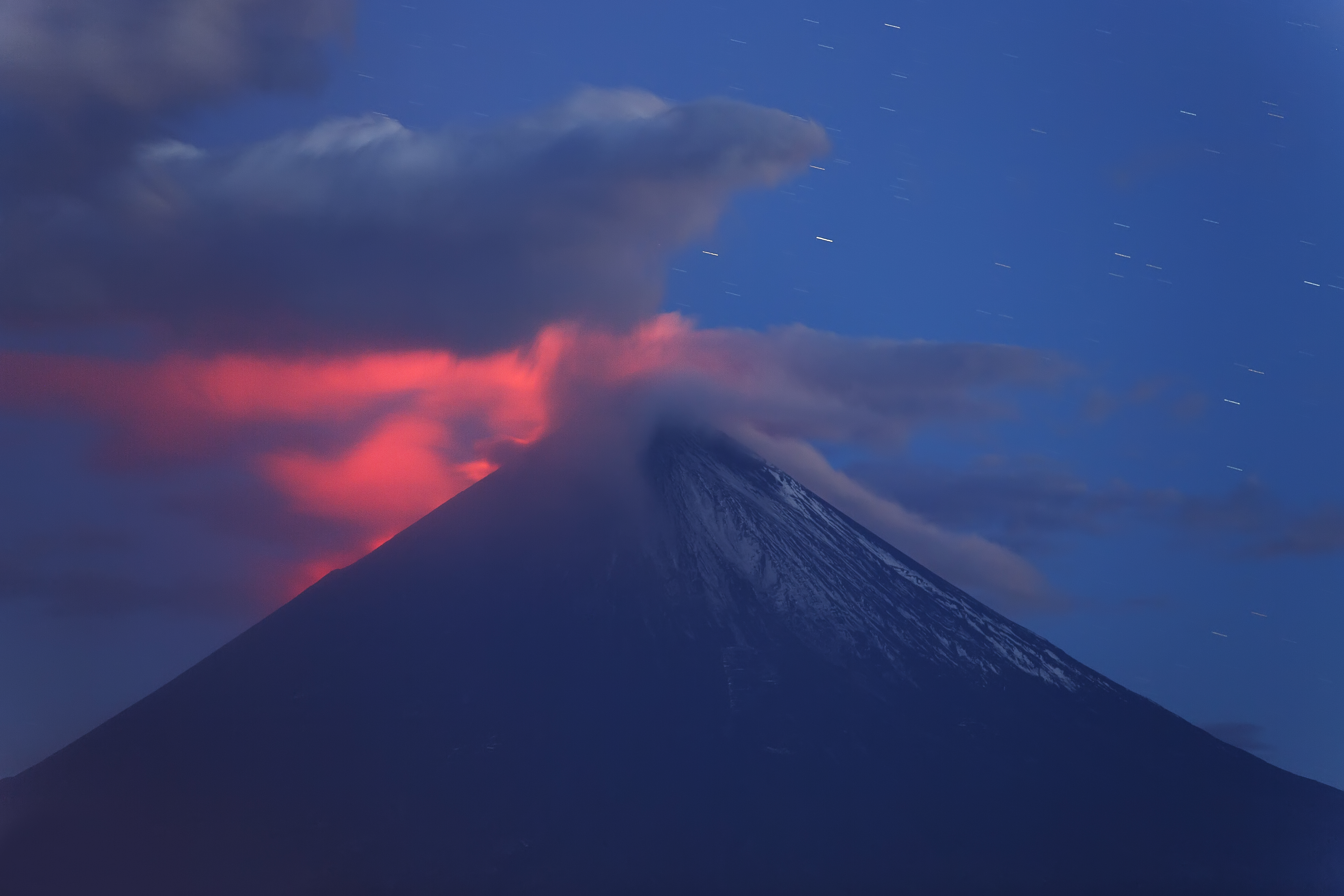
The eruption of July 2016.

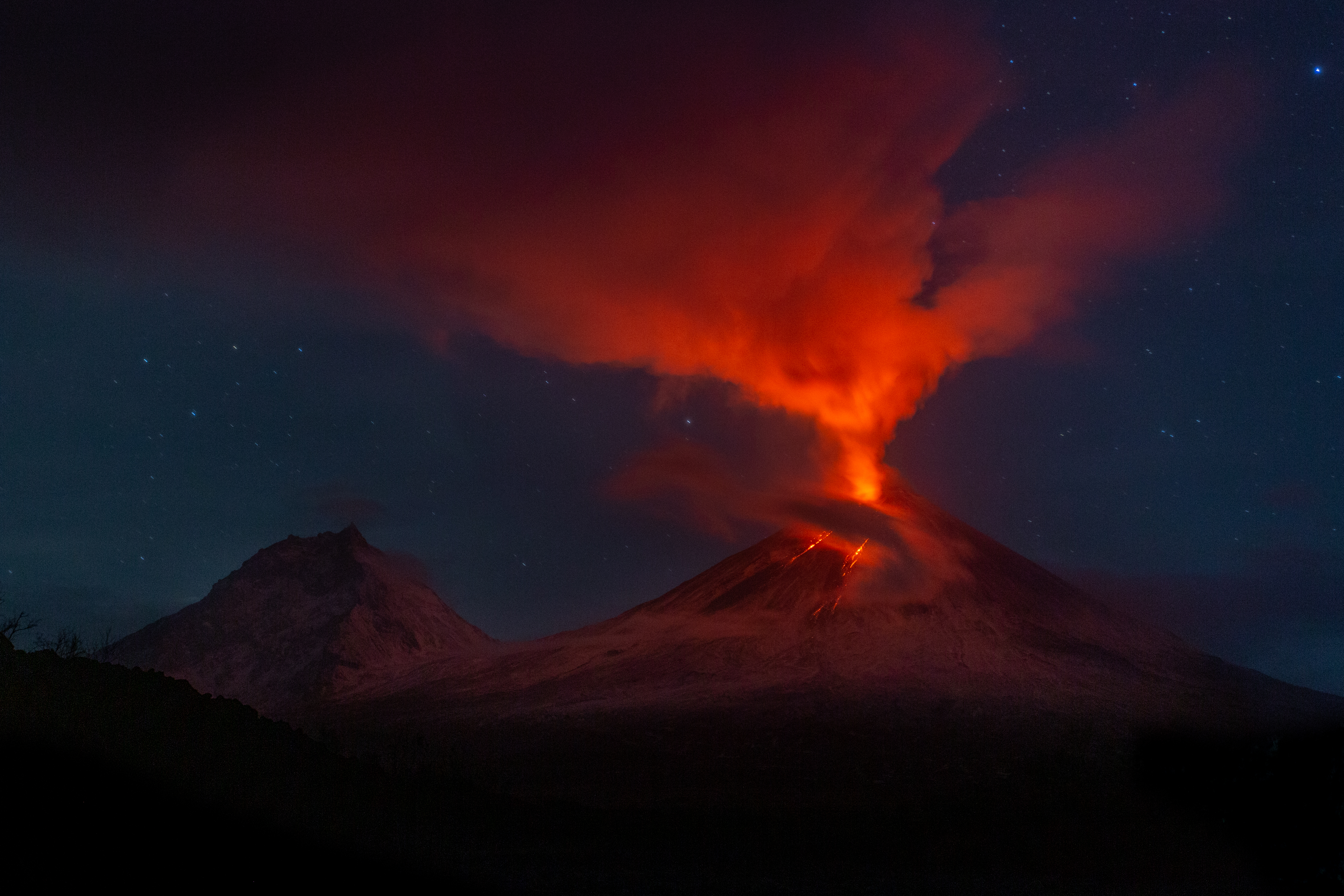
The eruption of October 2016.

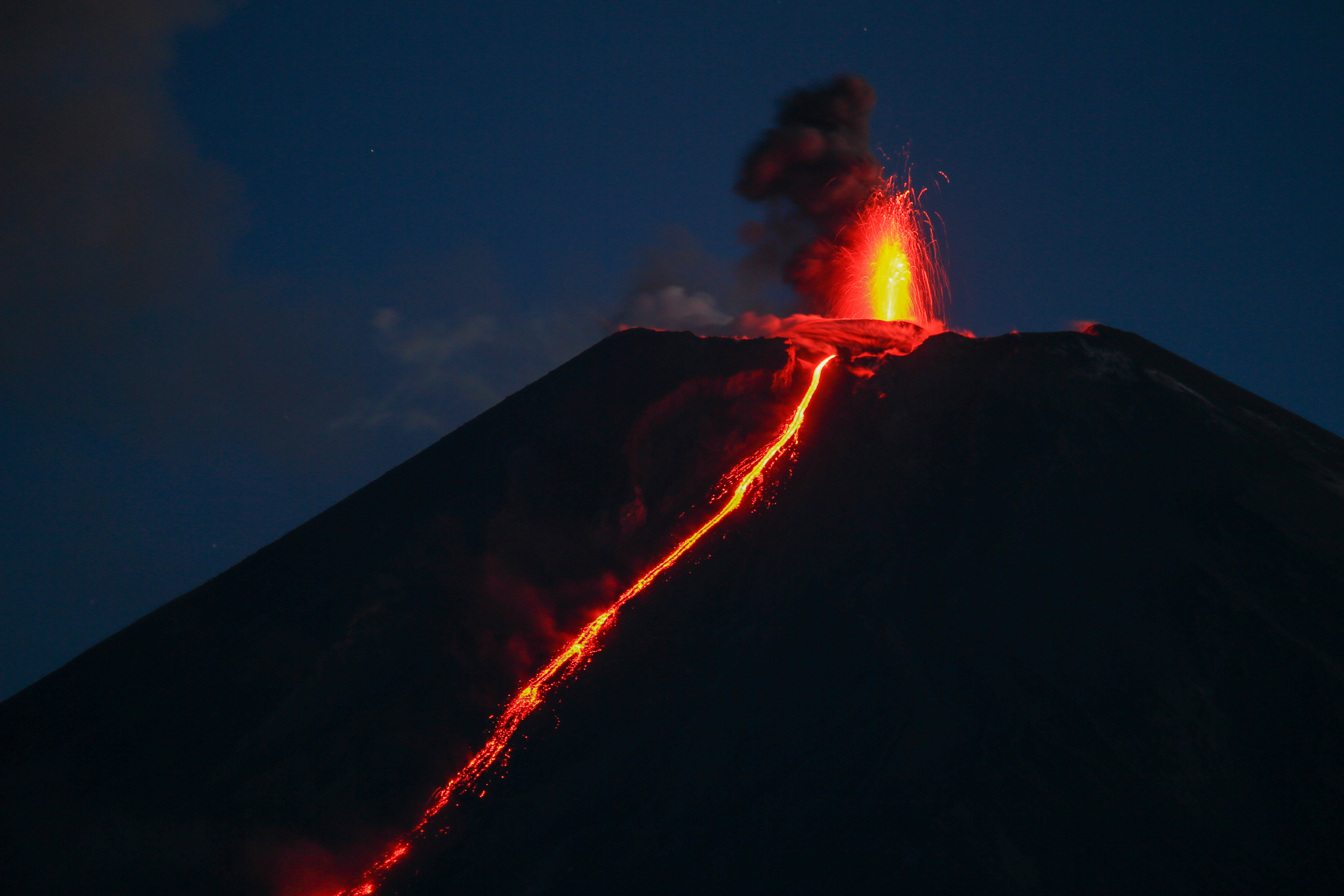
The eruption of June 2020.

== See also ==
- List of volcanoes in Russia
- Kronotsky Nature Reserve
- Valley of Geysers
- Kamchatka Peninsula
- Kamchatka Volcanic Eruption Response Team
- List of highest points of Russian federal subjects
