= Klyuchevsky =

Klyuchevsky (masculine), Klyuchevskaya (feminine), or Klyuchevskoye (neuter) may refer to:

- Vasily Klyuchevsky (1841–1911), Russian historian
- Klyuchevsky District, a district of Altai Krai, Russia
- Klyuchevsky (inhabited locality) (Klyuchevskaya, Klyuchevskoye), name of several inhabited localities in Russia
- Klyuchevskaya Sopka, a stratovolcano on the Kamchatka Peninsula, Russia
