= Kamen (volcano) =

Dormant volcano in the Russian Far East

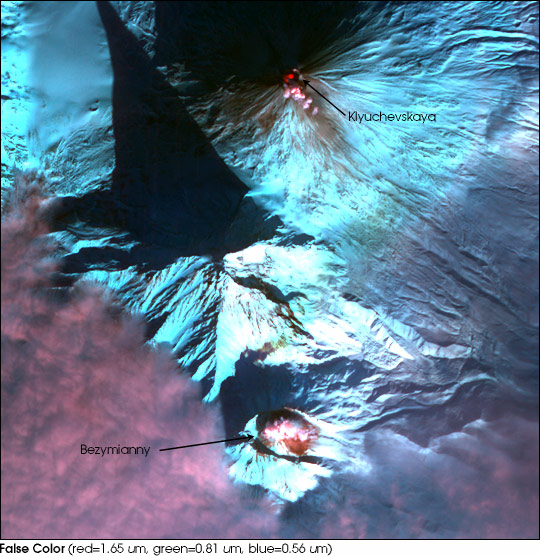
- Kamchatka volcanoes: Klyuchevskaya Sopka (top), Bezymianny (bottom), both in activity, and the Kamen (middle).

Highest point
- Elevation: 4,585 m (15,043 ft)
- Prominence: 1,298 m (4,259 ft)
- Coordinates: 56.02°N 160.593°E

Naming
- Native name: Камень (Russian)
- English translation: Stone

Geography
- Location within Kamchatka Krai
- Location: Kamchatka, Russia
- Parent range: Eastern Range

Geology
- Mountain type: Stratovolcano
- Last eruption: Unknown

Climbing
- First ascent: 1958 by F. Chelnikov and company.

Kamen (Russian: Камень, literally Stone) is a dormant stratovolcano located in the southern part of Kamchatka Peninsula, Russia, flanked by Bezymianny and Kluchevskaya. It is the second highest volcano of Kamchatka and sits above a shield volcano next to its neighboring volcanos. While the proximity between Kamen and its neighbors are relatively close, the lavas produced by all of them is different.

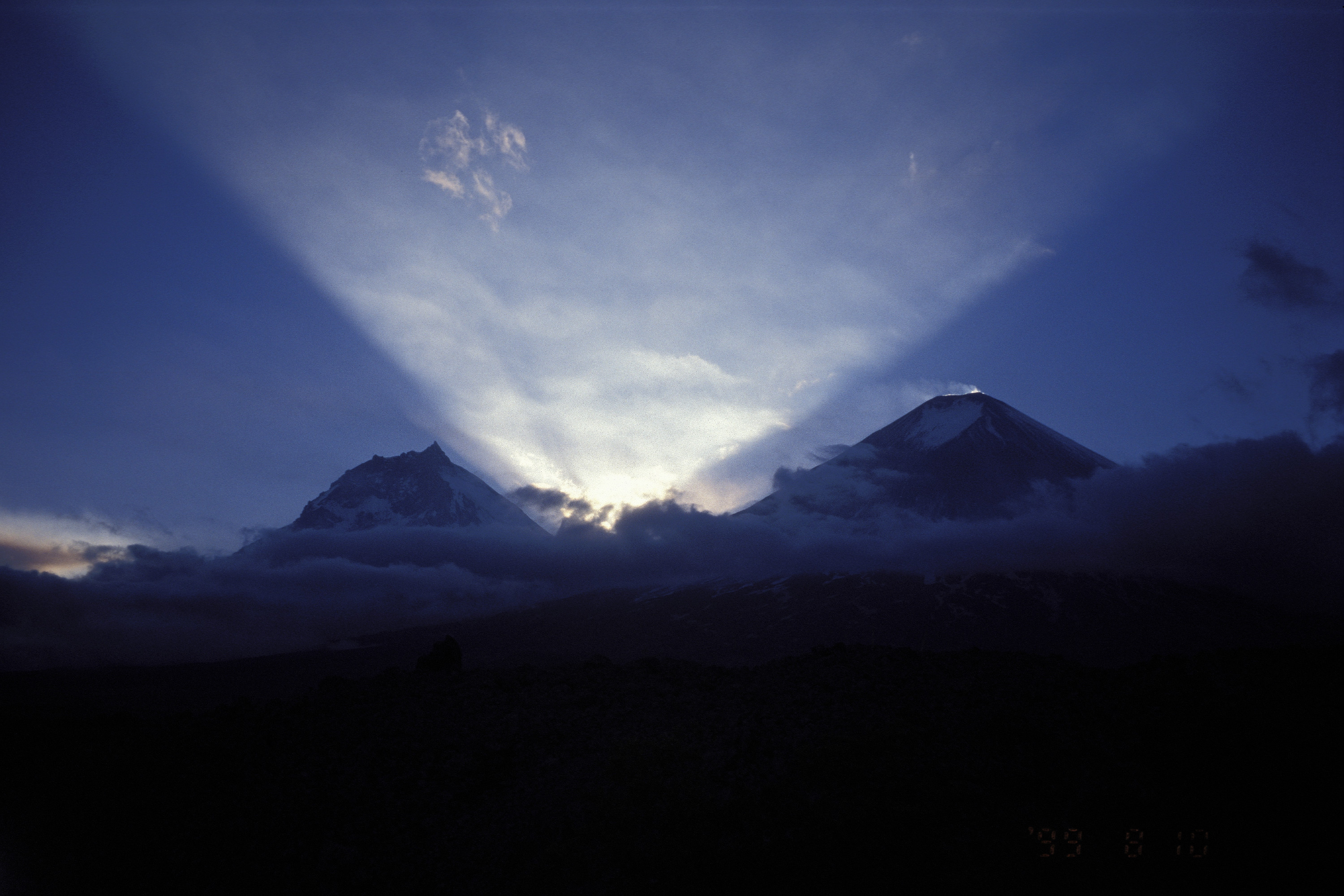
Kamen (left) and Kluchevskaya Sopka (right)

== History ==
Kamen was formed over large lava plateaus in two different stages of eruptions. The first stage was explosive and produced pyroclastic debris which mainly contained tuffs while the second stage aimed to be the opposite. This stage began the formation of dikes (often reaching up to 2 kilometers long and 5 meters thick) which served as a way for magma to flow upward in order to help the volcano erupt. These same eruption stages were also how Kamen's neighboring volcanoes were formed. As Kamen continued to age, so did the compositions within its lava. When the stratovolcano was born, the lava it would often produce would contain mafic materials. However, as Kamen grew older, it started to show a decline in these minerals.

=== Collapses ===
Between 10,000 and 11,000 years ago, Kamen had gone dormant due to its magma supply being removed. This has later resulted in the destruction of the volcano's cone due to gravitational collapse as well as other natural occurrences. Because of these collapses, Kamen hasn't been able to maintain its original structure, in fact only about 60% of the volcano's original topography remains with the edifice being mostly destroyed. After these collapses emerged, they were able to create debris avalanche deposits and Toreva blocks which were actually materials that were once part of the volcanic cone. However these collapses didn't just cause destruction, in fact they were able to support the formation of a new volcano called Bezymianny. After Kamen's volcanic breccia fell down its slope, the debris was then buried by other deposits so Bezymianny could form overtop.

== Geological setting ==
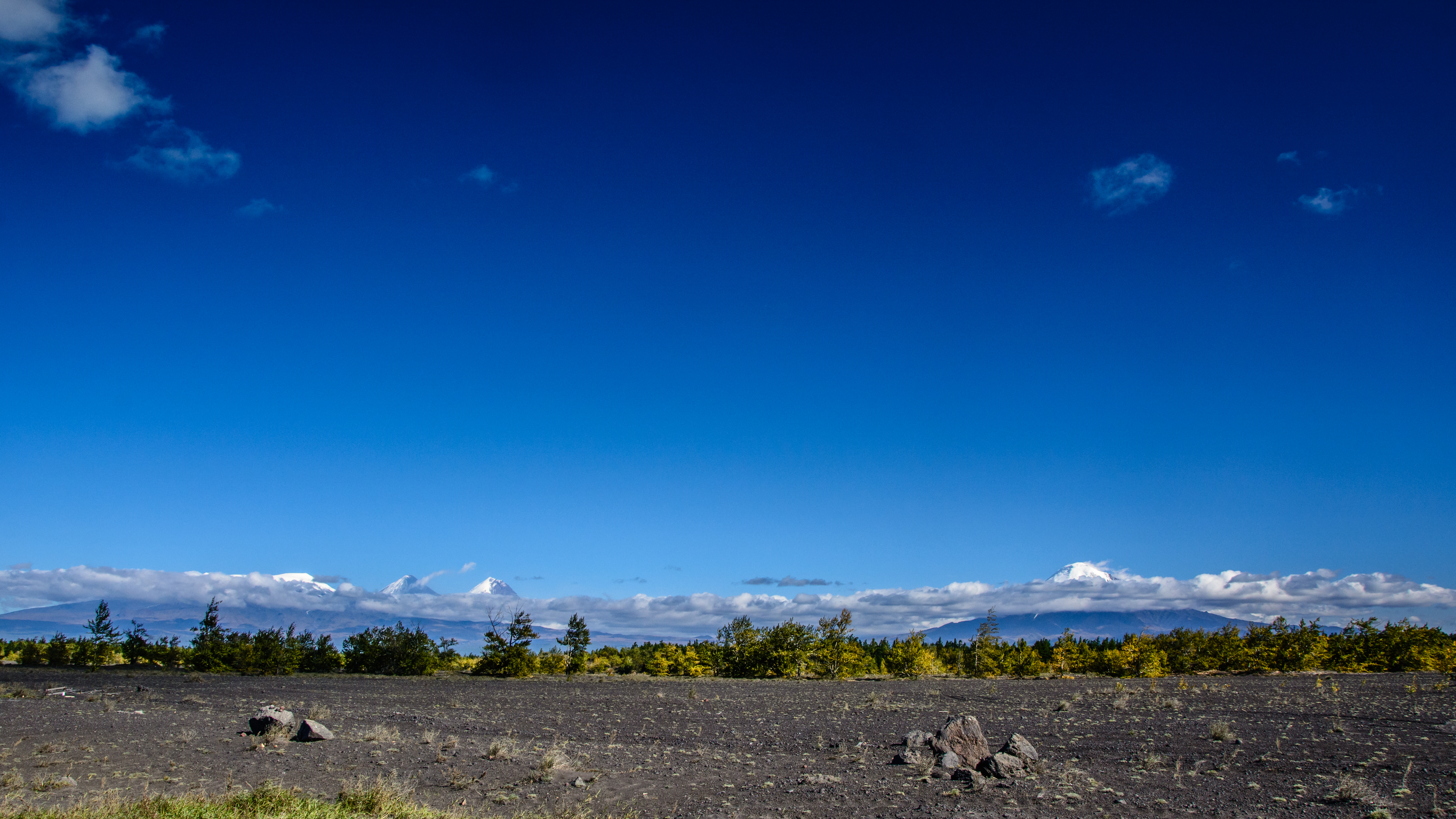
Some volcanos of the KVG, Ushkovsky, Klyuchevskaya Sopka, Tolbachik and Kamen.

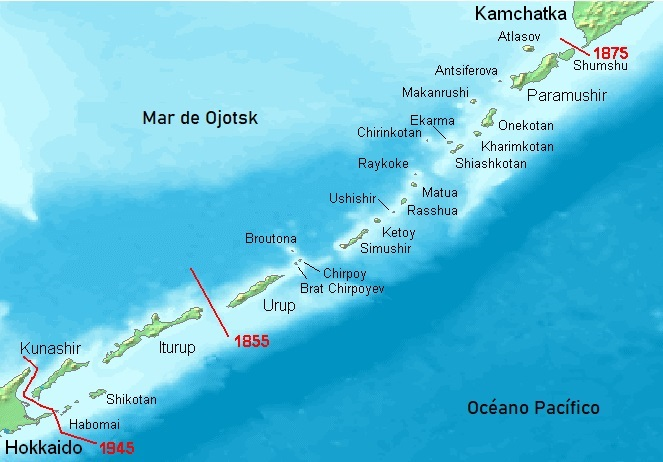
Map of the Kurile Islands.

Kamen is part of what is known as the Klyuchevskaya group of volcanoes (KVG) which is actually part of a much broader collection of volcanoes called the Kamchatka-Kurile volcanic arc. This volcanic arc contains a total of 210 volcanoes, 67 of them being active while the other 143 are extinct. Because Kamen is housed within the KVG, the main source of its energy comes from several magma chambers which were created from the subduction zone it sits over. This energy is a result of the Pacific plate being partially melted as it submerges underneath the Eurasian and North American plates it converges with. Since the KVG are resting above a subduction zone, it means that the region is active even though Kamen itself is dormant. The 3 volcanoes in this group that are still active now are Bezymianny, Klyuchevskoy, and Tolbachik. Klyuchevskoy first erupted about 5,000 years ago and has erupted about every 7 years since. Bezymianny was believed to be extinct until it started a series of earthquakes in 1955. It then later followed with an eruption and explosion which created a new crater and caldera. This explosion also caused a large amount of volcanic ash and lava blocks to form which caused mudflows to emerge when it mixed with snow. Since Kamen is a neighbor of these active volcanoes, it would have posed these same hazards or similar to the two rivers, Studenaya and Khapitsa, as well as the Kozyrevsk and Klyuchi cities nearby if it were still active. As of today, Kamen is mostly covered by a glacier, however a major landslide was able to open up the interior of the volcano which offered a new perspective for observing it's cross sections.

== Lava composition ==
=== Kamen's lava composition ===
The composition of the Kamen volcano reveals much of its lava history. The oldest lava that forms the base of the volcano is mostly made up of a mineral known as olivine which becomes less present in the volcano's rock as you move further up. The top of Kamen has hornblende crystals in some areas with the upper layers containing a large amount of clinopyroxene and plagioclase minerals. Throughout the different slopes and dikes of the volcano, multiple types of basalt and andesite can also be found. Many cinder cones near Kamen are mostly made up of olivine, clinopyroxene, ilmenite, magnetite, and plagioclase. In 2009, researchers examined the wall of a landslide that occurred on Kamen and determined that 80% of the walls’ composition included layered pyroclastic deposits mixed with the dikes. These deposits contained multiple different volcanic materials such as breccias, cinders, and volcanic bombs. The rock deposits which formed this landslide 1,200 years ago contain volcanic breccias, tuff breccias, and pyroclastic materials mixed with sand and clay.

The rocks of Kamen are classified as belonging to the moderate-K subalkaline basalt--andesite-basalt series meaning they have a large amount of potassium and aren't highly alkaline. These volcanic rocks also have a large amount of aluminum and a small amount of magnesium compared to other types, because of the high-alumina, low-magnesium lava consisting of varying levels of porosity and phenocrysts.

The main minerals found in these phenocrysts are olivine, pyroxene, plagioclase, ilmenite, magnetite, and hornblende which can be categorized into 4 different categories:

==== Olivine-bearing rocks ====
These rocks are found throughout the volcanic area, but are most commonly found on Kamen. They are mostly made up of the minerals olivine, twopyroxene, and clinopyroxene.

==== Olivine-free rocks ====
These rocks are only present in the stratovolcano edifice and are mostly made up of the mineral plagioclase, but also contain large amounts of twopyroxene, clinopyroxene, and plagioclase.

==== Sub-aphyric rocks ====
These rocks appear in the flows and explosive materials of smaller volcanic cones. However, they usually don't have any phenocrysts and can contain glass.

==== Hornblende-bearing rocks ====
These rocks are found very rarely across the volcano and are usually made up of hornblende, but can also contain olivine and clinopyroxene.

=== Comparing lava composition with neighboring volcanoes ===
==== Kamen and Ploskie Sopky ====
The rocks from Ploskie Sopky have a significantly different chemical composition to the rocks from Kamen. Ploskie Sopky's rocks have higher levels of potassium and phosphorus while also having lower levels of aluminum and manganese oxide. However, the two volcanos do have a similar mineral composition for mafic materials.

==== Kamen and Klyuchevskoy ====
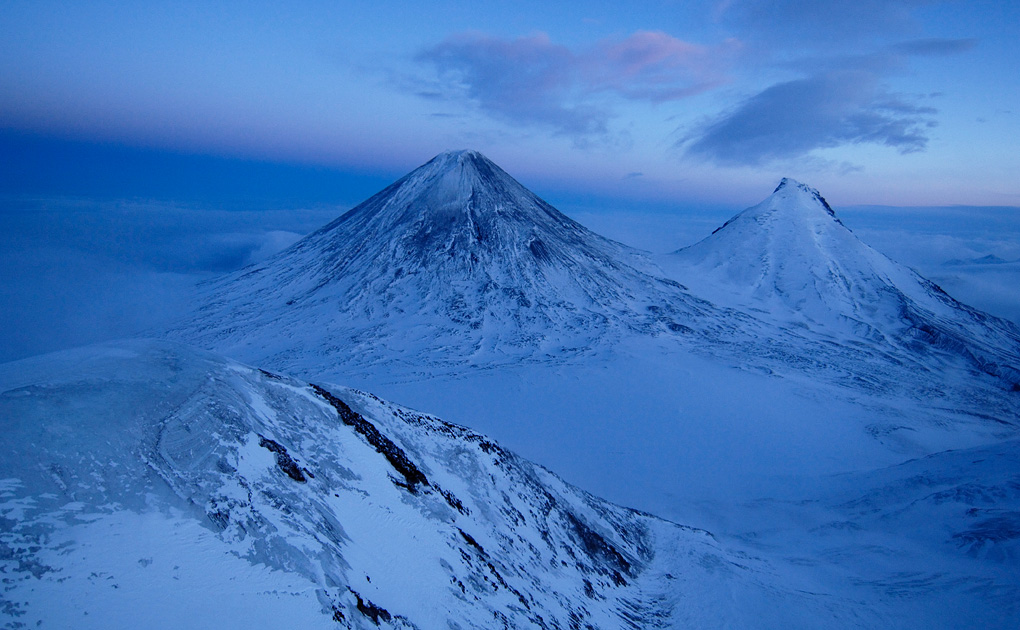
The active stratovolcano Kluchevskaya Sopka along with its dormant neighbor, Kamen.

These volcanoes have similar crystallization trends, since the rocks from Kamen are made up of between 53 and 55% silicon dioxide and Klyuchevskoy contains high-alumina basalt rocks. However, the rock from Kamen has a much slower rate at which magnesium oxide decreases as the silicon dioxide decreases. Another difference is that in the rocks from Klyuchevskoy, titanium increases as they crystallize whereas Kamen rocks decrease in titanium as they crystallize.

Both rock types also show similar major oxide compositions in minerals like olivines and pyroxenes, but they have different amounts of trace elements. The olivines from Kamen have lower ratios of nickel oxide to calcium oxide compared to those from Klyuchevskoy with the pyroxenes from Kamen showing lower ratios of sodium oxide to titanium dioxide as well.

The mineral composition of Kamen's monogenetic cones, which are much different from the rocks found throughout the rest of the volcano, are extremely similar to Klyuchevskoys' moderately magnesian basalt rocks, although Kamen does not have any rocks similar to the high-magnesium basalt rocks found at Klyuchevskoy.

==== Kamen and Bezymianny ====
The rocks from these two volcanoes show a consistent pattern in their mineral compositions. Kamen's lava is more basic, containing lower silica content which include types such as basalts and andesite-basalts. Bezymianny's lava is more acidic, containing a higher silica content, including types like andesite-basalts, andesites, and dacites.

Other differences include:

- Bezymianny mafic minerals contain more iron than those found at Kamen.
- Minerals from Bezymianny contain a higher calcium content than minerals from Kamen.

Both volcanoes contain similar rocks with the mineral hornblende in them.

== See also ==
- Volcanic plateau
- Tuff
- Dike (geology)
- Mafic
- Toreva block
- Breccia
- Bezymianny
- Klyuchevskoy
- Tolbachik
- Kuril Islands
- Pacific plate
- Eurasian plate
- North American plate
