= Gorely =

Volcano on the southern part of the Kamchatka peninsula

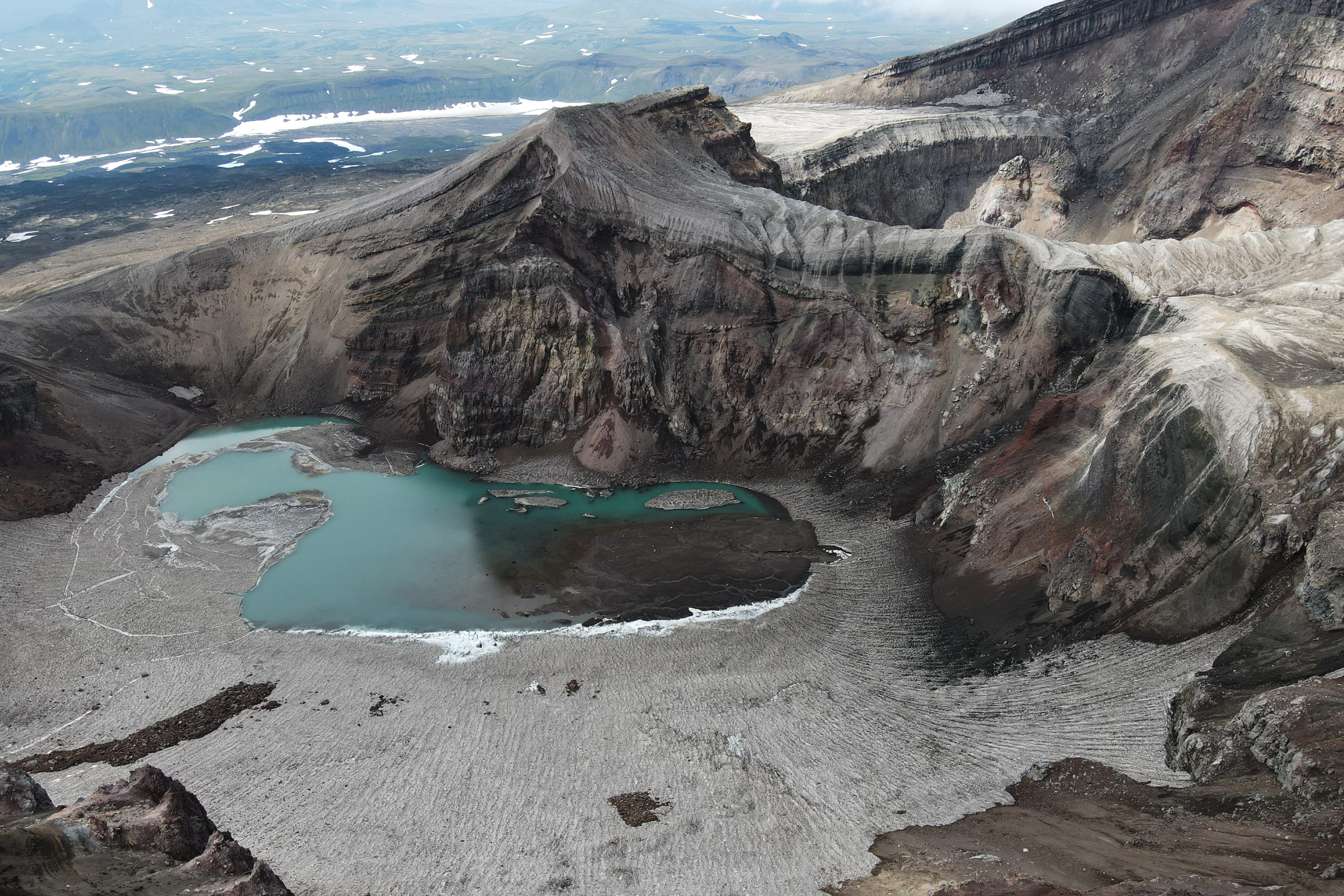
- Volcano Gorely with a turquoise lake, Kamchatka; Photo: Tany Solovey

Highest point
- Elevation: 1,799 m (5,902 ft)
- Coordinates: 52.558°N 158.03°E

Geography
- Location within Kamchatka Krai
- Location: Kamchatka, Russia
- Parent range: Eastern Range

Geology
- Mountain type: Stratovolcanoes
- Last eruption: June 2010

Gorely (Russian: Горелый, literally Burnt) is a volcano located in the southern part of the Kamchatka Peninsula, Russia. It consists of five overlapping stratovolcanoes and is one of the most active in southern Kamchatka.
Gorely is a large, long-lived shield-type volcano that is currently in an eruptive phase. Prior eruptions occurred in 1980-81 and 1984–86.
Several complexes compose the overall volcanic structure:

- ancient Pra-Gorely volcano which measures 20–25 km in diameter;
- a 12 km diameter caldera;
- thick stratum of ignimbrites totaling a volume of 100 km^{3};
- post-caldera eruption cinder cones;
- modern edifice – “Young Gorely” composed of three large superimposed cones and 11 associated craters forming a NW-SE trending intra-caldera ridgeline;
- a complex of 40 modern subsidiary cones on the slopes of “Young Gorely”.

In 2010, activity began to increase, suggesting the volcano was waking up. A new vent was discovered on the inner southeast wall of the crater.

== See also ==
- List of volcanoes in Russia
- Kamchatka Volcanic Eruption Response Team
