= Bezymianny =

Stratovolcano on the Kamchatka peninsula, Russia

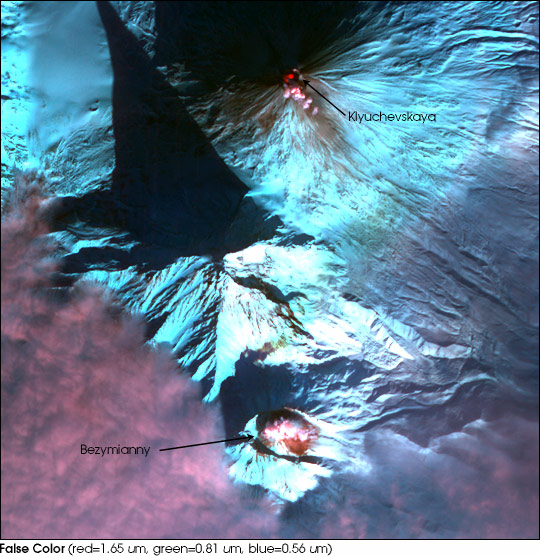
- Kamchatka volcanoes: Klyuchevskaya Sopka (up), Bezymianny (down), both in activity, and the Kamen (middle).

Highest point
- Elevation: 3,020 m (9,910 ft)
- Prominence: 448 m (1,470 ft)
- Coordinates: 55°58′42″N 160°35′12″E

Naming
- Native name: Безымянный (Russian)
- English translation: Nameless

Geography
- Location within Kamchatka Krai
- Location: Kamchatka, Russia
- Parent range: Eastern Range

Geology
- Rock age: 4700 years old
- Mountain type: Stratovolcano
- Volcanic field: Kliuchevskoya Volcanic Group
- Last eruption: April 11, 12, and 13 2023 (ongoing)

Bezymianny (Russian: Безымянный Bezymyannyyi, meaning unnamed) is an active stratovolcano in Kamchatka, Russia. Bezymianny volcano had been considered extinct until 1955. Activity started in 1955, culminating in a dramatic eruption on 30 March 1956. This eruption, similar to the 1980 eruption of Mount St. Helens, produced a large horseshoe-shaped crater that was formed by a sector collapse and an associated lateral blast. Subsequent episodic but ongoing lava dome growth, accompanied by intermittent explosive activity and pyroclastic flows, has largely filled the 1956 crater. The most recent eruption of lava flows occurred in February 2013. An explosive eruption on 20 December 2017 released an ash plume rising to a height of 15 kilometres (49,000 ft) above sea level, which drifted for 320 kilometres (200 mi) NE. The volcano erupted similarly on 28 May 2022, again spewing an ash plume over 15 kilometres (49,000 ft) high. On April 7, 2023, Russia reported Bezymianny had erupted explosively again and the Federal Agency for Air Transport, Rosaviatsiya, issued a Notice to Airmen (NOTAM) and raised the aviation Color Code Red. The eruption formed a column of ash that rose to a height of 12 kilometres (39,000 ft) and was drifting to the southeast slowly. The ash plume stretched out across a distance of 2,000 kilometres (1,200 mi).

The modern Bezymianny volcano, much smaller than its massive neighbors Kamen and Kliuchevskoi, was formed about 4700 years ago over a late-Pleistocene lava-dome complex and an ancestral volcano that was built between about 11,000–7000 years ago. There have been three periods of intensified activity in the past 3000 years.

== Gallery ==
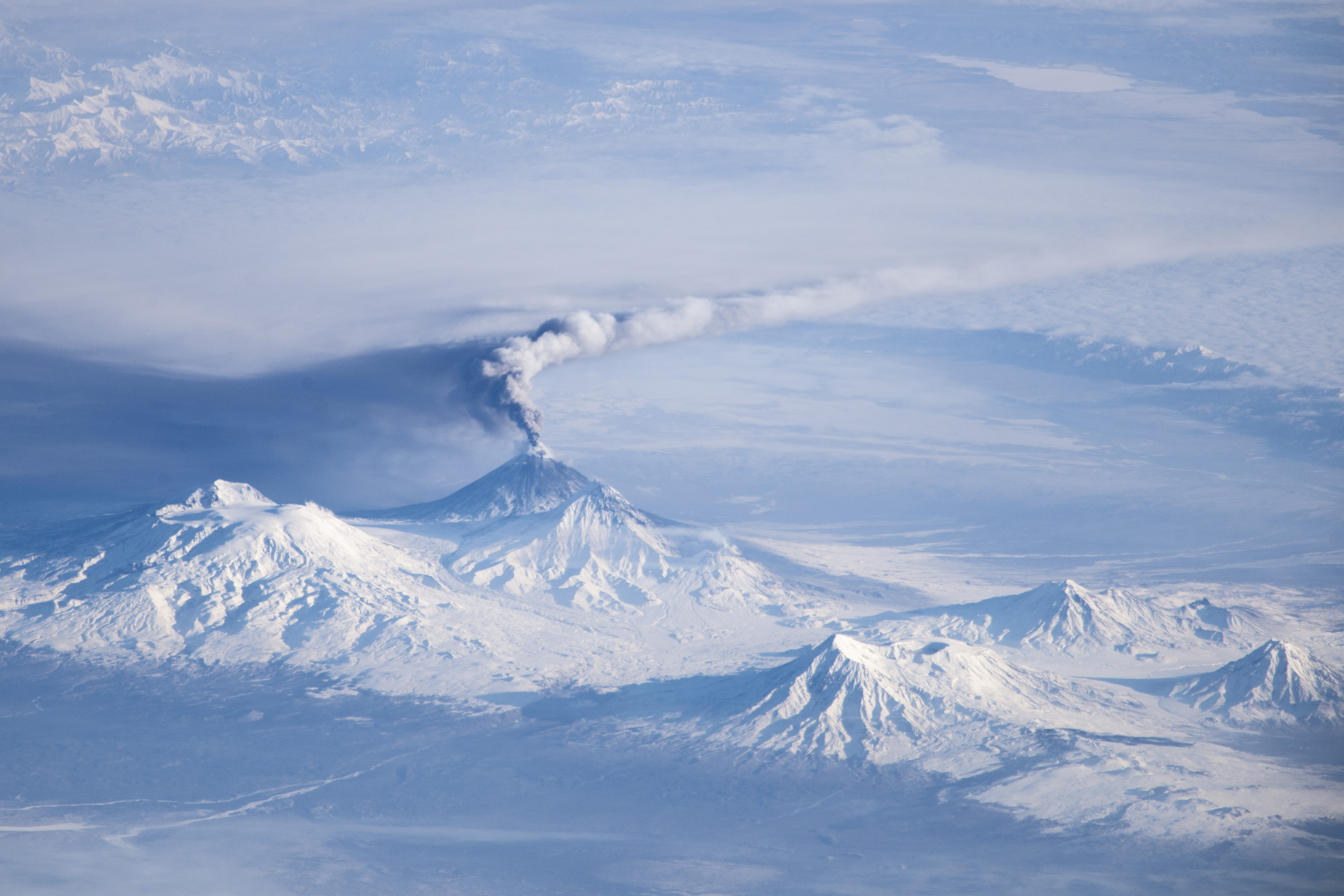
Annotated view includes Ushkovsky, Tolbachik, Bezymianny, Zimina, and Udina. Oblique view taken on 16 November 2013 from ISS. Bezymianny can be seen second from the right. A small plume of "smoke" can be seen.

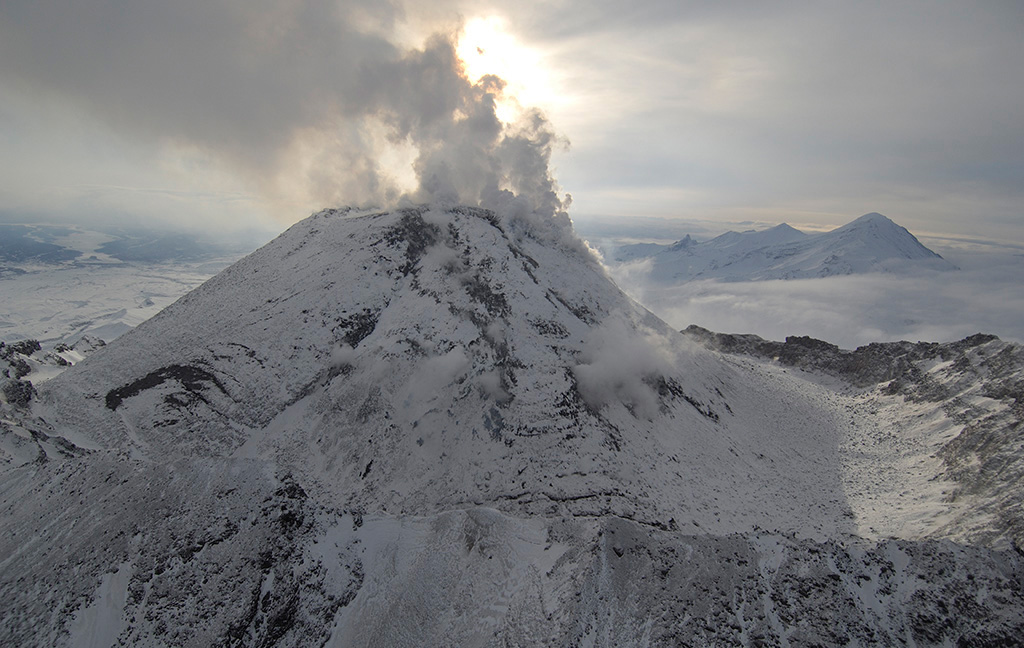

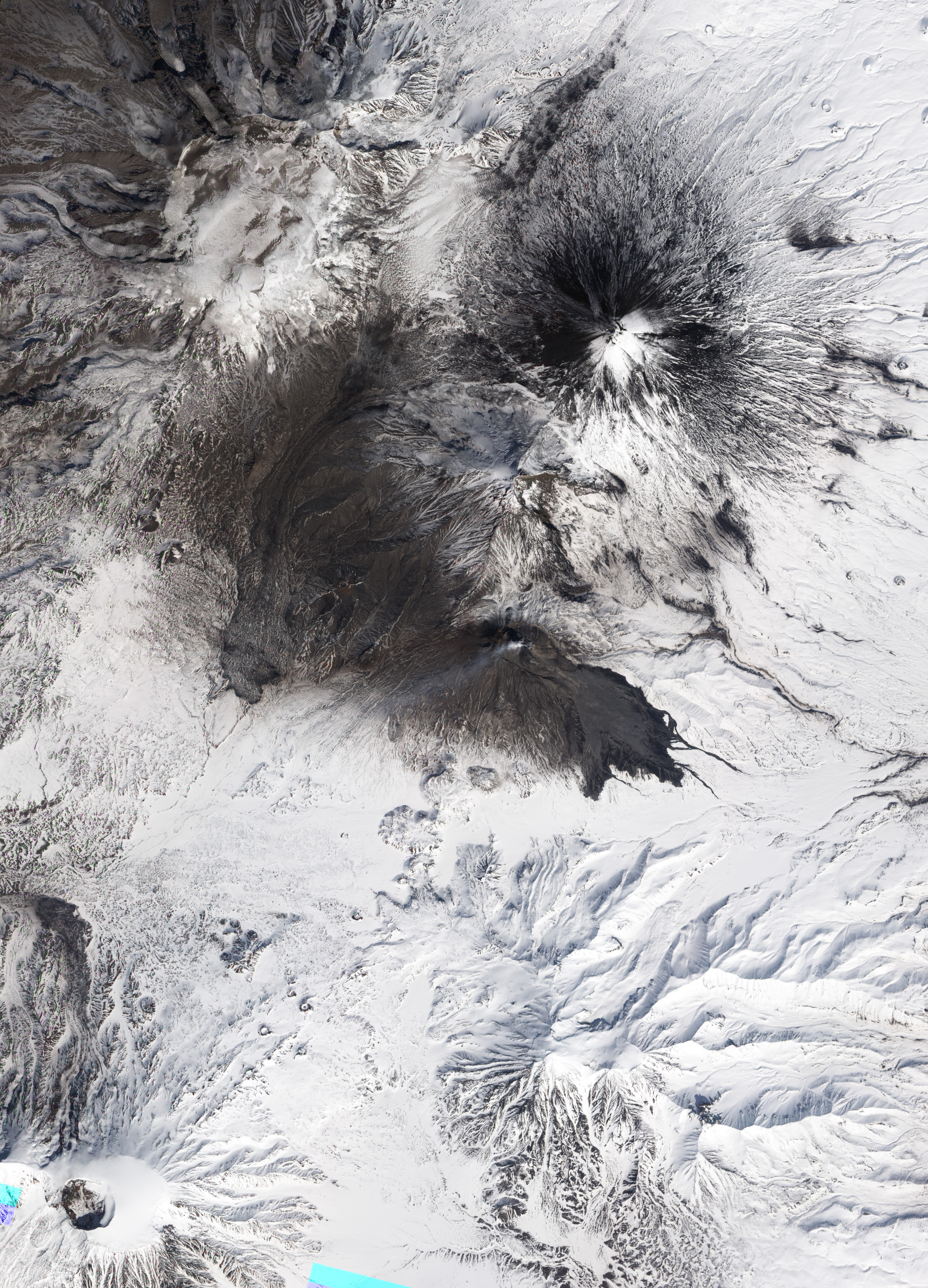
Natural-colour satellite image showing evidence of an eruption at the volcano.

== See also ==
- List of volcanoes in Russia
- Kamchatka Volcanic Eruption Response Team
