= Kizimen =

Volcano in Russia

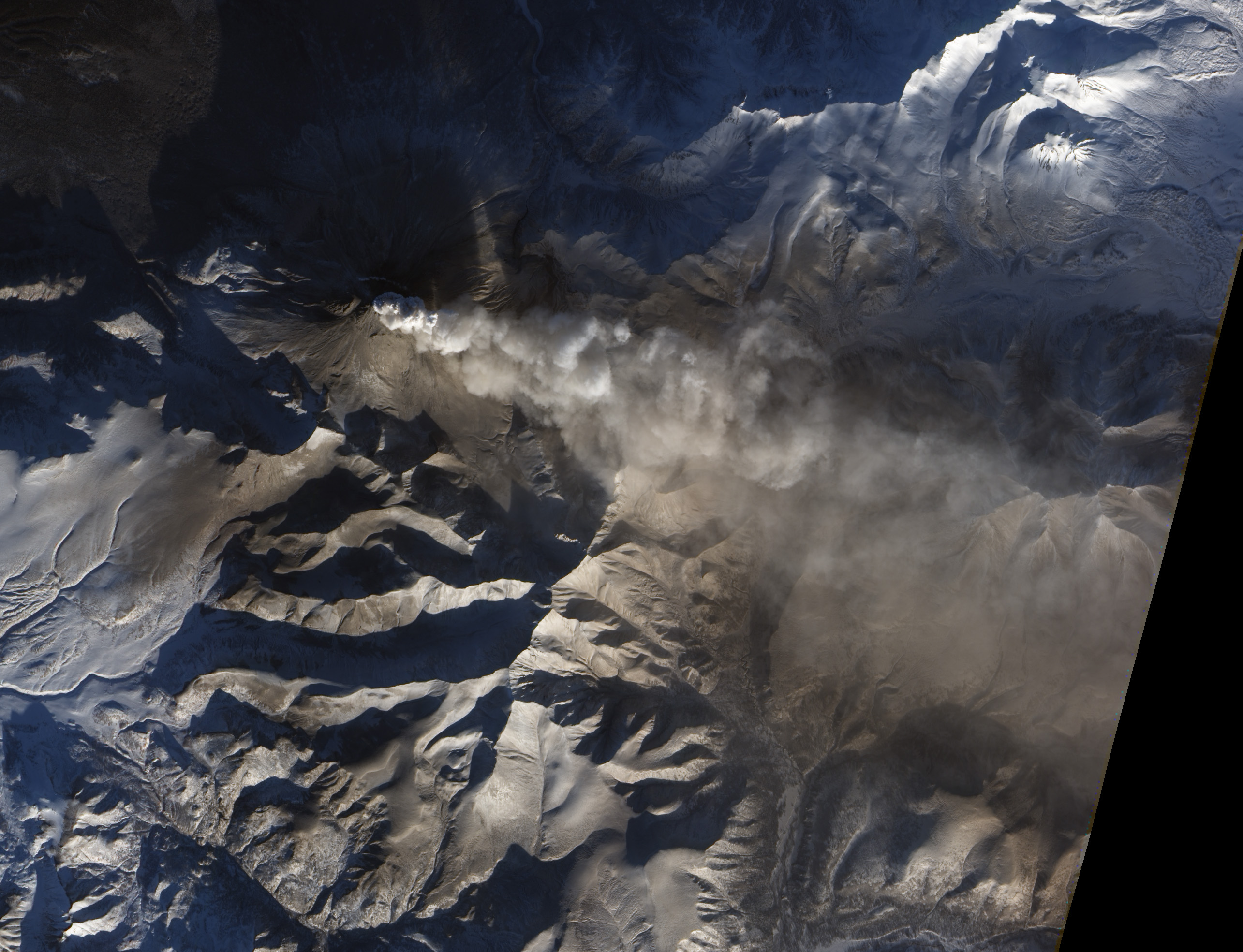
- Kizimen Volcano Russia, 6 January 2011

Highest point
- Elevation: 2,334 m (7,657 ft)
- Prominence: 1,489 m (4,885 ft)
- Coordinates: 55°07′51″N 160°19′12″E

Geography
- Location within Kamchatka Krai
- Location: Kamchatka, Russia
- Parent range: Eastern Range

Geology
- Mountain type: Stratovolcano
- Last eruption: 2010 to 2013

Kizimen (Russian: Кизимен) is an active stratovolcano in the southern part of Kamchatka Peninsula, Russia.

The volcano was in a dormant state since an eruption in 1929, but on 2 September 2009 it was reported by Georgina Cooper for the Reuters news agency that the crater lake temperature had risen 10 degrees Celsius in a week and plumes of steam were rising from its flanks. The activity continued throughout 2010, with the formation of new fumaroles reported in November. Seismic activity and ash emission continued to build over the following weeks, and in January 2011 a hotspot was recorded, indicating the presence of lava. In early February 2011 the volcano sent a column of ash several kilometres high.

In April 2011, it was reported that the volcanic activity and ash were threatening the endangered wild reindeer of the area.

On 31 December 2012, following a 24-hour period of some 357 earthquakes reported under the volcano, Kizimen was raised to 'orange alert' status. An eruption was reported on 10 January 2013, with the ash plume reaching 4,200 m (13,800 ft) altitude.

On December 7, 2013 activity at Kizimen and nearby Kliuchevskoi significantly increased, continued during November 29 - December 7, prompting KVERT to raise the Alert Level to Red. Ash plumes rose to altitudes of 5.5–6 km (18,000-19,700 ft) a.s.l. and drifted more than 212 km NE and over 1,000 km E. According to a news article, a warning to aircraft was issued for the area around the volcanoes. Video showed gas-and-steam activity, and satellite images detected a daily weak thermal anomaly. On December 9, the Alert Level was lowered to Green when the eruptions stopped.

The volcano is not well understood, and research has indicated that the volcano could erupt in a similar fashion to the famous 1980 eruption of Mount St. Helens.

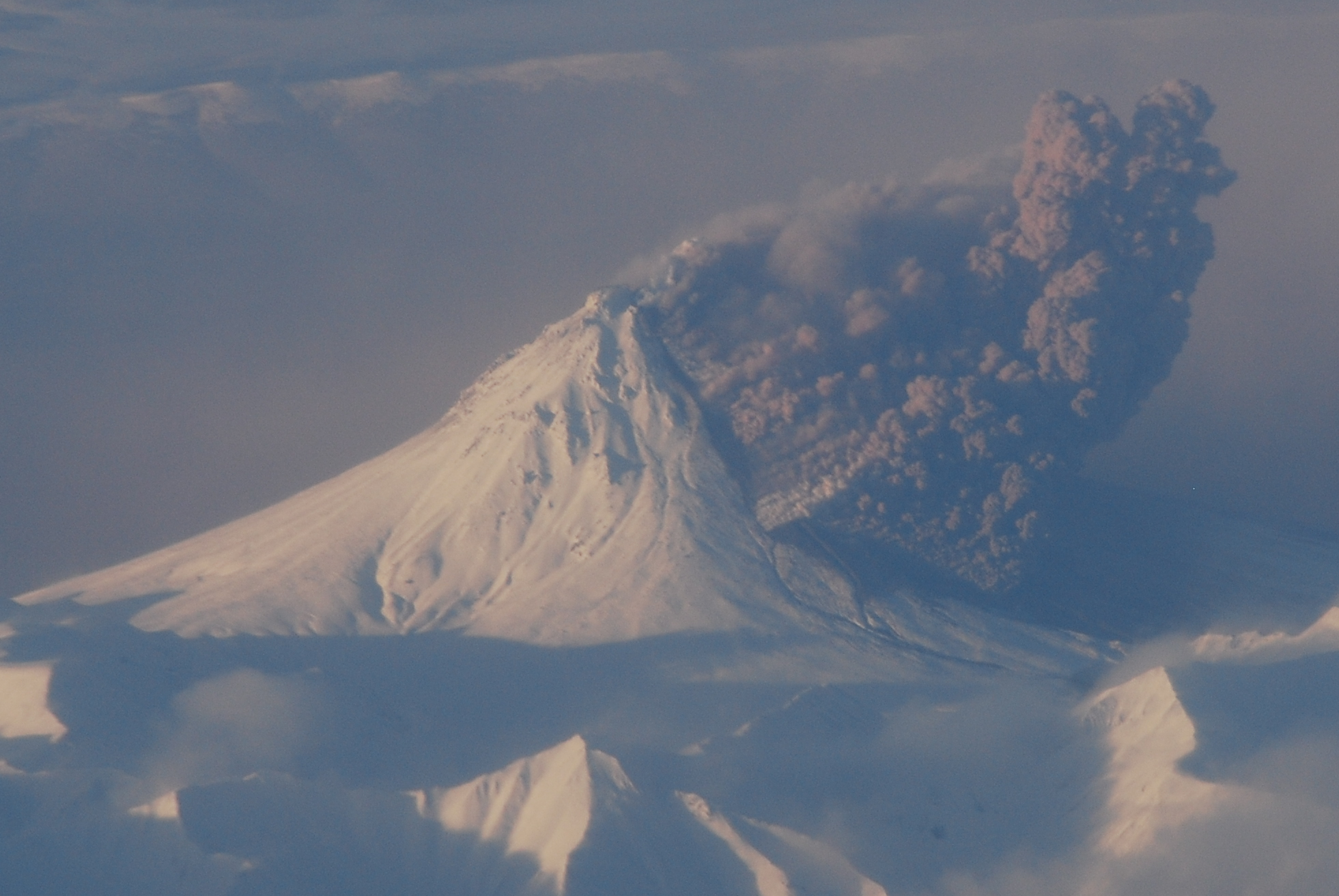
Pyroclastic flow eruption of Kizimen in December 2010

== See also ==
- List of volcanoes in Russia
- List of ultras of Northeast Asia

== Sources ==
- "Kizimen". Global Volcanism Program. Smithsonian Institution.
- "Kizimen V., Russia". Peakbagger.com.
