= Klyuchevsky (inhabited locality) =

Klyuchevsky (Russian: Ключевский; masculine), Klyuchevskaya (Ключевская; feminine), or Klyuchevskoye (Ключевское; neuter) is the name of several inhabited localities in Russia:

Urban localities

- Klyuchevsky, Zabaykalsky Krai, an urban-type settlement in Mogochinsky District of Zabaykalsky Krai

Rural localities

- Klyuchevsky, Kirov Oblast, a pochinok in Shabalinsky District of Kirov Oblast
- Klyuchevskaya (rural locality), a village in Afanasyevsky District of Kirov Oblast
- Klyuchevskoye, name of several rural localities
