= Ushkovsky =

Volcanic massif in Kamchatka, Russia

Highest point
- Elevation: 3,943 m (12,936 ft)
- Prominence: 451 m (1,480 ft)
- Coordinates: 56.070°N 160.470°E

Geography
- Location: Kamchatka, Russia

Geology
- Mountain type: Compound volcano
- Last eruption: April 1890

Ushkovsky (Russian: Ушковский, formerly known as Plosky) is a large volcanic massif located in the central part of the Kamchatka Peninsula, Russia. It is located at the northwestern end of the Klyuchevskaya Sopka volcano group. These volcanoes are also set in a chain linked formation. The highest peak of this massif is Krestovsky (4108 m). Krestovsky is a stratovolcano, Ushkovsky is a shield volcano.

== View ==
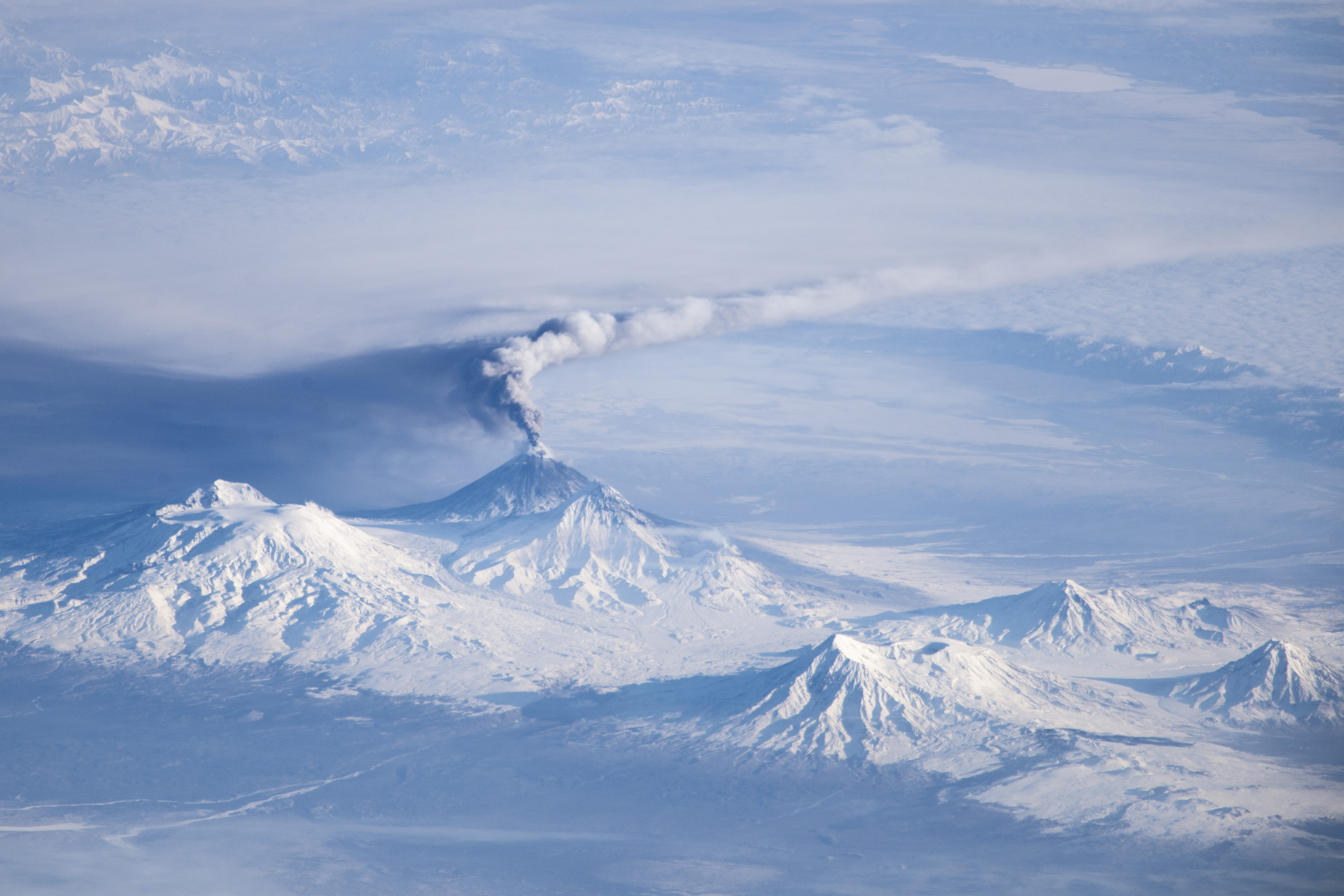
Annotated view includes Ushkovsky, Tolbachik, Bezymianny, Zimina, and Udina. Oblique view taken on November 16, 2013, from ISS.

== See also ==
- List of volcanoes in Russia
