= Udina =

Volcanic massif

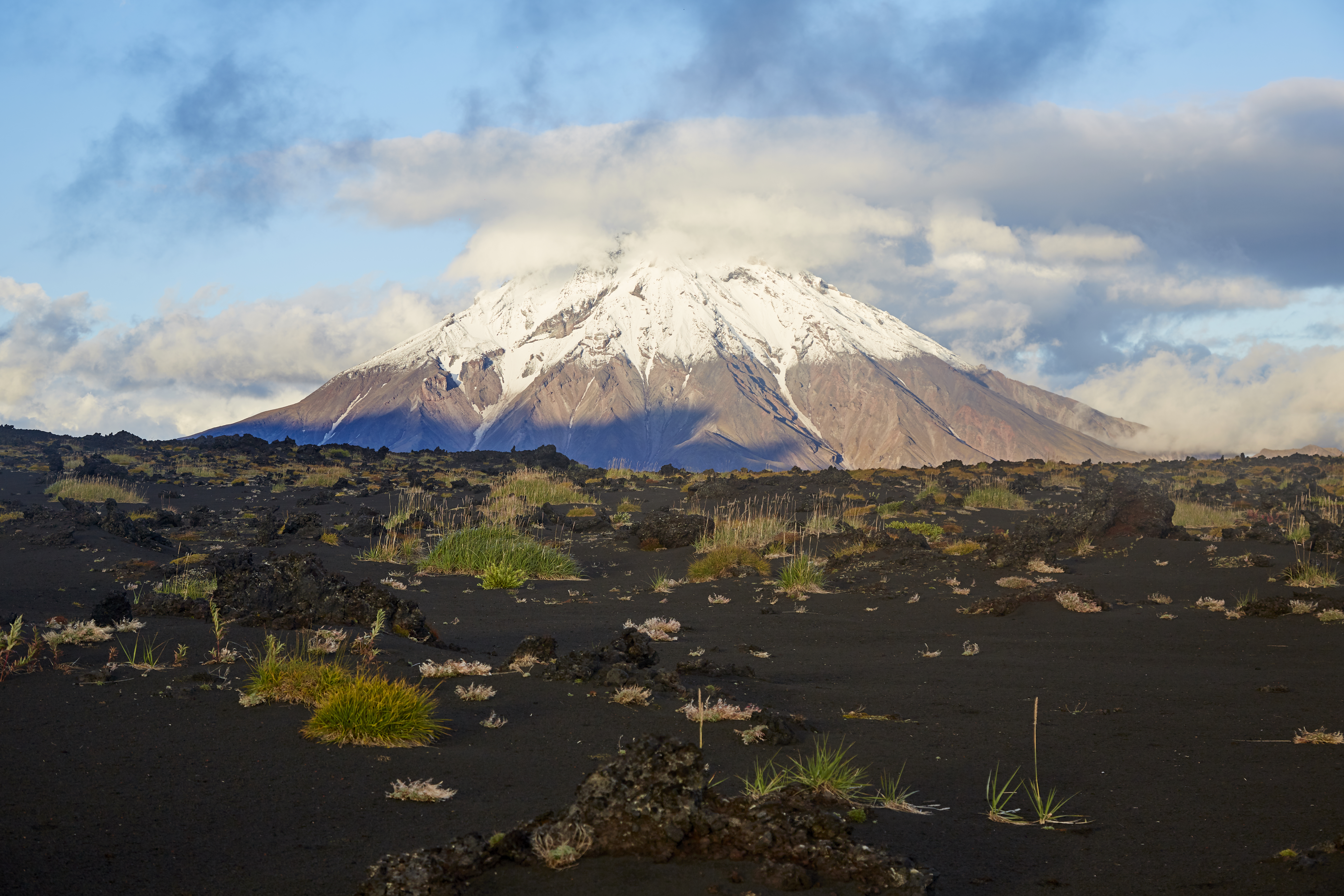
- in 2020

Highest point
- Elevation: 2,920 m (9,580 ft)
- Prominence: 1,630 m (5,350 ft)
- Listing: Ultra
- Coordinates: 55°45′30″N 160°31′36″E

Geography
- Location within Russia
- Location: Kamchatka, Russia
- Parent range: Eastern Range

Geology
- Mountain type: Stratovolcanoes
- Last eruption: Unknown

Udina (Russian: Удина) is a volcanic massif located in the central part of the Kamchatka Peninsula, Russia. It comprises two distinct conical stratovolcanoes: Bolshaya Udina, standing at 2,920 meters, and Malaya Udina, with a height of 1,945 meters.

Malaya Udina, the smaller of the two, is a basaltic volcano located at the eastern end of the complex, rising above a low saddle. Its flanks are dotted with small lava domes, characteristic of its formation. This volcano is part of the Volcanoes of Kamchatka, a UNESCO World Heritage site, recognized for its geological significance and natural beauty.

Bolshaya Udina, the larger and western volcano, is composed primarily of andesitic rock and features a prominent lava dome on its southwestern flank. Although it was long considered extinct, Bolshaya Udina surprised the scientific community when it exhibited signs of seismic activity, leading to its reclassification as an 'active' volcano in June 2019. This reawakening has drawn attention to the potential hazards associated with the volcano, as well as the dynamic nature of the region's volcanic activity.

== View ==
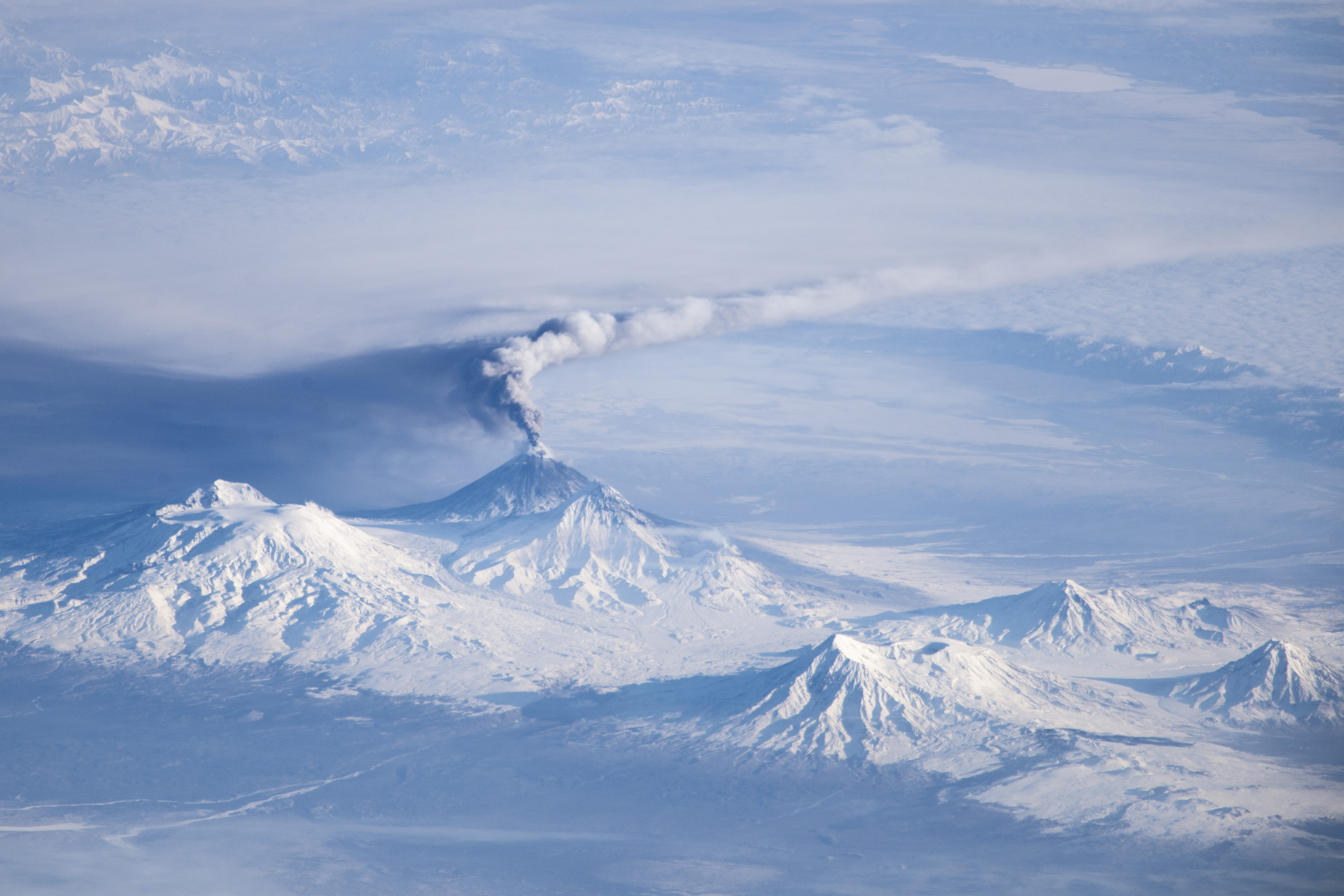
Annotated view includes Ushkovsky, Tolbachik, Bezymianny, Zimina, and Udina. Oblique view taken on November 16, 2013 from ISS.

== See also ==
- List of volcanoes in Russia
- List of ultras of Northeast Asia
