= Zimina (volcano) =

Stratovolcano in Russia

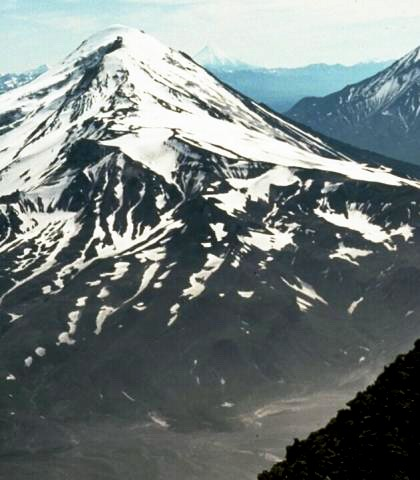
- Ovalnaya Zimina seen from Bezymianny

Highest point
- Elevation: 3,080 m (10,100 ft)
- Prominence: 1,570 m (5,150 ft)
- Listing: Ultra, Ribu
- Coordinates: 55°51′39″N 160°36′21″E

Geography
- Location within Russia
- Location: Kamchatka, Russia
- Parent range: Eastern Range

Geology
- Mountain type: Stratovolcanoes
- Last eruption: Unknown

Zimina volcano (Russian: Вулкан Зимина) or Zimin is a stratovolcano located in the central part of the Kamchatka Peninsula, Russia. It comprises two peaks: Ovalnaya Zimina and Ostraya Zimina.

== View ==
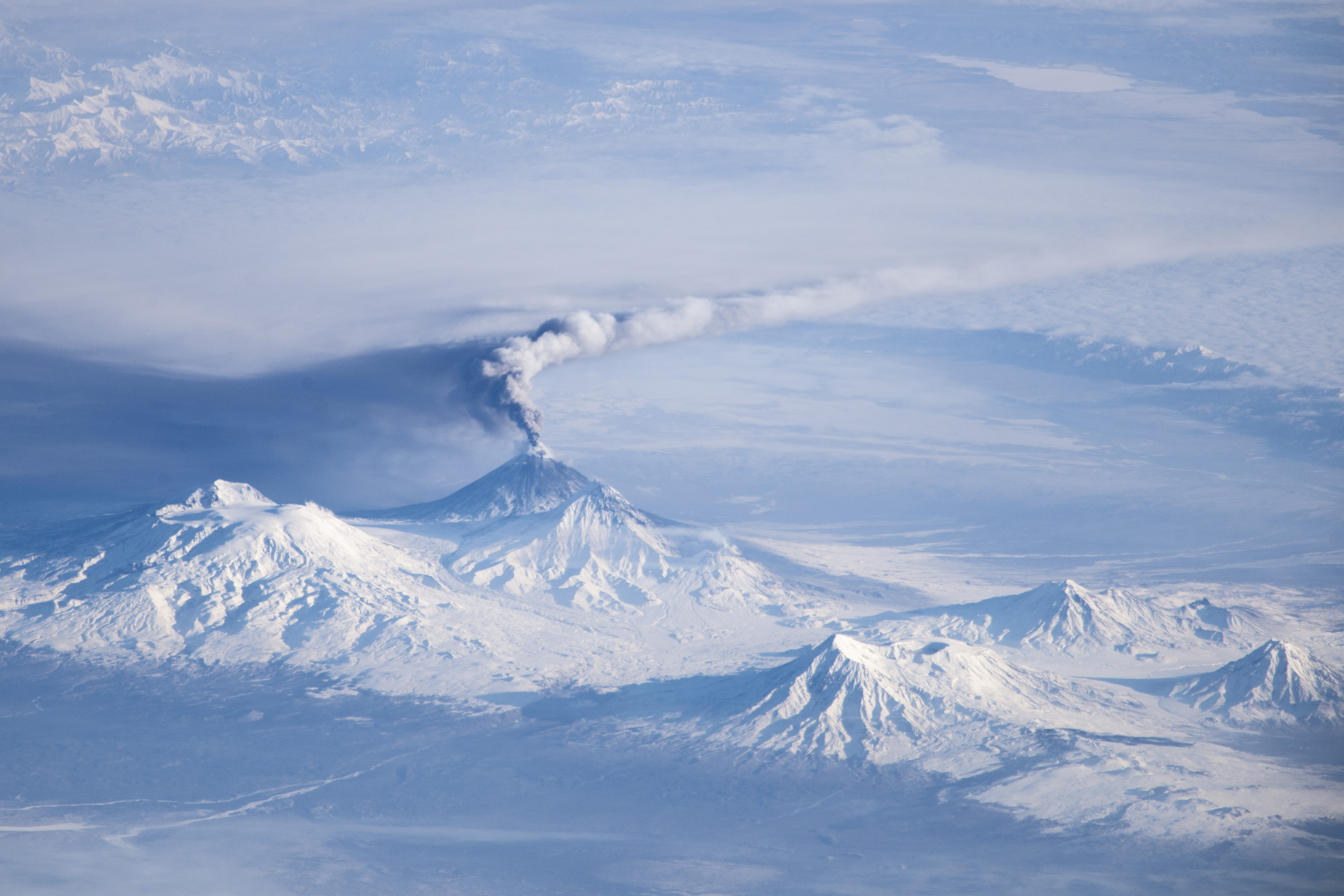
Annotated view includes Ushkovsky, Tolbachik, Bezymianny, Zimina, and Udina. Oblique view taken on November 16, 2013 from ISS.

== See also ==
- List of volcanoes in Russia
- List of ultras of Northeast Asia

== Sources ==
- "Zimina". Global Volcanism Program. Smithsonian Institution.
- "Gora Oval'naya Zimina, Russia". Peakbagger.com.
