= Tolbachik =

Volcano in eastern Russia

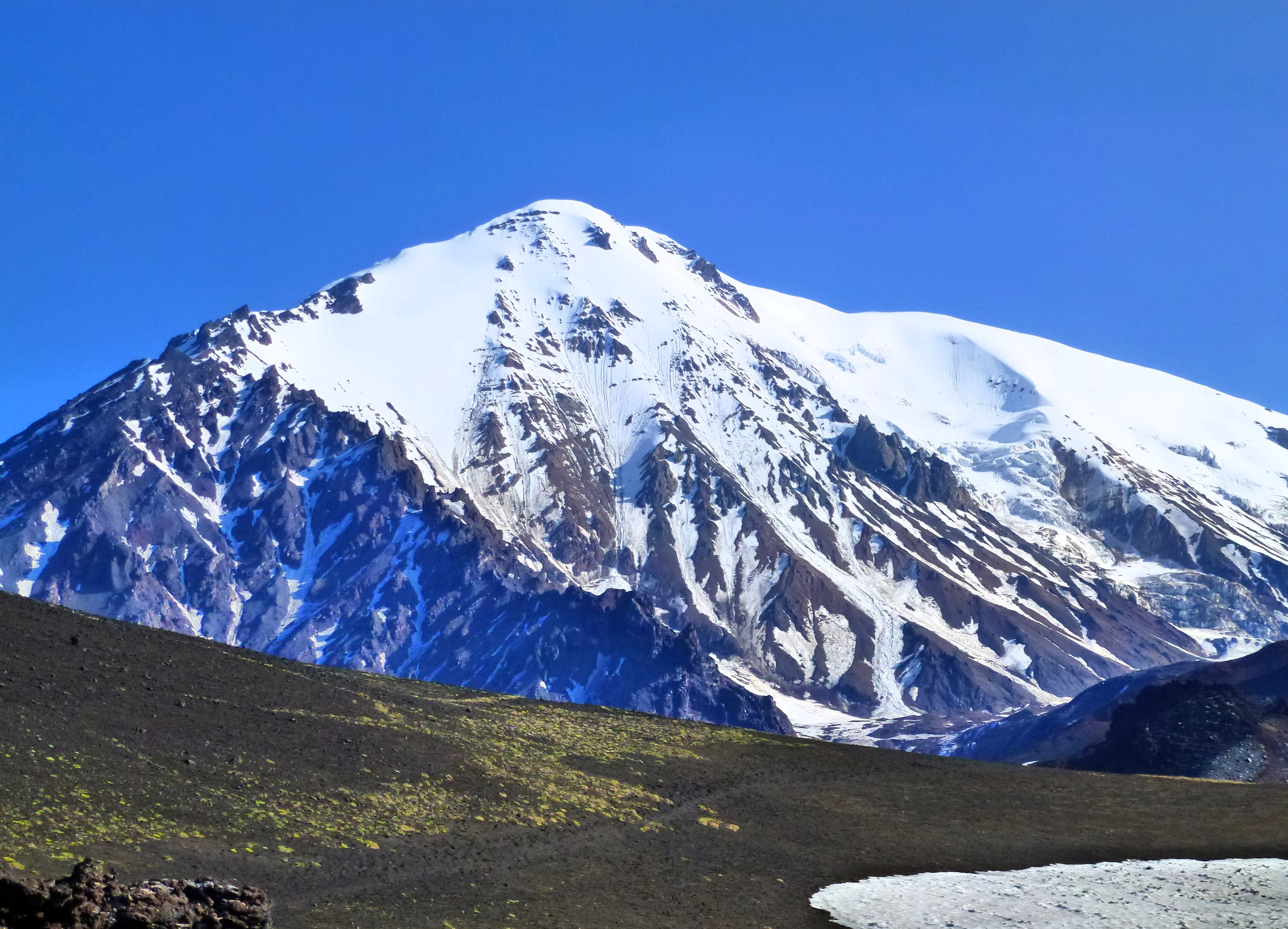
- Ostry Tolbachik from Southwest

Highest point
- Elevation: 3,672 m (12,047 ft)
- Prominence: 2,190 m (7,190 ft)
- Listing: Ultra, Ribu
- Coordinates: 55°49′51″N 160°19′33″E

Geography
- Location within Russia
- Location: Kamchatka, Russia
- Parent range: Eastern Range

Geology
- Mountain type(s): Shield volcano and stratovolcano
- Last eruption: 2012 to 2013

Climbing
- Easiest route: basic rock/snow climb

Tolbachik (or Tolbachyk) (Russian: Толбачик) is a volcanic complex on the Kamchatka Peninsula in the far east of Russia. It consists of two volcanoes, Plosky (flat) Tolbachik (3,085 m) and Ostry (sharp) Tolbachik (3,672 m), which as the names suggest are respectively a flat-topped shield volcano and a peaked stratovolcano. As Ostry is the mountain's highest point, the entire mountain is often referred to as "Ostry Tolbachik", not to be confused with Ostry, a separate volcano to the north also on the Kamchatka Peninsula.

== Activity ==
Its eruptive history stretches back thousands of years, but the most notable eruption occurred in 1975, commonly known as "The Great Tolbachik Fissure Eruption". It was preceded by an earthquake swarm, which led to a successful prediction of the eruption by scientists from the Russian Institute of Volcanology. The eruption created several new cinder cones and, in terms of volume of lava emitted, was Kamchatka's largest basaltic eruption in historic times.

On November 27, 2012 a strombolian type eruption started from two fissures. Basaltic lava flows move relatively fast, and quickly flooded buildings 4 km away. The eruption continued for more than a month, as lava continued to flow from the fissures. Lava flowed up to 20 kilometers (12 miles) from the line of fissures on the volcano's southern flank. According to the Kamchatka Volcanic Eruption Response Team, the eruption ended September 15, 2013. Several lava caves were formed as a result of the 2012–2013 eruption.

== Mineralogy ==
The fumarole deposits of Tolbachik are rich in exotic minerals and, as of September 2017, 100 new minerals have been first described here including alarsite and tolbachite.

== Views ==
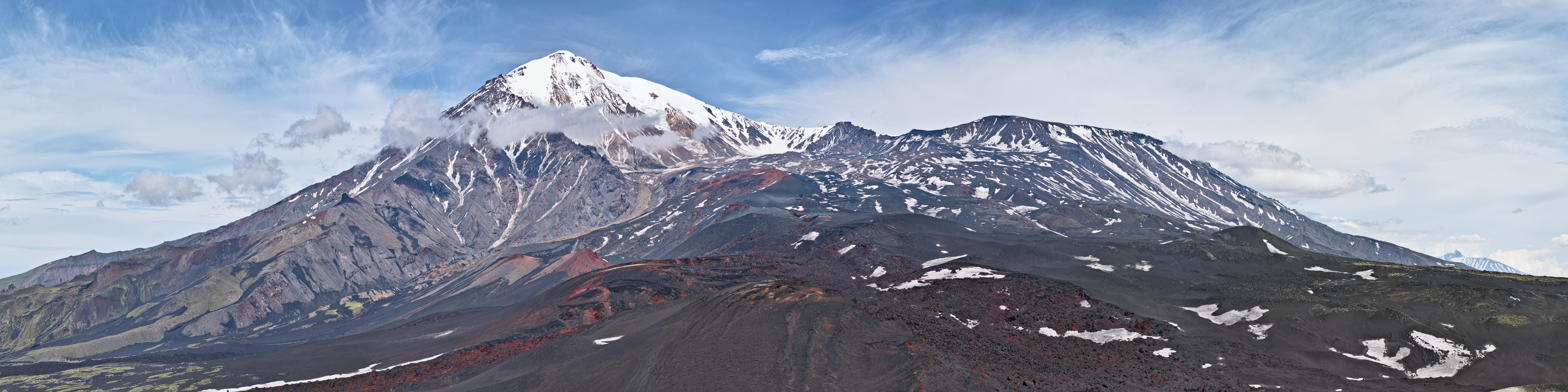
Ostry Tolbachik (left) and Plosky Tolbachik (right) from the south-southwest, taken on July 26, 2015

360° panorama on top of a cinder cone from the 1975 eruption. The peak of Ostry Tolbachik can be found in the clouds on the right.

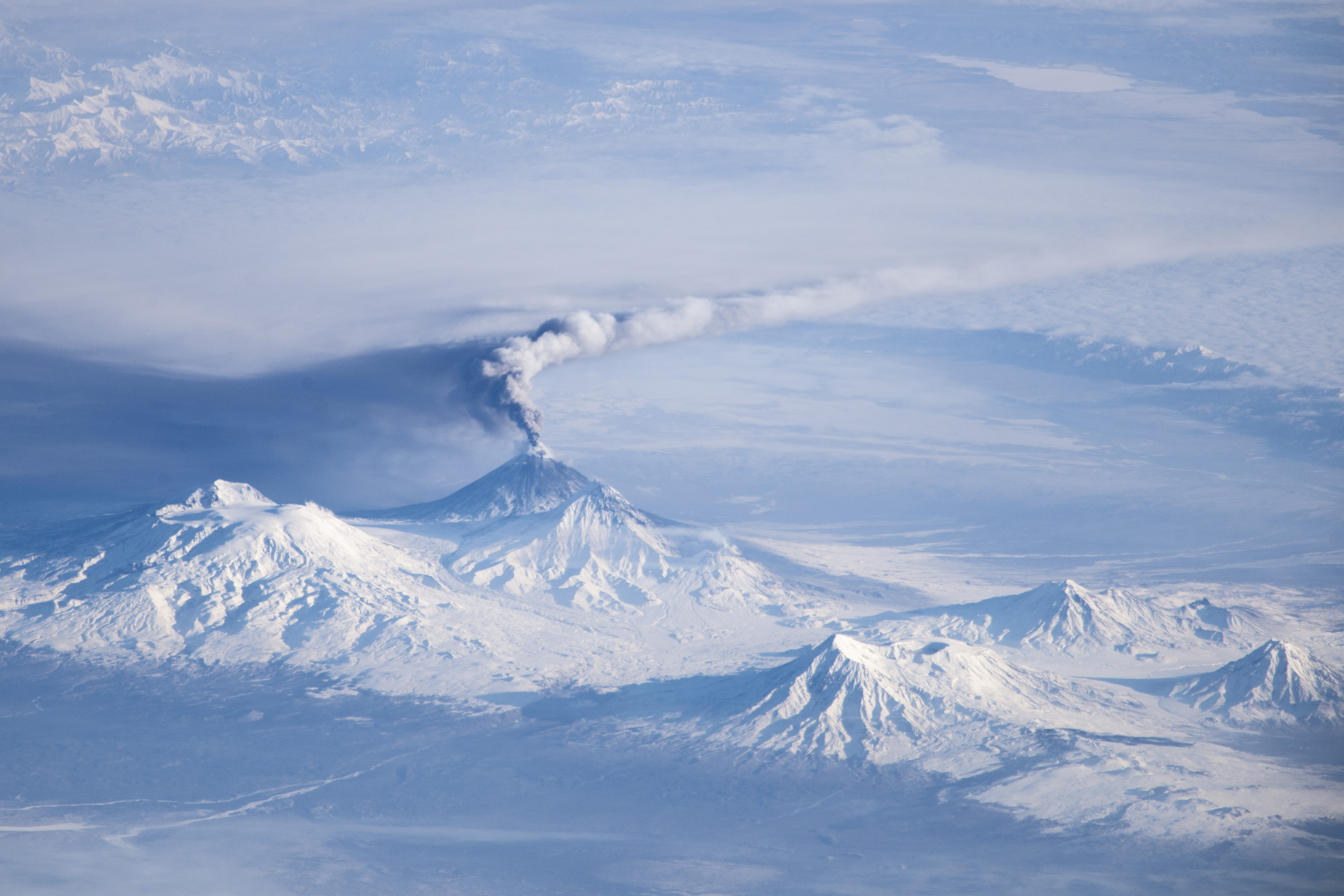
Tolbachik (third from right) with Klyuchevskoi erupting in the background. Adjacent volcanoes are Ushkovsky, Bezymianny, Zimina, and Udina. Oblique view taken on November 16, 2013 from ISS.

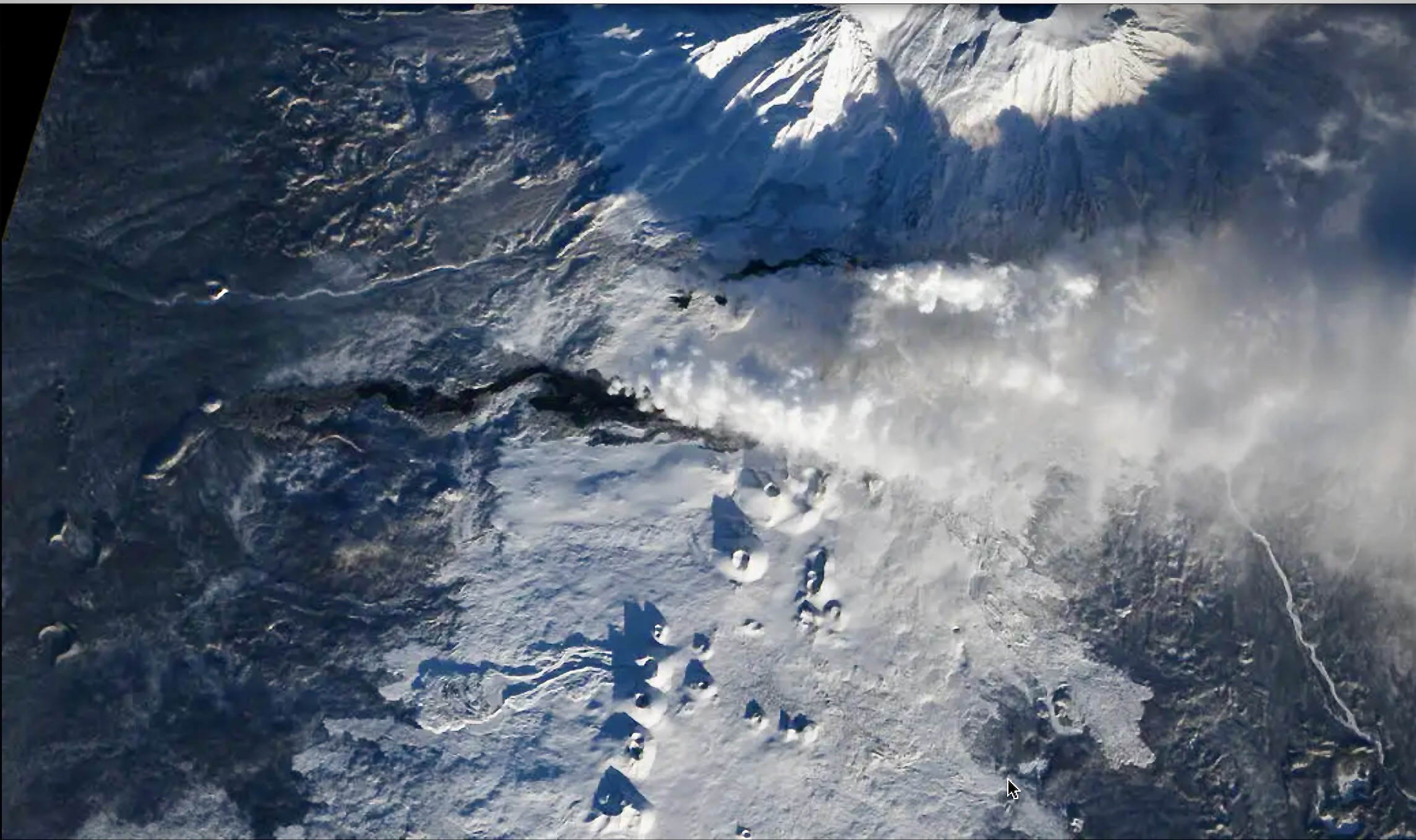
Erupting Fissure at Tolbachik, Kamchatka, Dec. 22, 2012. Imaged by the Advanced Land Imager (ALI) on the Earth Observing-1 (EO-1) Satellite.

== See also ==
- List of volcanoes in Russia
- List of ultras of Northeast Asia
- Kamchatka Volcanic Eruption Response Team

== Other references ==
- "Tolbachik". Global Volcanism Program. Smithsonian Institution.
- Plosky Tolbachik volcano and Tolbachik lava field
- Fedotov S.A. and Markhinin Ye.K. (Eds) (1983). The Great Tolbachik Fissure Eruption: Geological and Geophysical Data, 1975-1976. Cambridge University Press, 341 p. ISBN 0-521-24345-9
- "Fireworks" on Tolbachik - may 2013 on author's project website: "Russia Begins Here"
