= Robert Landsburg =

American photographer (1931–1980)

- Born: Robert Emerson Landsburg; November 13, 1931; Seattle, Washington, U.S.
- Died: May 18, 1980 (aged 48) near Mount St. Helens, Washington, U.S.
- Cause of death: Killed by a pyroclastic flow caused by the 1980 eruption of Mount St. Helens
- Body discovered: June 4, 1980
- Resting place: Skyline Memorial Gardens, Portland, Oregon, U.S.
- Occupation: Photographer
- Known for: Photographing the 1980 eruption of Mount St. Helens
- Military career
- Allegiance: United States
- Branch: United States Navy
- Service years: 1951–1959
- Conflicts: Korean War

Robert Emerson Landsburg (November 13, 1931 – May 18, 1980) was an American photographer who died while photographing the 1980 eruption of Mount St. Helens.

== Biography ==
Landsburg was born in 1931 in Seattle, Washington. He served in the U.S. Navy from 1951 through 1959, partially during the Korean War. He was working as a commercial photographer by 1970, winning an award that year for best travel film by a travel promotion association, given by Sunset magazine. As of 1978, his photography work could be seen in 16 public buildings in Portland, Oregon.

In the weeks leading up to the eruption of Mount St. Helens, Landsburg visited the area many times in order to photographically document the changing volcano. On the morning of May 18, 1980, he was within a few miles of the summit. When the mountain erupted, Landsburg retreated to his car while taking photos of the rapidly approaching ash cloud. Before he was engulfed by the pyroclastic flow, he rewound the film back into its case, put his camera in his backpack, and then laid himself on top of the backpack to protect its contents. His body was found 17 days later, buried in the ash with his backpack underneath. The film was developed and has provided geologists with valuable documentation of the historic eruption.

Landsburg was a resident of Portland at the time of his death. He was interred at Skyline Memorial Gardens in Portland.

== See also ==
- Reid Blackburn
- List of volcanic eruption deaths
