= Reid Blackburn =

American photographer (1952–1980)

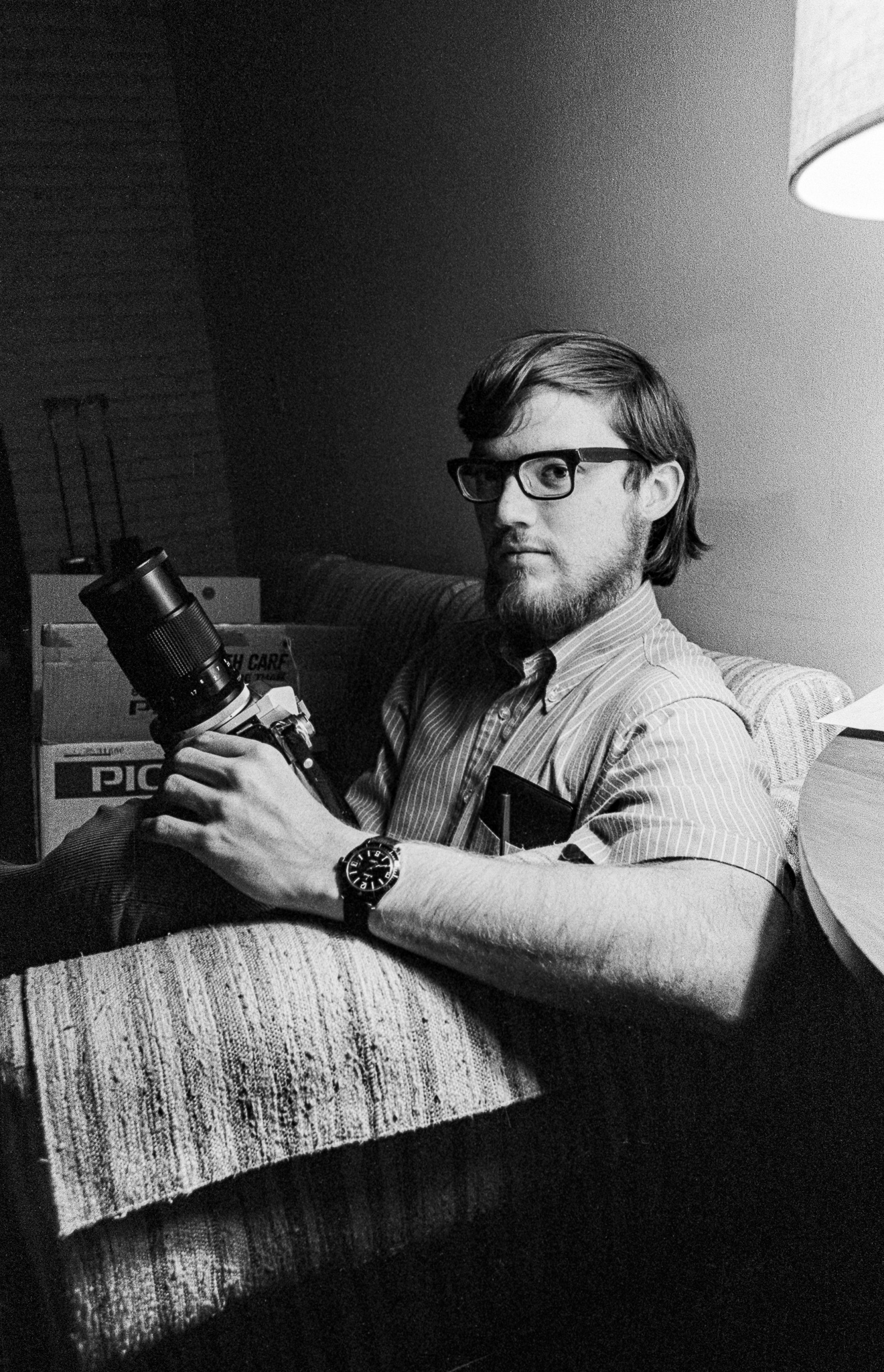
- Reid Blackburn, picture taken 1970–1971
- Born: August 11, 1952; Washington, D.C., U.S.
- Died: May 18, 1980 (aged 27) near Mount St. Helens, Washington, U.S.
- Cause of death: Killed by a pyroclastic flow caused by the 1980 eruption of Mount St. Helens
- Body discovered: May 22, 1980
- Occupation: Photographer

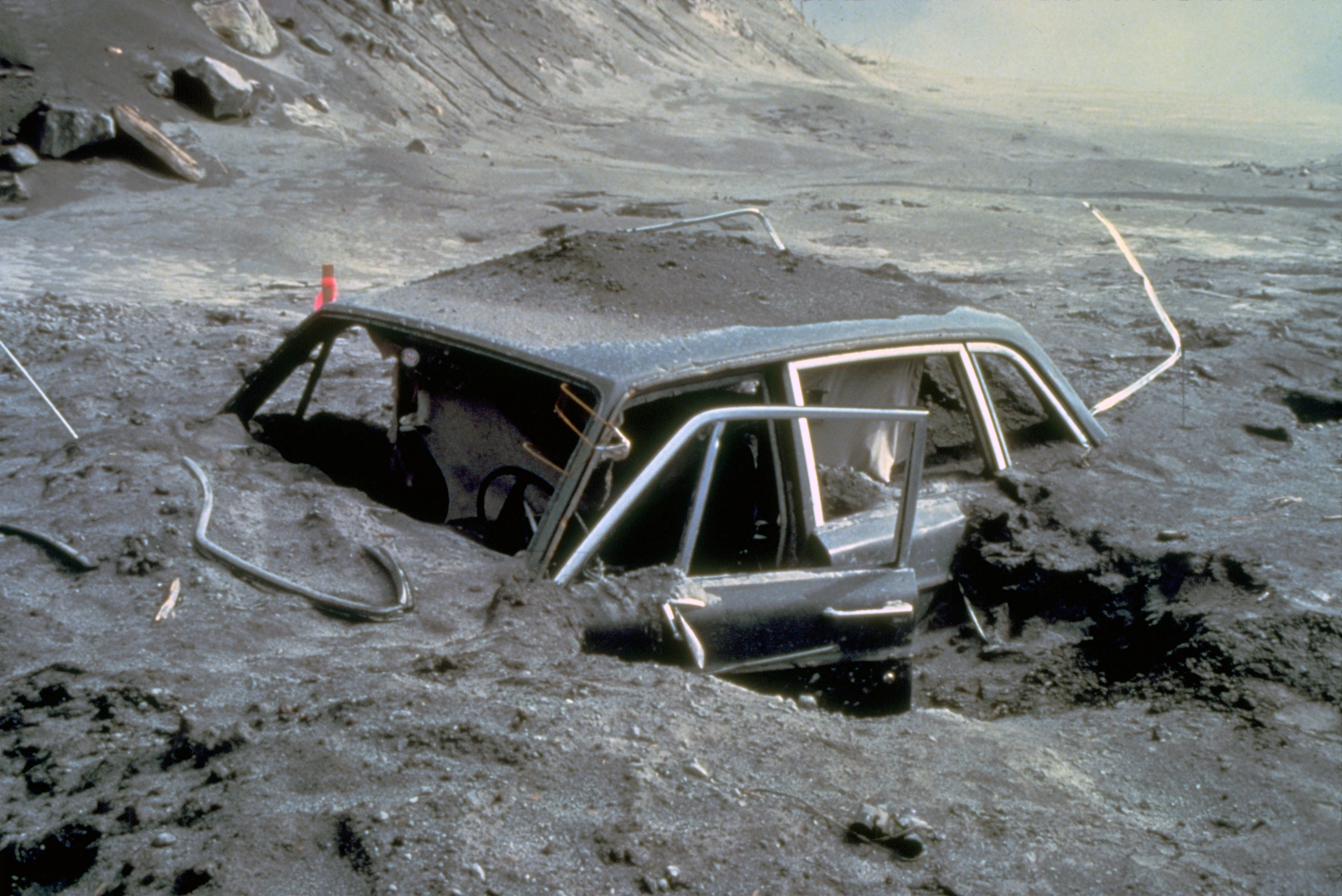
Blackburn's Volvo 144 after the eruption

Reid Turner Blackburn (August 11, 1952 – May 18, 1980) was an American photographer killed in the 1980 volcanic eruption of Mount St. Helens. A photojournalist covering the eruption for a local newspaper—the Vancouver, Washington, The Columbian—as well as National Geographic magazine and the United States Geological Survey, he was caught at Coldwater Camp in the blast.

Blackburn's car and body were found four days after the eruption. His camera, buried under the debris of the eruption, was found roughly one week later.

After his death, Blackburn was praised by his coworkers and friends alike. They spoke of his talent and enthusiasm, as well as his sometimes "acerbic" sense of humor. His wife, Fay, concluded that he had died doing what he loved.

== Life ==
Blackburn was born in 1952, the son of an engineer who possessed "a fixation on figuring out the way things worked". He loved the idea of photography, once equating it to "painting with light". He was an accomplished photographer, and had received accolades from the Associated Press for his photographs. Blackburn also authored a book on outboard hydroplane racing.

Blackburn attended Linfield College in McMinnville, Oregon. He began working at The Columbian newspaper in 1975 as a photojournalist. It was there that he met his wife, Fay Mall, who worked in the newspaper's display advertising department. The two dated for several months before marrying in the summer of 1979. Blackburn enjoyed hiking and loved the outdoors.

== Assignment at Mount St. Helens ==
According to coworker and photo editor Steve Small, St. Helens was Blackburn's favorite mountain. They climbed it together several times, and referred to it as "the Sleeping Beauty of the Northwest."

Blackburn first became interested in the possibility of an eruption at Mount St. Helens in March 1980, when a series of earthquakes rocked the volcano. Having already climbed the mountain, he was intrigued by the situation and was eventually assigned to document the activity of the volcano due to his outdoor skills and his meticulousness. By May, he had begun camping out at the volcano as a joint project to take pictures of the volcanic phenomena for The Columbian, National Geographic, and the United States Geological Survey.

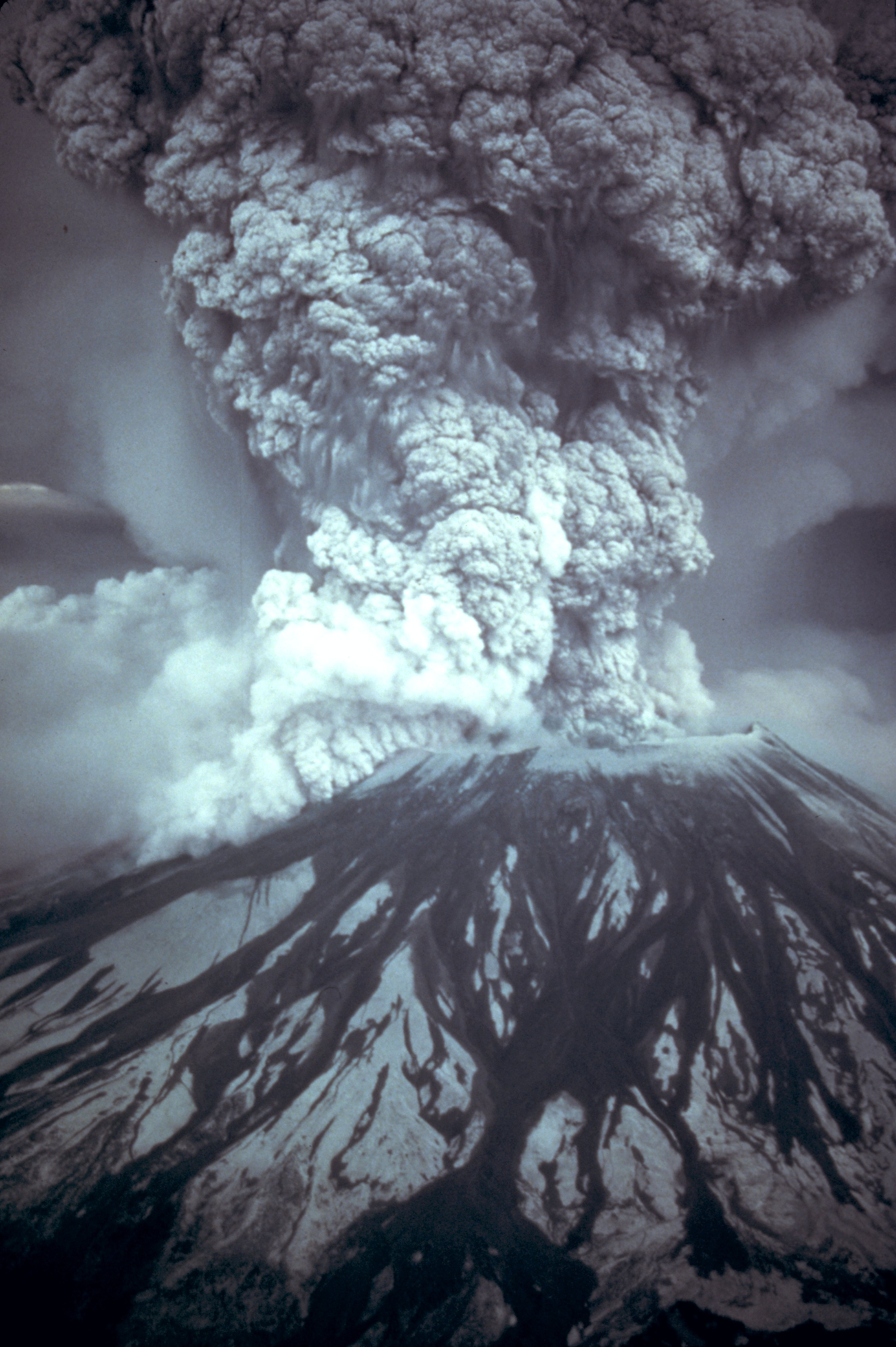
1980 eruption of Mount St. Helens taken by photographer Austin Post (USGS)

Despite being assigned to stay on the mountain only until May 17, Blackburn opted to stay a few more days. Blackburn was situated near Coldwater Creek, 8 miles (13 km) from the volcano, on the day of the eruption.

Early on May 18, an earthquake measuring 5.1 on the Richter scale struck the region, creating a massive landslide—0.6 cubic miles (3 km^{3}) of rock that released pressure on the volcano's crater, causing an ejection of steam. Just seconds later, Mount St. Helens erupted laterally, sending supersonic pyroclastic flows into the forest below.

During the eruption, Blackburn was able to trigger two remotely operated advanced Nikon cameras setup on tripods at his Coldwater I camp 46°17′55.8″N 122°17′22.9″W and at a location above Spirit Lake. Both were powered by a car battery and placed inside Styrofoam ice chests to protect them. His final notebook entries noted shots taken at 8:33 am and 8:34 am, and his notebook was found inside his radio transmitter case. Neither of the remote cameras were ever found.

== Death ==
Blackburn was killed when a pyroclastic flow enveloped the area where he was camped out. His car was found four days later, surrounded up to the windows in ash with his body inside 46°17′53.1″N 122°17′23.5″W. The windows had been broken and ash filled the interior of the vehicle.

In early June, National Geographic photographer Fred Stocker recovered Blackburn's camera from debris 2.5 feet (0.8 m) thick. The film was not salvageable, as the intense heat from the eruption had corrupted the negatives.

The 1980 event was the deadliest and most destructive volcanic eruption in the history of the United States. A total of 57 people are known to have died, and more were left homeless when the ash falls and pyroclastic flows destroyed or buried 200 houses. In addition to Blackburn, local resident Harry R. Truman, photographer Robert Landsburg, and volcanologist David Alexander Johnston were killed.

== Legacy ==
After his death, friends and coworkers of Blackburn came forward to compliment his pleasant character and his talent. Friends described Blackburn as having "an impishness his friends came to expect." Coworker Mike Prager called Reid "one of the funniest and most talented journalists in the Pacific Northwest" who "made his job look easy, he was that good." Tom Koenninger, editor of The Columbian, described Blackburn's humor as "wry" and sometimes "acerbic", but elaborated that Blackburn was "gentle, displaying aggression when it was necessary for him to get close to a subject he was photographing." Commenting on her husband's dedication to photography, Fay Blackburn remarked, "if Reid were alive today, he'd probably be back on the front line seeking to capture the latest chapter in the mountain's evolution, in spite of the risk." "Reid loved that mountain. He climbed it, hiked it, skied it." She added that he died doing what he loved.

The National Press Photographers Association awards a competitive scholarship annually in Blackburn's honor, worth $2,000. In 2005 The Columbian offered an internship to applicants for the scholarship in memory of Blackburn.

In December 2013, a roll of undeveloped film containing pre-eruption shots of Mount St. Helens was discovered in Blackburn's archives at The Columbian. The photos, taken by Blackburn during a helicopter photo shoot of the mountain the month before the eruption, were successfully developed over 30 years after Blackburn's death, and remain journalistically important as a record of the pre-eruption landscape.

== See also ==
- Robert Landsburg
