= 1980 eruption of Mount St. Helens =

Major volcanic eruption in Skamania County, Washington

Eruption of Mount St. Helens
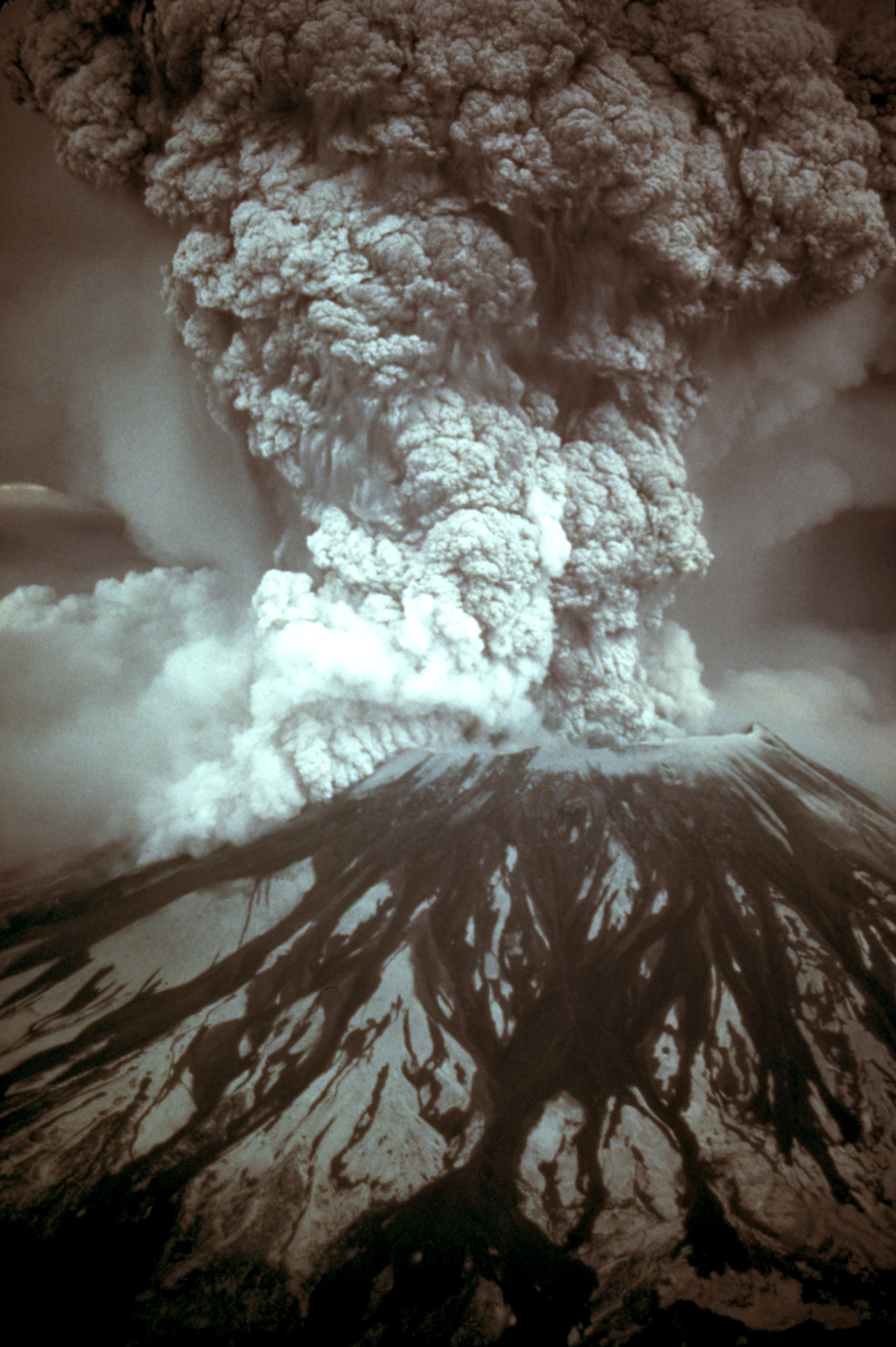
- The eruption column, May 18, 1980
- Volcano: Mount St. Helens
- Date: May 18, 1980; 46 years ago (climactic episode)
- Type: Phreatic; Plinian; Peléan
- Location: Skamania County, Washington, U.S. 46°12′1″N 122°11′12″W
- VEI: 5
- Impact: Approximately 57 deaths, about $1.1 billion in property damage ($3.6 billion in 2025); caused a collapse of the volcano's northern flank, deposited ash in eleven U.S. states and five Canadian provinces

Maps
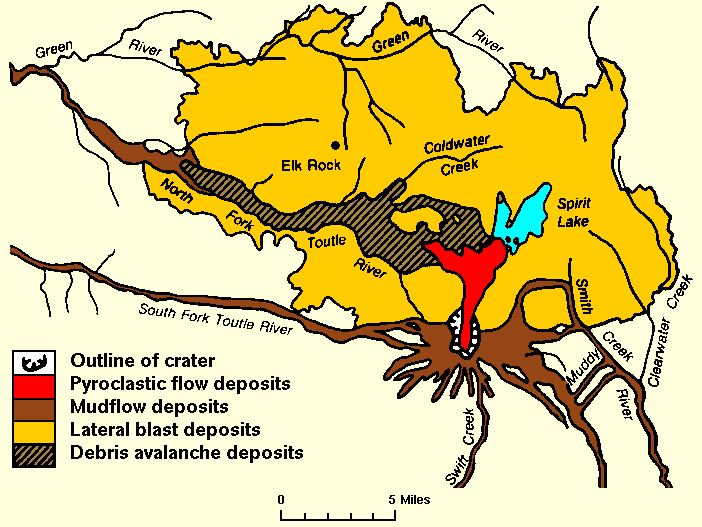
- Map of eruption deposits

On May 18, 1980, at 8:32 a.m., Mount St. Helens in Skamania County, Washington, United States, experienced a catastrophic explosive eruption which had a volcanic explosivity index of 5. It was the first to occur in the contiguous United States since the much smaller 1915 eruption of Lassen Peak in California. The main eruption was preceded by a series of volcanic explosions, pyroclastic flows, and phreatic blasts beginning in March 1980. It has often been considered the most disastrous volcanic event in U.S. history.

The eruption was preceded by a series of earthquakes and steam-venting episodes caused by an injection of magma at shallow depth below the volcano that created a large bulge and a fracture system on the mountain's north slope. An earthquake at 8:32:11 am PDT (UTC−7) on May 18, 1980, caused the entire weakened north face to slide away, a sector collapse which was the largest subaerial landslide in recorded history. This allowed the partly molten rock, rich in high-pressure gas and steam, to suddenly explode northward toward Spirit Lake in a hot mix of lava and pulverized rock, overtaking the landslide. An eruption column rose 80,000 feet (24 km; 15 mi) into the atmosphere and deposited ash in 11 U.S. states and various Canadian provinces. At the same time, snow, ice, and several entire glaciers on the volcano melted, forming a series of large lahars (volcanic mudslides) that reached as far as the Columbia River, nearly 50 miles (80 km) to the southwest. Less severe outbursts continued into the next day, only to be followed by other large, but not as destructive, eruptions later that year. The thermal energy released during the eruption was equal to 26 megatons of TNT.

About 57 people were killed, including innkeeper and World War I veteran Harry R. Truman, photographers Reid Blackburn and Robert Landsburg, and volcanologist David A. Johnston. Hundreds of square miles were reduced to wasteland, causing over $1 billion in damage (equivalent to $3.6 billion in 2025). Thousands of animals were killed, and Mount St. Helens was left with a crater on its north side. At the time of the eruption, the summit of the volcano was owned by the Burlington Northern Railroad, but the United States Forest Service acquired the land from the railroad after the eruption. The area was later preserved in the Mount St. Helens National Volcanic Monument and the State of Washington recognized the month of May as "Volcano Awareness Month". Events are held at Mt. St. Helens and within the region to discuss the eruption and safety concerns, and to commemorate lives lost during the disaster.

== Build-up to the eruption ==
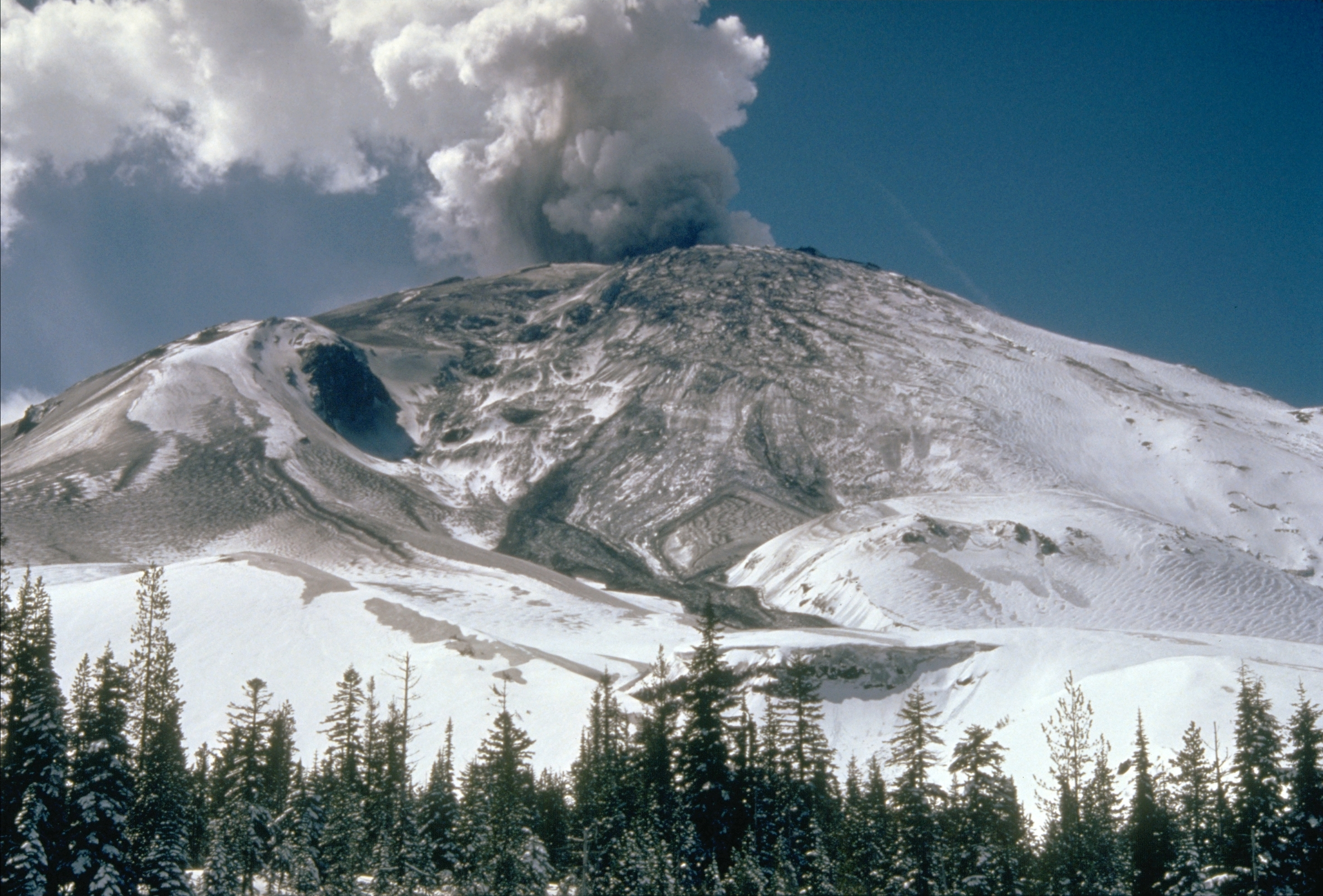
USGS photo showing a pre-avalanche eruption on April 10

Mount St. Helens remained dormant from its last period of activity in the 1840s and 1850s until March 1980. Several small earthquakes, beginning on March 15, indicated that magma might have begun moving below the volcano. On March 20, at 3:45 pm Pacific Standard Time, a shallow 4.2-magnitude earthquake, centered below the volcano's north flank, signaled the volcano's return from 123 years of hibernation. A gradually building earthquake swarm saturated area seismographs and started to climax at about noon on March 25, reaching peak levels in the next two days, including an earthquake registering 5.1 on the Richter scale among a total of 174 shocks of magnitude 2.6 or greater.

Shocks of magnitude 3.2 or greater occurred at a slightly increasing rate during April and May, with five earthquakes of magnitude 4 or above per day in early April, and eight per day the week before May 18. Initially, no direct sign of eruption was seen, but small earthquake-induced avalanches of snow and ice were reported from aerial observations.

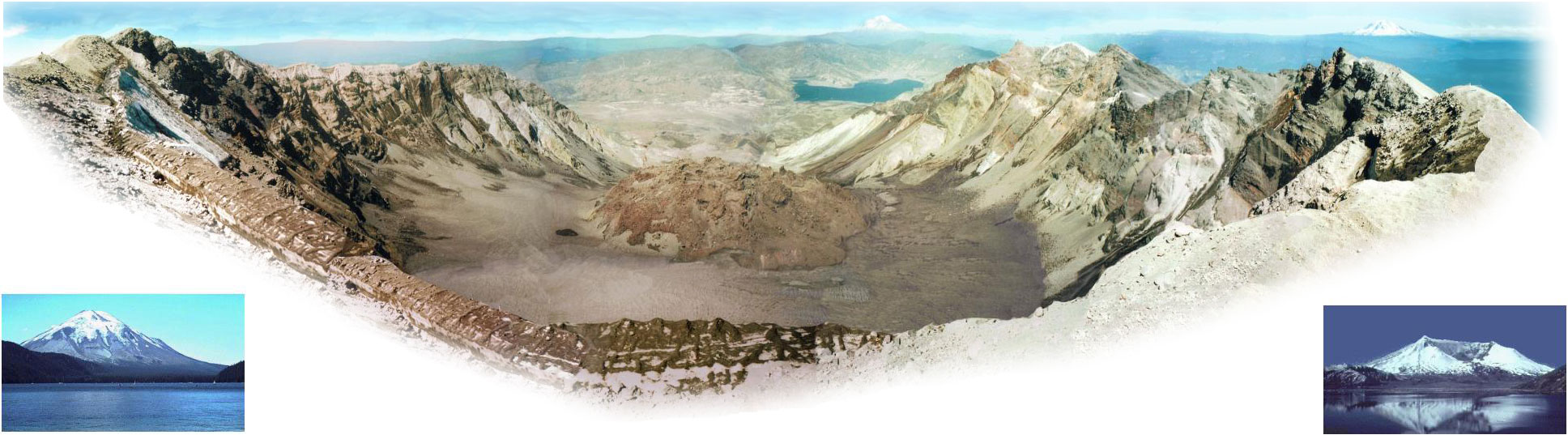
Mount St. Helens seen from Monitor Ridge. This image shows the cone of devastation, the huge crater open to the north, the post eruption lava dome inside, and Crater Glacier surrounding the lava dome. The small photo on the left was taken from Spirit Lake before the eruption, and the small photo on the right was taken after the eruption from roughly the same place. Spirit Lake can also be seen in the larger image, as well as Mount Rainier and Mount Adams.

At 12:36 pm on March 27, phreatic eruptions (explosions of steam caused by magma suddenly heating groundwater) ejected and smashed rock from within the old summit crater, excavating a new crater 250 feet (75 m) wide, and sending an ash column about 7,000 feet (2.1 km) into the air. By this date, a 16,000-foot-long (4.9 km) eastward-trending fracture system had also developed across the summit area. This was followed by more earthquake swarms and a series of steam explosions that sent ash 10,000 to 11,000 feet (3,000 to 3,400 m) above their vent. Most of this ash fell between 3 and 12 mi (5 and 19 km) from its vent, but some was carried 150 mi (240 km) south to Bend, Oregon, or 285 mi (460 km) east to Spokane, Washington.

A second, new crater and a blue flame were observed on March 29. The flame was visibly emitted from both craters and was probably created by burning gases. Static electricity generated from ash clouds rolling down the volcano sent out lightning bolts that were up to 2 mi (3 km) long. Ninety-three separate outbursts were reported on March 30, and increasingly strong harmonic tremors were first detected on April 1, alarming geologists and prompting Governor Dixy Lee Ray to declare a state of emergency on April 3. Governor Ray issued an executive order on April 30 creating a "red zone" around the volcano; anyone caught in this zone without a pass faced a $500 fine (equivalent to $2,000 in 2025) or six months in jail. This precluded many cabin owners from visiting their property.

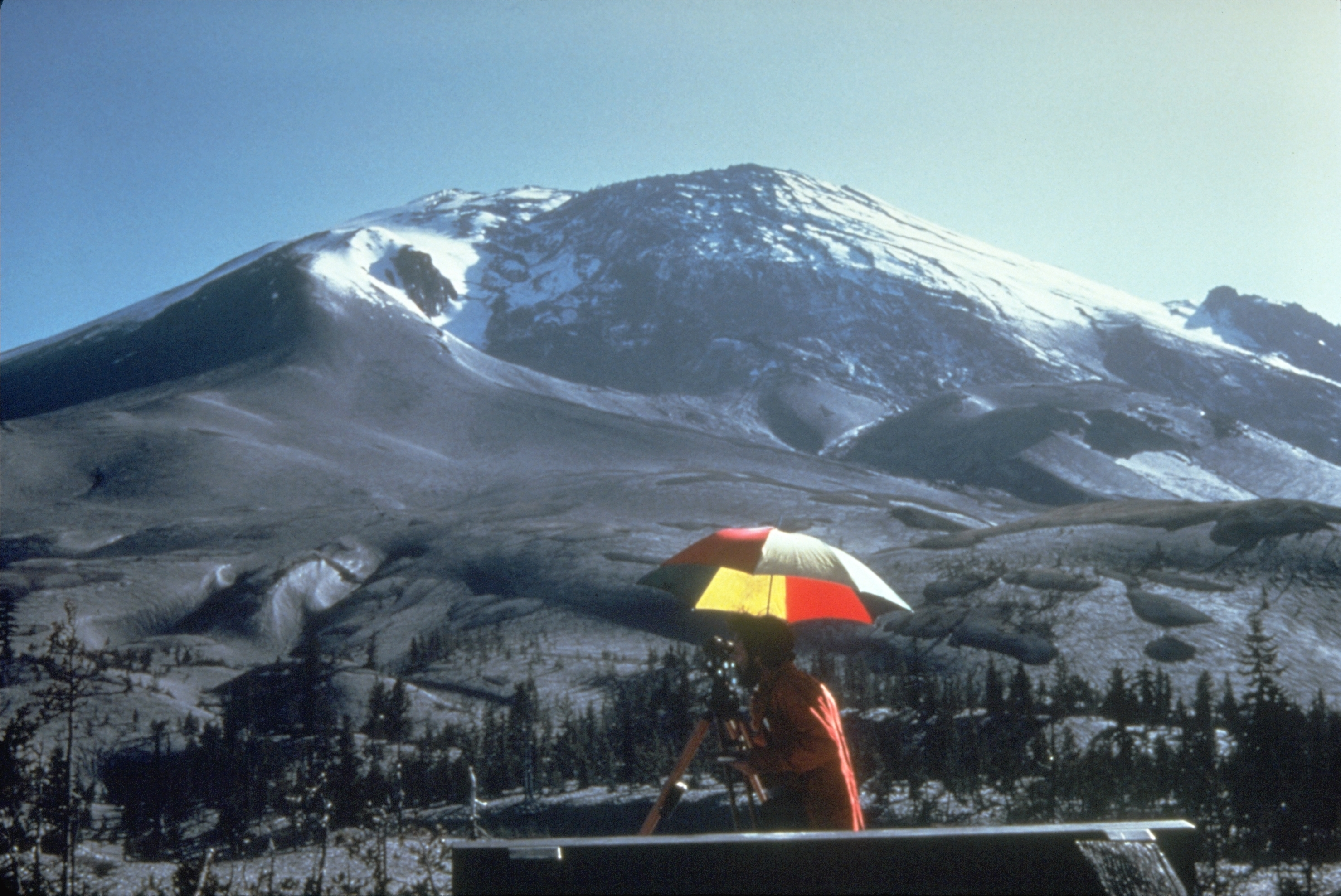
Photo showing the bulge growing due to a cryptodome on April 27

By April 7 the combined crater was 1,700 by 1,200 ft (520 by 370 m) and 500 ft (150 m) deep. A USGS (United States Geological Survey) team determined in the last week of April that a 1.5 mi-diameter (2.4 km) section of St. Helens' north face was displaced outward by at least 270 ft (82 m). For the rest of April and early May, this bulge grew by 5 to 6 ft (1.5 to 1.8 m) per day, and by mid-May, it extended more than 400 ft (120 m) north. As the bulge moved northward, the summit area behind it progressively sank, forming a complex, down-dropped block called a graben. Geologists announced on April 30 that sliding of the bulge area was the greatest immediate danger and that such a landslide might spark an eruption. These changes in the volcano's shape were related to the overall deformation that increased the volume of the volcano by 0.03 mi^{3} (0.13 km^{3}) by mid-May. This volume increase presumably corresponded to the volume of magma that pushed into the volcano and deformed its surface. Because the intruding magma remained below ground and was not directly visible, it was called a cryptodome, in contrast to a true lava dome exposed at the surface.

Volcanologist Barry Voight was contacted by Rocky Crandell, a USGS employee working in the Vancouver office near the mountain. Crandell sought Voight's expertise in landslides, hoping Voight would opine on the growing bulge. In his reporting to Crandell and his associates, Voight, who observed the mountain April 11–19, said that the bulge could fail and collapse the volcano's entire north sector. He suggested they begin monitoring the rate of movement of the bulge, worried that the collapse could trigger an eruption. He also advised hiring a local surveyor to take measurements, offending several of the geologists. Shortly after, Voight left the mountain and returned to teaching classes at Pennsylvania State University. On May 1, he sent his full report to the USGS, summarizing his predictions, predicting the failure of the bulge and the collapse of the mountain's north side followed by a violent eruption that would require an extensive evacuation zone.

On May 7, eruptions similar to those in March and April resumed, and over the following days, the bulge approached its maximum size. All activity had been confined to the 350-year-old summit dome and did not involve any new magma. About 10,000 earthquakes were recorded before the May 18 event, with most concentrated in a small zone less than 1.6 mi (2.6 km) directly below the bulge. Visible eruptions ceased on May 16, reducing public interest and consequently the number of spectators in the area. Mounting public pressure then forced officials to allow 50 carloads of property owners to enter the danger zone on Saturday, May 17, to gather whatever property they could carry. Another trip was scheduled for 10 am the next day, a Sunday, when more than three hundred loggers who would normally be working in the area were not present.

By the time of the climactic eruption, dacite magma intruding into the volcano had forced the north flank outward nearly 500 ft (150 m) and heated the volcano's groundwater system, causing many steam-driven explosions (phreatic eruptions).

== Landslide and climactic phase ==
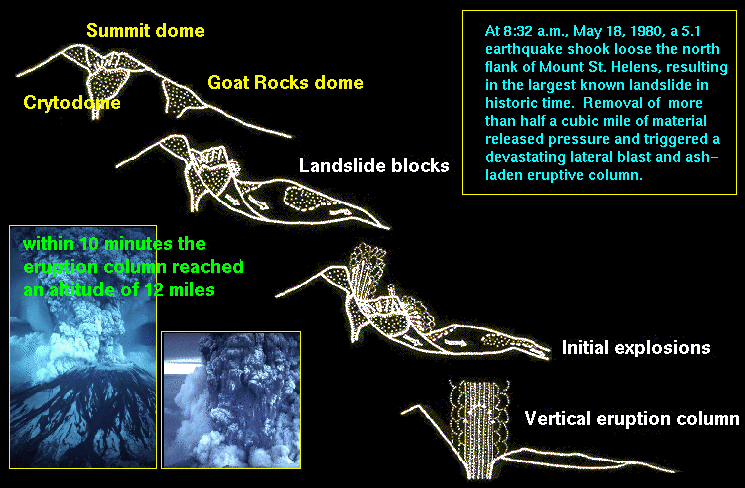
Sequence of events on May 18

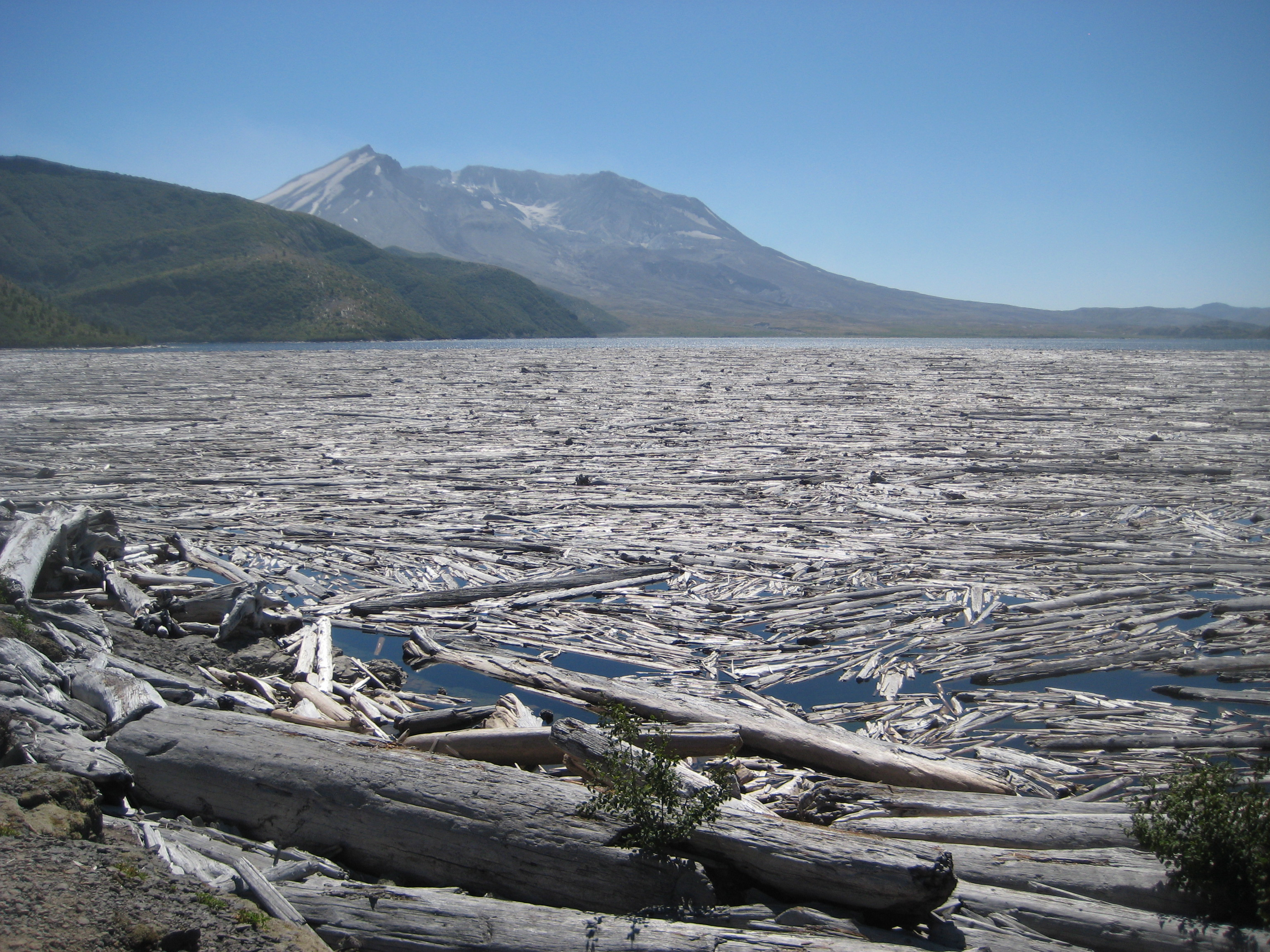
Lakes nearest to Mount St. Helens have been partly covered with fallen trees since the eruption. This photograph was taken in 2012.

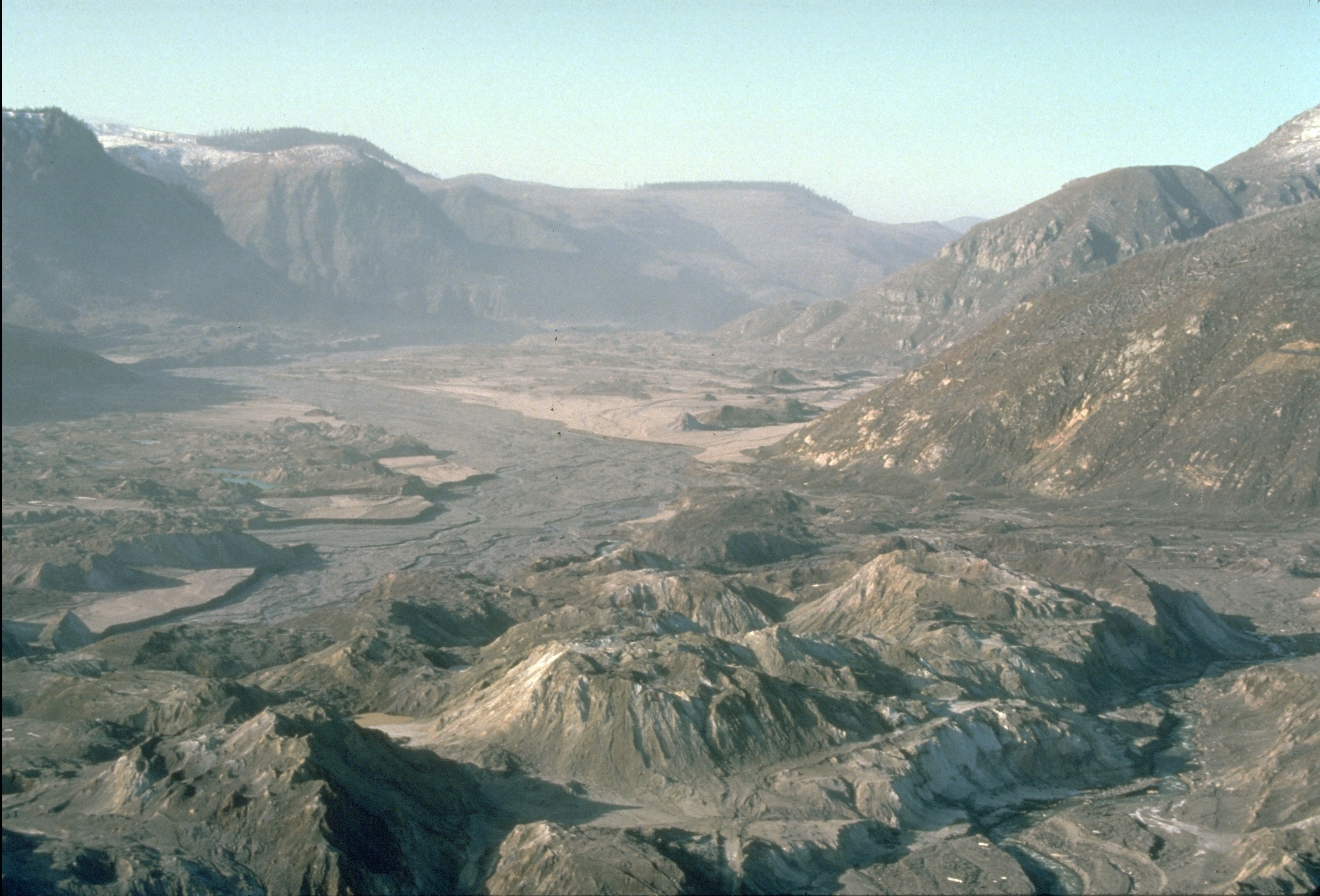
The North Fork Toutle River valley filled with landslide deposits

At dawn May 18, Mount St. Helens' activity did not show any change from the pattern of the preceding month. The rates of bulge movement and sulfur dioxide emission, and ground temperature readings did not reveal any changes indicating a catastrophic eruption. USGS volcanologist David A. Johnston was on duty at an observation post around 6 mi (10 km) north of the volcano. At 6:00 am Johnston's measurements did not indicate any unusual activity.

At 8:32 am, a magnitude 5.1 earthquake centered directly below the north slope triggered that part of the volcano to slide, approximately 7–20 seconds after the shock, followed a few seconds later by the main volcanic blast. The sector collapse, the largest subaerial landslide in recorded history, traveled at 110 to 155 mph (180 to 250 km/h; 50 to 70 m/s) and moved across Spirit Lake's west arm. Part of it hit a 1,150 ft-high (350 m) ridge about 6 mi (10 km) north. Some of the slide spilled over the ridge, but most of it moved 13 mi (21 km) down the North Fork Toutle River, filling its valley up to 600 feet (180 m) deep with avalanche debris. An area of about 24 mi^{2} (62 km^{2}) was covered, and the total volume of the deposit was about 0.7 mi^{3} (2.9 km^{3}).

Scientists were able to reconstruct the motion of the landslide from a series of rapid photographs by Gary Rosenquist, who was camping 11 mi (18 km) away from the blast 46°18′49″N 122°02′12″W. Rosenquist, his party, and his photographs survived because the blast was deflected by local topography 1 mi (1.6 km) short of his location.

Sound of the eruption of Mount St. Helens, as heard from 140 miles away
Amateur recording of a series of booms produced by the eruption, as heard from the town of Newport, Oregon (audio filtered and amplified).

Most of St. Helens' former north side became a rubble deposit 17 mi (27 km) long, averaging 150 ft (46 m) thick; the slide was thickest at 1 mi (1.6 km) below Spirit Lake and thinnest at its western margin. The landslide temporarily displaced the waters of Spirit Lake to the ridge north of the lake, in a giant wave about 600 ft (180 m) high. This, in turn, created a 295 ft (90 m) avalanche of debris consisting of the returning waters and thousands of uprooted trees and stumps. Some of these remained intact with roots, but most had been sheared off at the stump seconds earlier by the blast of superheated volcanic gas and ash that had immediately followed and overtaken the initial landslide. The debris was transported along with the water as it returned to its basin, raising the surface level of Spirit Lake by about 200 ft (61 m).

Four decades after the eruption, floating log mats persist on Spirit Lake and nearby St. Helens Lake, changing position with the wind. The rest of the trees, especially those that were not completely detached from their roots, were turned upright by their own weight and became waterlogged, sinking into the muddy sediments at the bottom where they are in the process of becoming petrified in the anaerobic and mineral-rich waters. This provides insight into other sites with a similar fossil record.

== Pyroclastic flows ==
=== Initial lateral blast ===
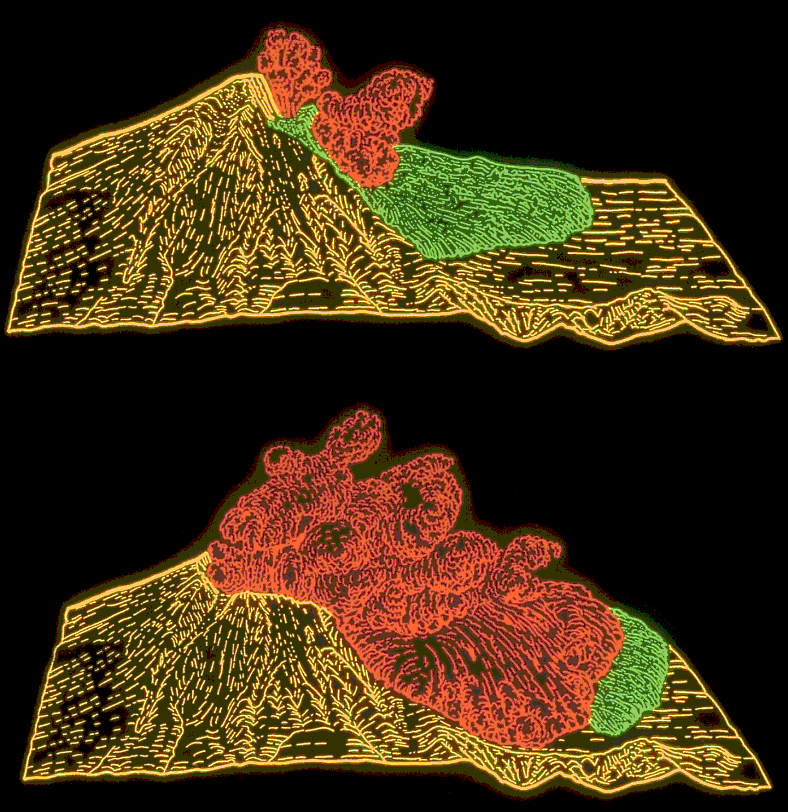
Computer graphics showing the May 18 landslide (green) being overtaken by the initial pyroclastic flow (red)

The landslide exposed the dacite magma in Mount St. Helens' neck to much lower pressure, causing the gas-charged, partially molten rock and high-pressure steam above it to explode a few seconds after the landslide started. Explosions burst through the trailing part of the landslide, blasting rock debris northward. The resulting blast directed the pyroclastic flow laterally. It consisted of very hot volcanic gases, ash, and pumice formed from new lava, as well as pulverized old rock, which hugged the ground. Initially moving about 220 mph (350 km/h), the blast quickly accelerated to around 670 mph (1,080 km/h), and it may have briefly passed the speed of sound.

Pyroclastic flow material passed over the moving avalanche and spread outward, devastating a fan-shaped area 23 miles across by 19 miles long (37 km by 31 km). In total, about 230 sq mi (600 km^{2}) of forest were knocked down, and extreme heat killed trees miles beyond the blow-down zone. At its vent, the lateral blast probably did not last longer than about thirty seconds, but the northward-radiating and expanding blast cloud continued for about another minute.

Superheated flow material flashed water in Spirit Lake and North Fork Toutle River to steam, creating a larger, secondary explosion that was heard as far away as British Columbia, Montana, Idaho, and Northern California, yet many areas closer to the eruption (Portland, Oregon, for example) did not hear the blast. This so-called "quiet zone" extended radially a few tens of miles from the volcano and was created by the complex response of the eruption's sound waves to differences in temperature and air motion of the atmospheric layers, and to a lesser extent, local topography.

Later studies indicated that one-third of the 0.045 mi^{3} (0.19 km^{3}) of material in the flow was new lava, and the rest was fragmented, older rock.

=== Lateral blast result ===
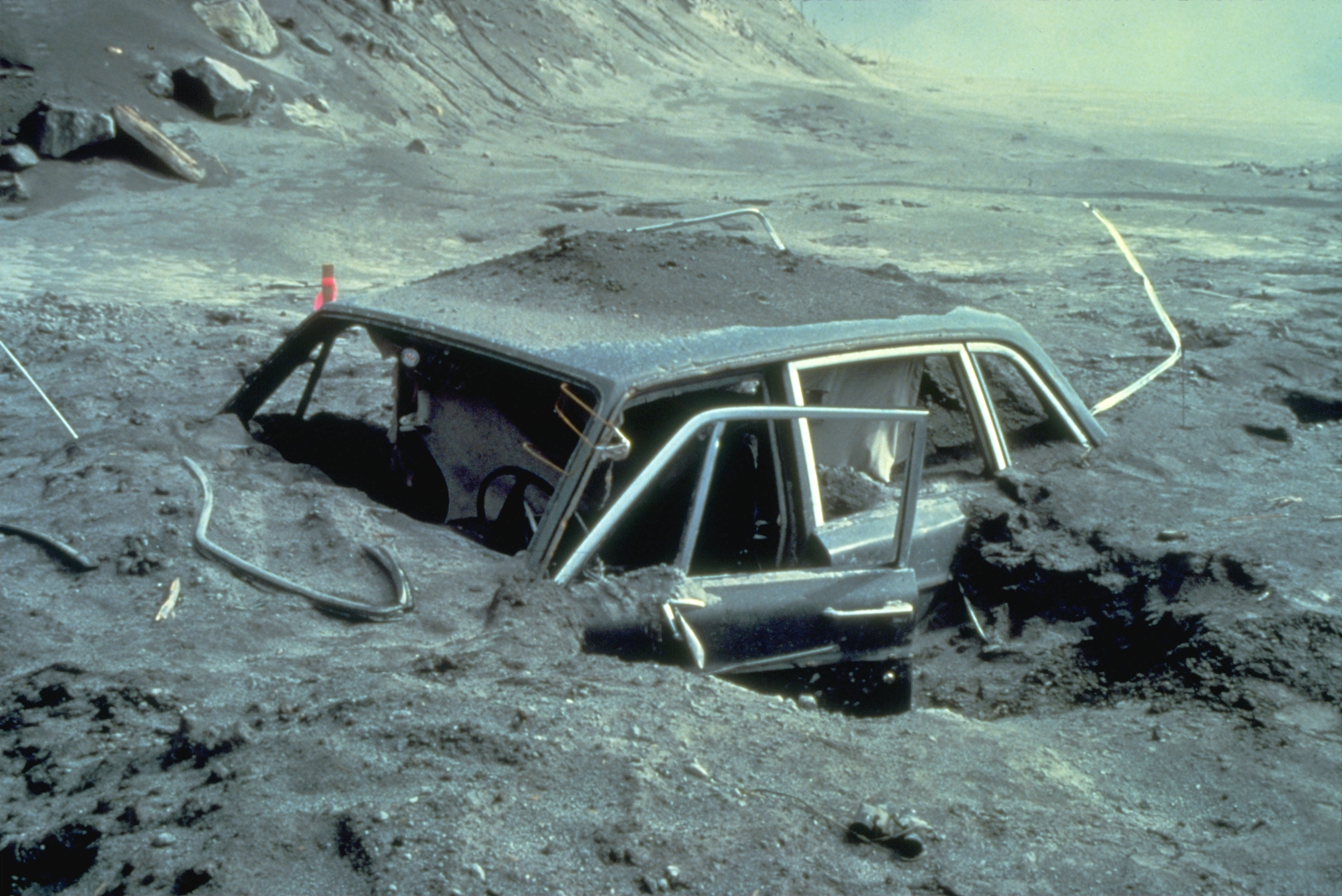
Reid Blackburn's car after the eruption

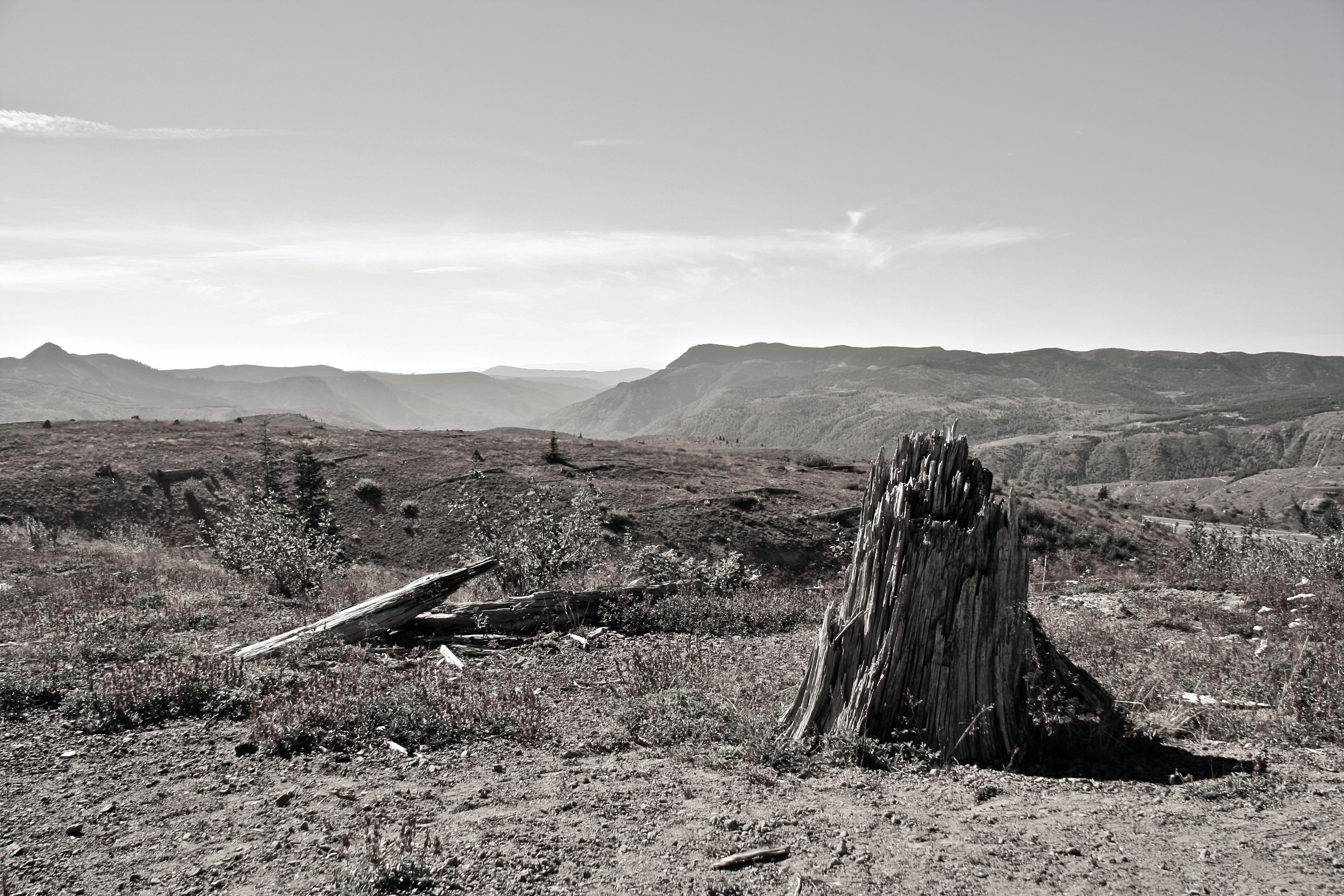
Many trees in the direct blast zone were snapped off at their bases and the earth was stripped and scorched.

The huge ensuing ash cloud sent skyward from St. Helens' northern foot was visible throughout the quiet zone. The near-supersonic lateral blast, loaded with volcanic debris, caused devastation as far as 19 mi (31 km) from the volcano. The area affected by the blast can be subdivided into roughly concentric zones:

1. Direct blast zone, the innermost zone, averaged about 8 mi (13 km) in radius, an area in which virtually everything, natural or artificial, was obliterated or carried away. For this reason, this zone also has been called the "tree-removal zone". The flow of the material carried by the blast was not deflected by topographic features in this zone. The blast released energy equal to 24 megatonnes of TNT (100 petajoules).
2. Channelized blast zone, an intermediate zone, extended out to distances as far as 19 mi (31 km) from the volcano, an area in which the flow flattened everything in its path and was channeled to some extent by topography. In this zone, the forces and direction of the blast are strikingly demonstrated by the parallel alignment of toppled large trees, broken off at the base of the trunk as if they were blades of grass mown by a scythe. This zone was also known as the "tree-down zone". Channeling and deflection of the blast caused strikingly varied local effects that still remained conspicuous after some decades. Where the blast struck open land directly, it scoured it, breaking trees off short and stripping vegetation and even topsoil, thereby delaying revegetation for many years. Where the blast was deflected so as to pass overhead by several metres, it left the topsoil and the seeds it contained, permitting faster revegetation with scrub and herbaceous plants, and later with saplings. Trees in the path of such higher-level blasts were broken off wholesale at various heights, whereas nearby stands in more sheltered positions recovered comparatively rapidly without conspicuous long-term harm.
3. Seared zone, also called the "standing dead" zone, the outermost fringe of the impacted area, is a zone in which trees remained standing, but were singed brown by the hot gases of the blast.

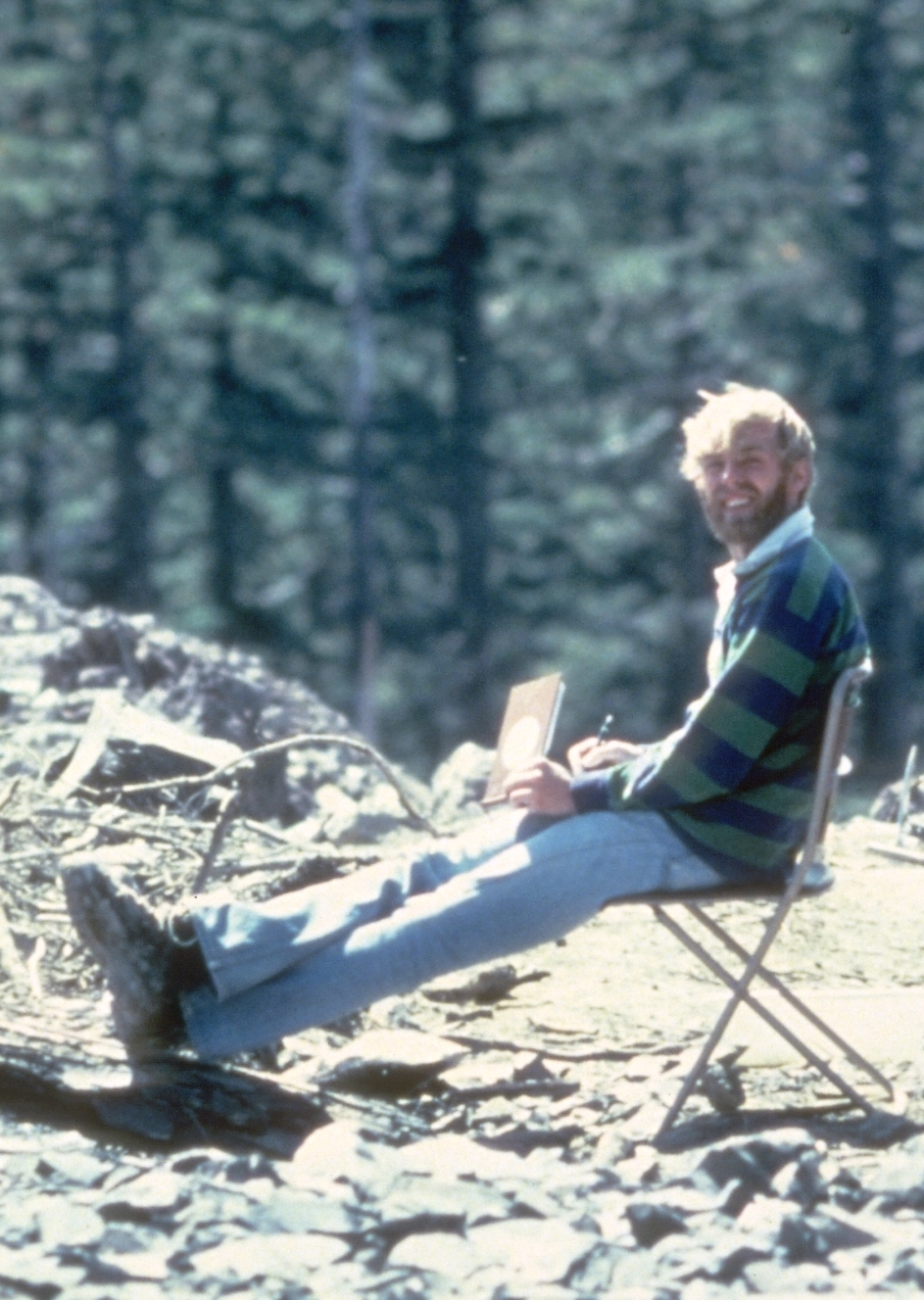
Volcanologist David A. Johnston (pictured 13 hours before his death) was among the approximately 57 people killed by the eruption.

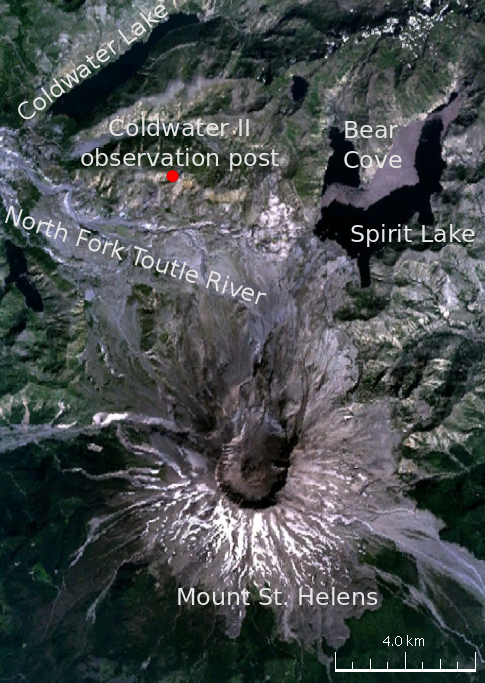
Johnston's Coldwater II observation post, marked by the red dot, was in the path of the blast when the north side of Mount St. Helens collapsed.

By the time this pyroclastic flow hit its first human victims, it was still as hot as 680 °F (360 °C) and filled with suffocating gas and flying debris. Most of the 57 people known to have died in that day's eruption succumbed to asphyxiation, while several died from burns. Lodge owner Harry R. Truman was buried under hundreds of feet of avalanche material 46°15′59.6″N 122°09′33.3″W. Volcanologist David A. Johnston, who was stationed at observation post Coldwater II 46°16′37.5″N 122°13′28.0″W, located just six miles (ten km) north of the mountain, was killed 46°17′37″N 122°13′27.1″W, as was Reid Blackburn 46°17′53.1″N 122°17′23.5″W, a Vancouver Columbian and National Geographic photographer who was situated near Coldwater Creek 46°17′55.8″N 122°17′22.9″W, 8 miles (13 km) from the volcano, on the day of the eruption. Robert Landsburg, another photographer, who was within a few miles of the summit 46°12′46.3″N 122°16′03.3″W, was killed by the ash cloud. He was able to protect his film with his body, and the surviving photos provided geologists with valuable documentation of the historic eruption. Another eruption victim, amateur radio operator Gerry Martin, located near the Coldwater peak and farther north of Johnston's position 46°17′59.7″N 122°12′55″W, reported his sighting of the eruption enveloping the Coldwater II observation post. As the blast overwhelmed Johnston's post, Martin declared solemnly: "Gentlemen, the camper and car that's sitting over to the south of me is covered. It's going to hit me, too." before his radio went silent.

=== Later flows ===
Subsequent outpourings of pyroclastic material from the breach left by the landslide consisted mainly of new magmatic debris rather than fragments of pre-existing volcanic rocks. The resulting deposits formed a fan-like pattern of overlapping sheets, tongues, and lobes. At least 17 separate pyroclastic flows occurred during the May 18 eruption, and their aggregate volume was about 0.05 mi^{3} (0.21 km^{3}).

The flow deposits were still at about 570 to 790 °F (300 to 420 °C) two weeks after they erupted. Secondary steam-blast eruptions fed by this heat created pits on the northern margin of the pyroclastic-flow deposits, at the south shore of Spirit Lake, and along the upper part of the North Fork Toutle River. These steam-blast explosions continued sporadically for weeks or months after the emplacement of pyroclastic flows, and at least one occurred a year later, on May 16, 1981.

== Ash column ==
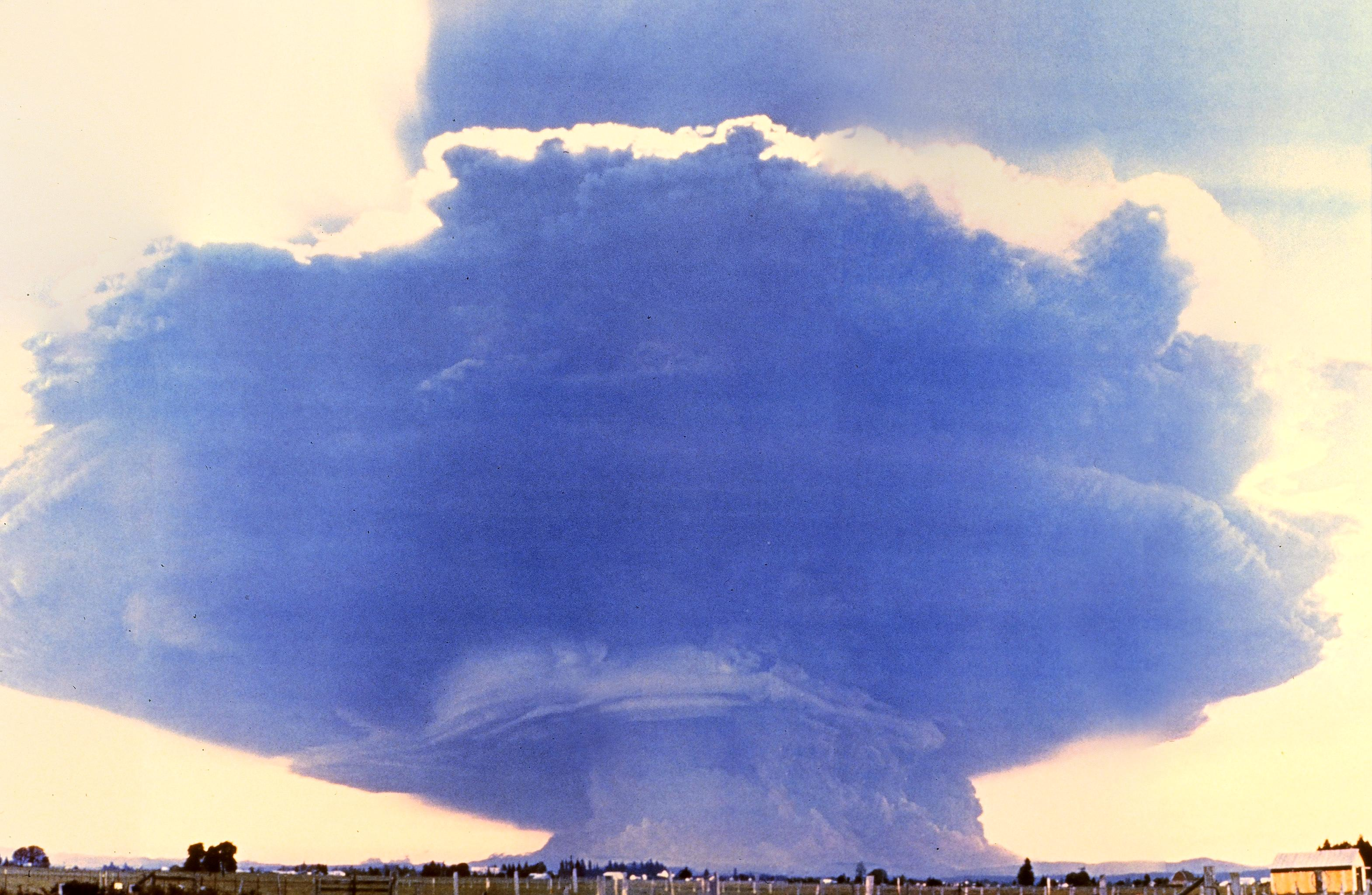
The ash cloud produced by the eruption, as seen from the village of Toledo, Washington, 35 mi (56 km) to the northwest of Mount St. Helens. The cloud was roughly 40 mi (64 km) wide and 15 mi (24 km; 79,000 ft) high.

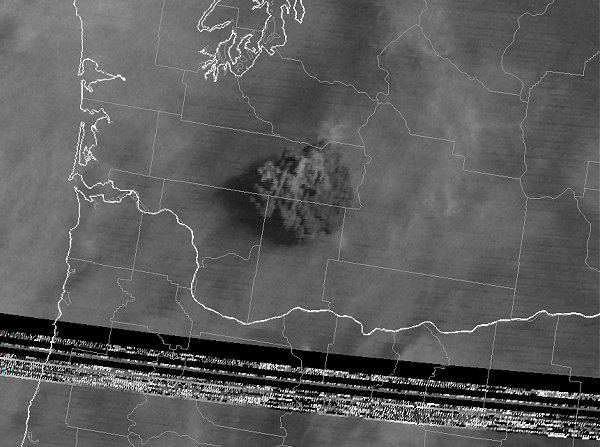
Ash cloud from Mt. St. Helens as captured by the GOES 3 weather satellite at 15:45 UTC

As the avalanche and initial pyroclastic flow were still advancing, a huge ash column grew to a height of 12 mi (19 km) above the expanding crater in less than ten minutes and spread tephra into the stratosphere for ten straight hours. Near the volcano, the swirling ash particles in the atmosphere generated lightning, which in turn started many forest fires. During this time, parts of the mushroom-shaped ash-cloud column collapsed, and fell back upon the earth. This fallout, mixed with magma, mud, and steam, sent additional pyroclastic flows speeding down St. Helens' flanks. Later, slower flows came directly from the new north-facing crater and consisted of glowing pumice bombs and very hot pumiceous ash. Some of these hot flows covered ice or water, which flashed to steam, creating craters up to 65 ft (20 m) in diameter and sending ash as much as 6,500 ft (2,000 m) into the air.

Strong, high-altitude wind carried much of this material east-northeasterly from the volcano at an average speed around 60 miles per hour (100 km/h). By 9:45 am, it had reached Yakima, Washington, 90 mi (140 km) away, and by 11:45 it was over Spokane, Washington. A total of 4 to 5 in (100 to 130 mm) of ash fell on Yakima, and areas as far east as Spokane were plunged into darkness by noon, where visibility was reduced to 10 ft (3 m) and 0.5 in (13 mm) of ash fell. Continuing eastward, St. Helens' ash fell in the western part of Yellowstone National Park by 10:15 pm, and was seen on the ground in Denver the next day. In time, ash fall from this eruption was reported as far away as Minnesota and Oklahoma, and some of the ash drifted around the globe within about two weeks.

During the nine hours of vigorous eruptive activity, about 540,000,000 tons (540×10^{6} short tons or 490×10^{6} t) of ash fell over an area of more than 22,000 mi^{2} (57,000 km^{2}). The total volume of the ash before its compaction by rainfall was about 0.3 mi^{3} (1.3 km^{3}). The volume of the uncompacted ash is equivalent to about 0.05 mi^{3} (0.21 km^{3}) of solid rock, or about 7% of the amount of material that slid off in the debris avalanche. By 5:30 pm on May 18, the vertical ash column declined in stature, but less severe outbursts continued through the next several days.

== Ash properties ==
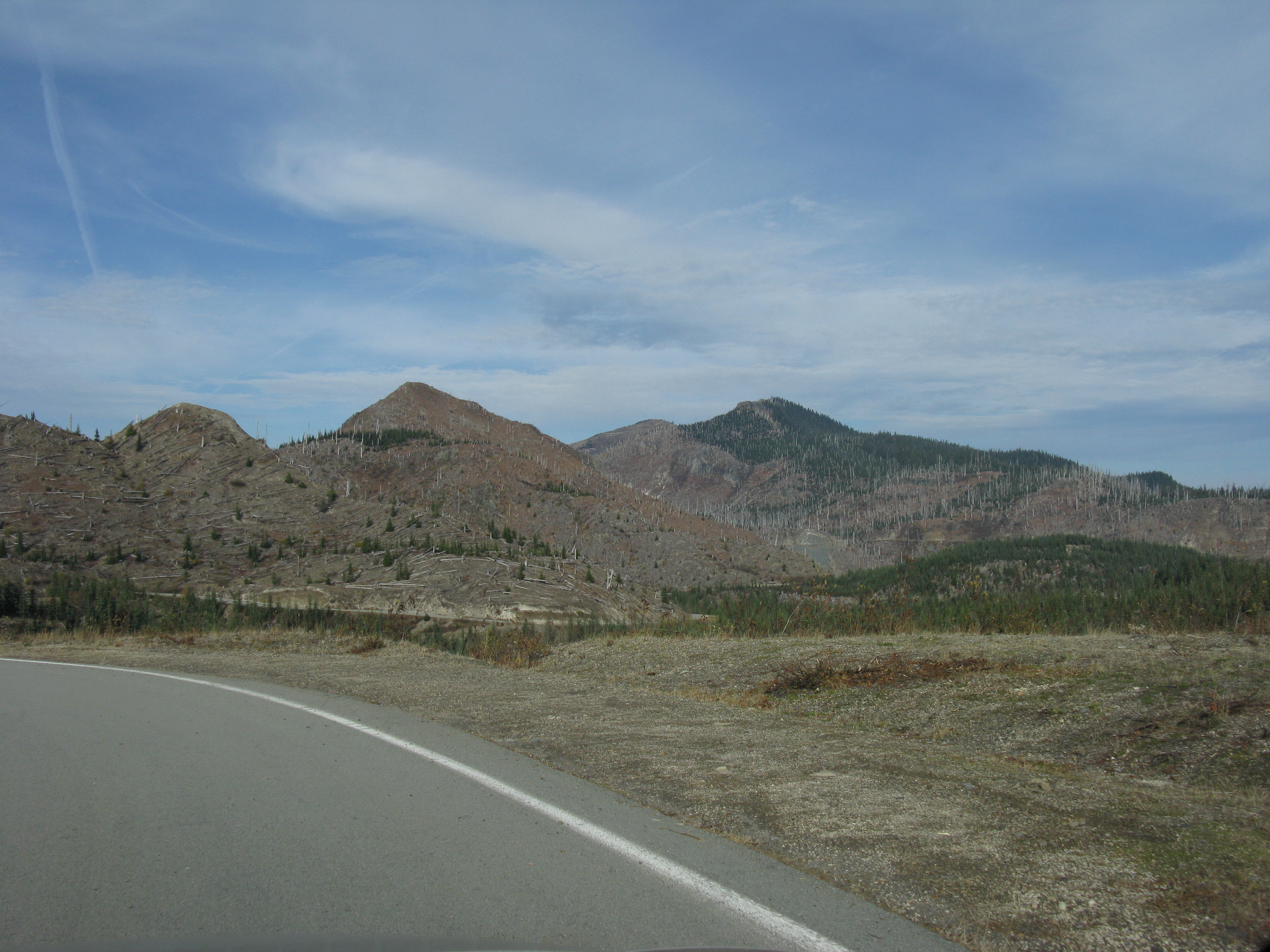
Residual lateral blast effects in the channelized blast zone, thirty years after the eruption

Generally, given that the way airborne ash is deposited after an eruption is strongly influenced by the meteorological conditions, a certain variation of the ash type will occur, as a function of distance to the volcano or time elapsed from eruption. The ash from Mount St. Helens is no exception, hence the ash properties have large variations.

=== Chemical composition ===
The bulk chemical composition of the ash has been found to be about 65% silicon dioxide, 18% aluminum oxide, 5% ferric oxide, 4% each calcium oxide and sodium oxide, and 2% magnesium oxide. Trace elements were also detected, their concentrations varying as 0.05–0.09% chlorine, 0.02–0.03% fluorine, and 0.09–0.3% sulfur.

=== Index of refraction ===
The index of refraction, a measure used in physics to describe how light propagates through a particular substance, is an important property of volcanic ash. This number is complex, having both real and imaginary parts, the real part indicating how light disperses and the imaginary part indicating how light is absorbed by the substance.

The silicate particles are known to have a real index of refraction ranging between 1.5 and 1.6 for visible light. However, a spectrum of colors is associated with samples of volcanic ash, from very light to dark gray. This makes for variations in the measured imaginary refractive index under visible light.

In the case of Mount St. Helens, the ash settled in three main layers on the ground:

- The bottom layer was dark gray and was found to be abundant in older rocks and crystal fragments.
- The middle layer consisted of a mixture of glass shards and pumice.
- The top layer was ash consisting of very fine particles.

For example, when comparing the imaginary part of the refractive index k of stratospheric ash from 9.3 and 11.2 mi (15 and 18 km) from the volcano, they have similar values around 700 nm (around 0.009), while they differ significantly around 300 nm. Here, the 11.2 mi (18 km) sample (k was found to be around 0.009) was much more absorbent than the 9.3 mi (15 km) sample (k was found to be around 0.002).

== Mudslides flow downstream ==
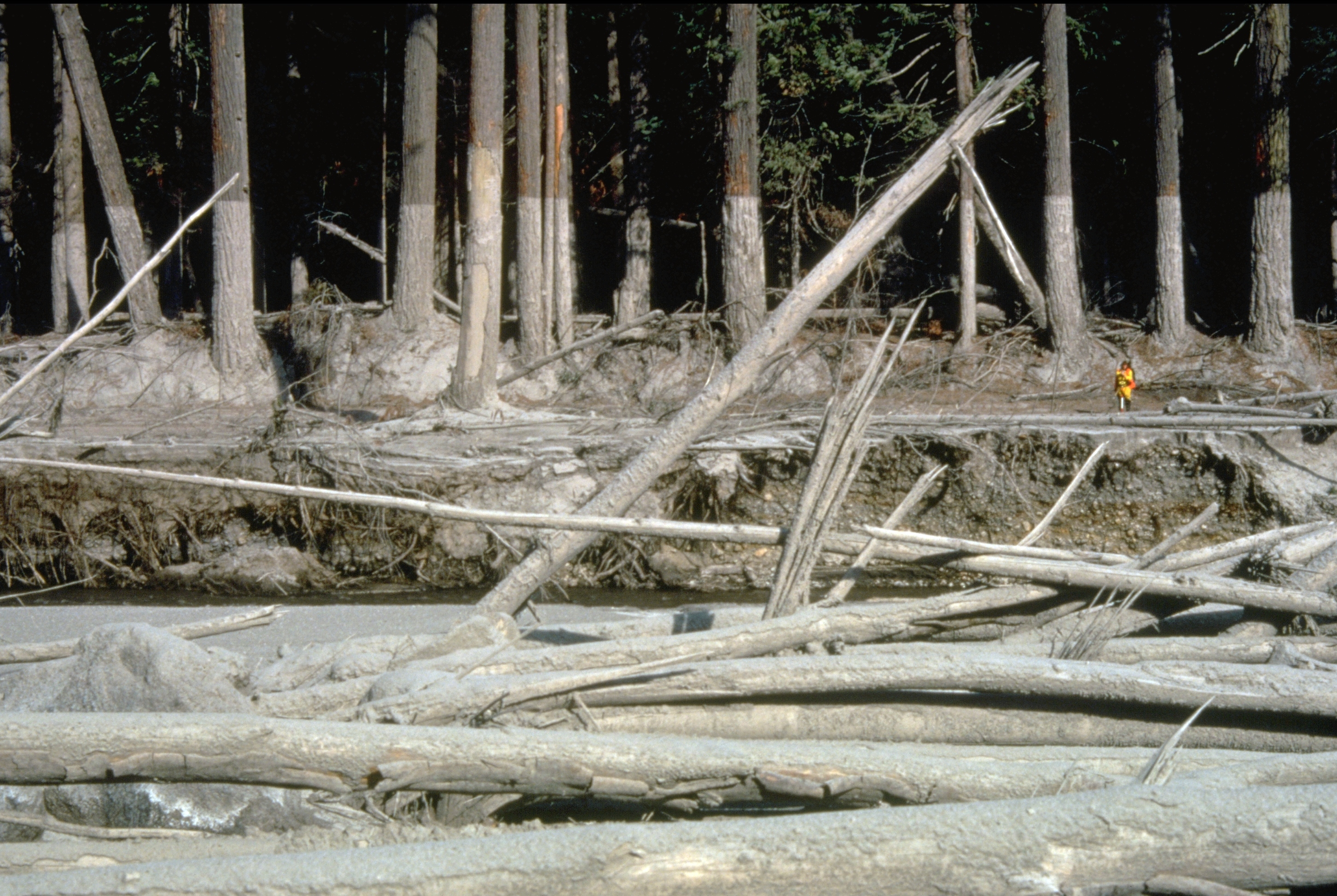
Mudline next to Muddy River from the 1980 lahars

The hot, exploding material also broke apart and melted nearly all of the mountain's glaciers, along with most of the overlying snow. As in many previous St. Helens eruptions, this created huge lahars (volcanic mudflows) and muddy floods that affected three of the four stream drainage systems on the mountain, and which started to move as early as 8:50 am. Lahars travelled as fast as 90 mph (140 km/h) while still high on the volcano, but progressively slowed to about 3 mph (4.8 km/h) on the flatter and wider parts of rivers. Mudflows from the southern and eastern flanks had the consistency of wet concrete as they raced down Muddy River, Pine Creek, and Smith Creek to their confluence at the Lewis River. Bridges were taken out at the mouth of Pine Creek and the head of Swift Reservoir, which rose 2.6 ft (0.79 m) by noon to accommodate the nearly 18,000,000 yd^{3} (14,000,000 m^{3}) of additional water, mud, and debris.

Glacier and snowmelt mixed with tephra on the volcano's northeast slope to create much larger lahars. These mudflows traveled down the north and south forks of the Toutle River and joined at the confluence of the Toutle forks and the Cowlitz River near Castle Rock, Washington, at 1:00 pm. Ninety minutes after the eruption, the first mudflow had moved 27 mi (43 km) upstream, where observers at Weyerhaeuser's Camp Baker saw a 12 ft-high (4 m) wall of muddy water and debris pass. Near the confluence of the Toutle's north and south forks at Silver Lake, a record flood stage of 23.5 ft (7.2 m) was recorded.

A large but slower-moving mudflow with a mortar-like consistency was mobilized in early afternoon at the head of the Toutle River north fork. By 2:30 pm the massive mudflow had destroyed Camp Baker, and in the following hours, seven bridges were carried away. Part of the flow backed up for 2.5 mi (4.0 km) soon after entering the Cowlitz River, but most continued downstream. After traveling 17 mi (27 km) further, an estimated 3,900,000 yd^{3} (3,000,000 m^{3}) of material were injected into the Columbia River, reducing the river's depth by 25 ft (8 m) for a 4 mi (6 km) stretch. The resulting 13 ft (4.0 m) river depth temporarily closed the busy channel to ocean-going freighters, costing Portland, Oregon, an estimated $5 million (equivalent to $16.4 million 2025). Ultimately, more than 65×10^{6} yd^{3} (50×10^{6} m^{3}; 1.8×10^{9} ft^{3}) of sediment were dumped along the lower Cowlitz and Columbia Rivers.

== Aftermath ==
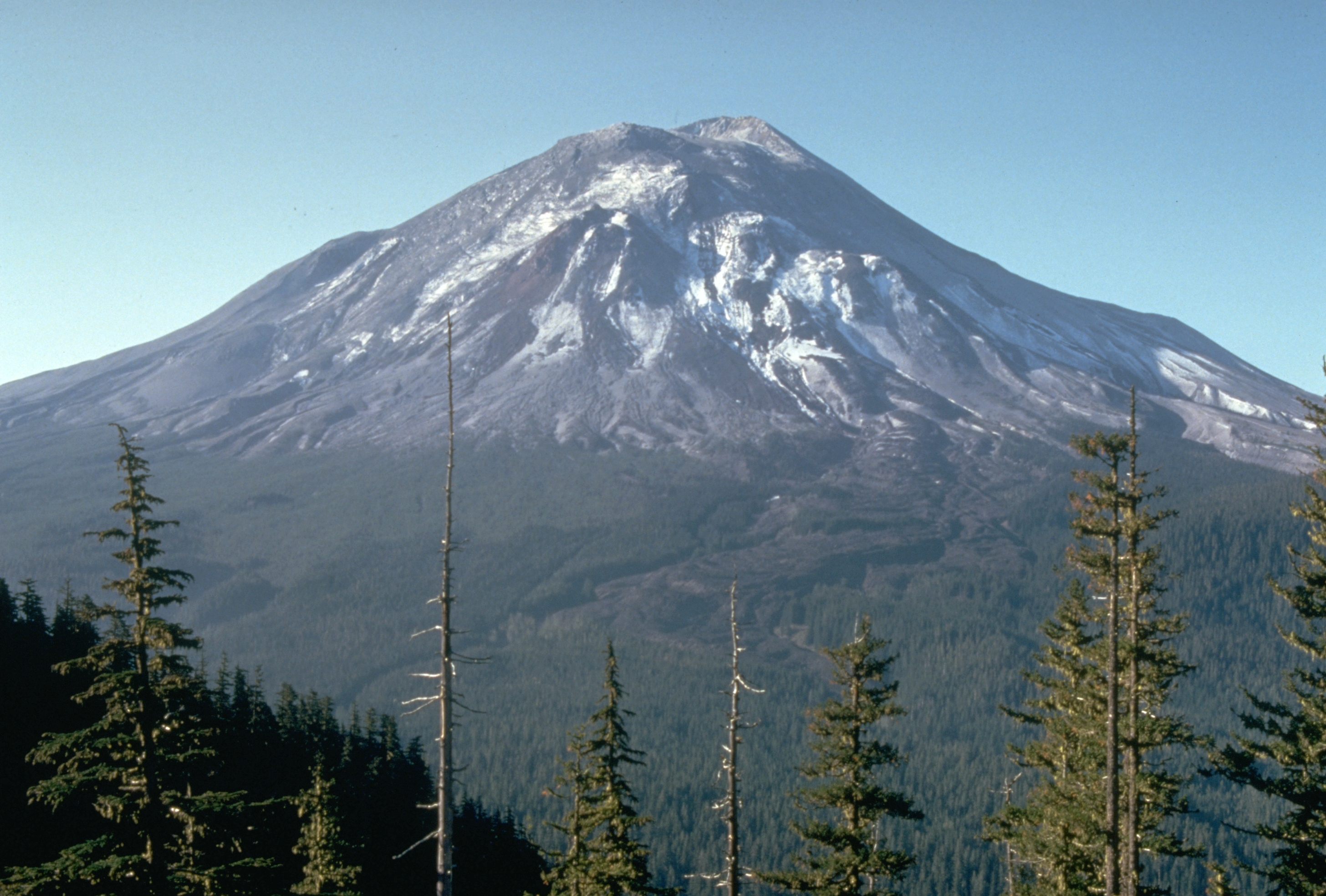
Mount St. Helens as seen on May 17, 1980 one day before the eruption, photographed from the Johnston ridge

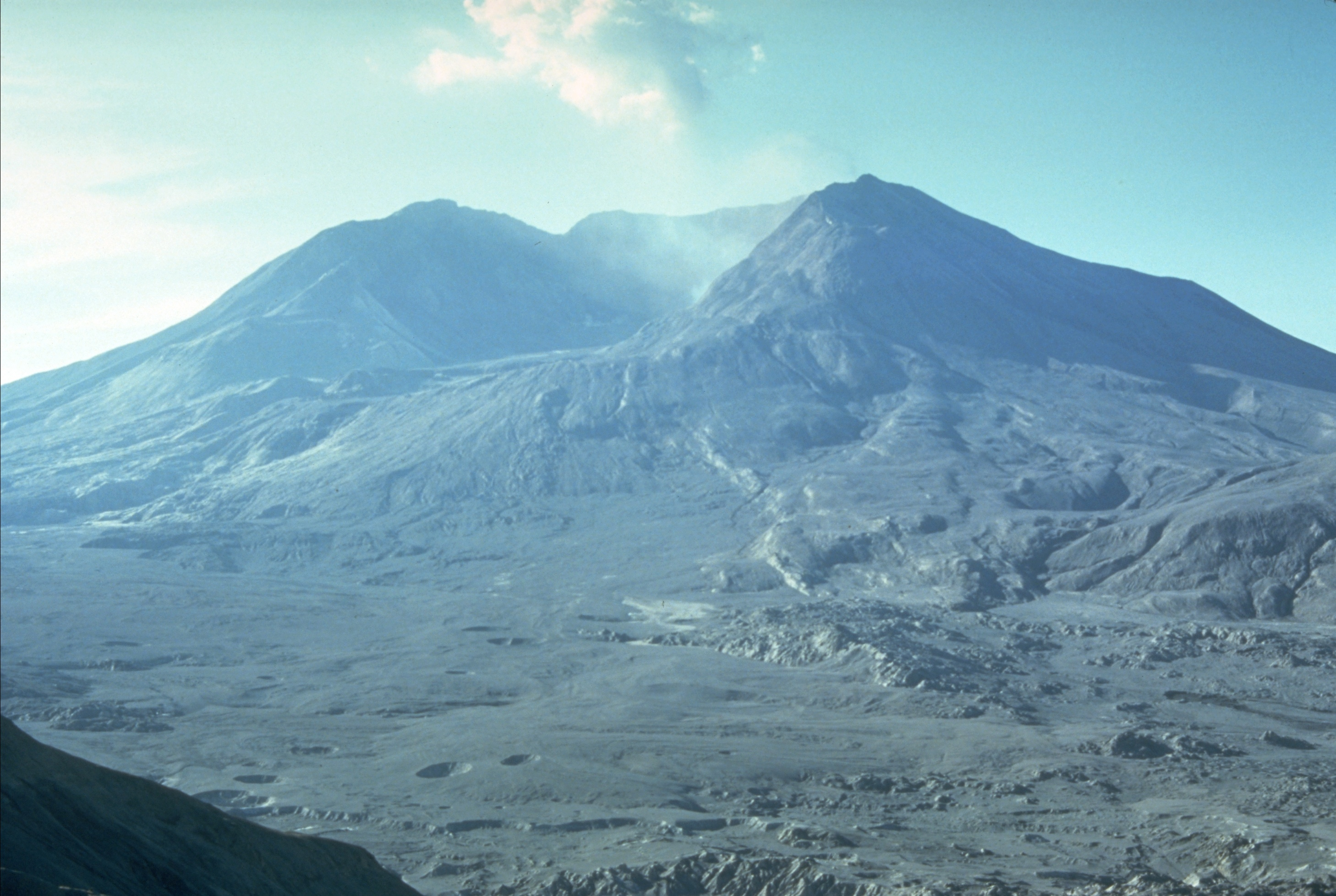
Mount St. Helens in September 1980 approximately four months after the eruption, photographed from roughly the same location as the earlier picture. Note the barrenness of the terrain as compared to the image above.

=== Direct results ===
The May 18, 1980, event was the most deadly and economically destructive volcanic eruption in the history of the contiguous United States. About 57 people were killed directly from the blast, and 200 houses, 47 bridges, 15 mi (24 km) of railways, and 185 mi (298 km) of highway were destroyed; two people were killed indirectly in accidents that resulted from poor visibility, and two more suffered fatal heart attacks from shoveling ash. U.S. President Jimmy Carter surveyed the damage, and said it looked more desolate than a moonscape.

A film crew was dropped by helicopter on Mount St. Helens on May 23 to document the destruction, but they quickly became lost, which the crew attributed to “magnetism in the ash and our contour maps made meaningless on the altered slopes”. A second eruption occurred the next day (see below), but the crew survived and were rescued two days after that. The eruption ejected more than 1 mi^{3} (4.2 km^{3}) of material. A quarter of that volume was fresh lava in the form of ash, pumice, and volcanic bombs, while the rest was fragmented, older rock. The removal of the north side of the mountain (13% of the cone's volume) reduced Mount St. Helens' height by about 1,300 ft (400 m) and left a crater 1 to 2 mi (1.6 to 3.2 km) wide and 2,100 ft (640 m) deep with its north end open in a huge breach.

More than 4,000,000,000 board feet (9,400,000 m^{3}) of timber were damaged or destroyed, mainly by the lateral blast. At least 25% of the destroyed timber was salvaged after September 1980. Downwind of the volcano, in areas of thick ash accumulation, many agricultural crops, such as wheat, apples, potatoes, and alfalfa, were destroyed. As many as 1,500 elk and 5,000 deer were killed, and an estimated twelve million Chinook and Coho salmon fingerlings died when their hatcheries were destroyed. Another estimated 40,000 young salmon were killed when they swam through turbine blades of hydroelectric generators after reservoir levels were lowered along the Lewis River to accommodate possible mudflows and flood waters.

In total, Mount St. Helens released 24 megatons TNT of thermal energy, seven of which were a direct result of the blast. This is equivalent to 1,600 times the size of the atomic bomb dropped on Hiroshima.

In 2024, a study was conducted that provided an explanation for the observed phenomenon of an increase in the duration of the Lamb waves compared to the expected.

==== Uncertain death toll ====
The death toll most commonly cited is 57, although two points of uncertainty remain.

The first point regards two officially listed victims, Paul Hiatt and Dale Thayer. They were reported missing after the explosion. In the aftermath, investigators were able to locate individuals named Paul Hiatt and Dale Thayer who were alive and well. However, they were unable to determine who reported Hiatt missing, and the person who was listed as reporting Thayer missing claimed she was not the one who had done so. Since the investigators could not thus verify that they were the same Hiatt and Thayer who were reported missing, the names remain listed among the presumed dead.

The second point regards three missing people who are not officially listed as victims: Robert Ruffle, Steven Whitsett, and Mark Melanson. Cowlitz County Emergency Services Management lists them as "Possibly Missing — Not on [the official] List". According to Melanson's brother, in October 1983, Cowlitz County officials told his family that Melanson "is believed [...] a victim of the May 18, 1980, eruption" and that after years of searching, the family eventually decided "he's buried in the ash".

Taking these two points of uncertainty into consideration, the direct death toll could be as low as 55 or as high as 60. When combined with the four indirect victims (two dying from vehicle accidents due to poor visibility, and two dying from heart attacks triggered by shovelling ash) those numbers range from 59 to 64.

A year and a half after the eruption, the bodies of two young women, Marsha Anne Weatter and Katherine Jean Allen, 18 and 20 years old respectively, were discovered. They were believed to have been murdered six weeks before the eruption, rather than being killed by the events. Backpacks belonging to them had been found in July 1980, but a layer of ash deposited by the eruption may have hidden the bodies, also preventing animals disturbing the remains. An autopsy showed they had each been shot once. The murders of Weatter and Allen were later linked to serial killer Martin Lee Sanders.

=== Ash damage and removal ===
Map of ash distribution over the United States

The ash fall created some temporary major problems with transportation, sewage disposal, and water treatment systems. Visibility was greatly decreased during the ash fall, closing many highways and roads. Interstate 90 from Seattle to Spokane was closed for a week and a half. Air travel was disrupted for between a few days and two weeks, as several airports in eastern Washington shut down because of ash accumulation and poor visibility. Over a thousand commercial flights were cancelled following airport closures. Fine-grained, gritty ash caused substantial problems for internal combustion engines and other mechanical and electrical equipment. The ash contaminated oil systems, clogged air filters, and scratched moving surfaces. Fine ash caused short circuits in electrical transformers, which in turn caused power blackouts.

Removing and disposing of the ash was a monumental task for some Eastern Washington communities. State and federal agencies estimated that over 2,400,000 yd^{3} (1,800,000 m^{3}) of ash, equivalent to about 900,000 tons in weight, were removed from highways and airports in Washington. The ash removal cost $2.2 million and took ten weeks in Yakima. The need to remove ash quickly from transport routes and civil works dictated the selection of some disposal sites. Some cities used old quarries and existing sanitary landfills; others created dump sites wherever expedient. To minimize wind reworking of ash dumps, the surfaces of some disposal sites were covered with topsoil and seeded with grass. In Portland, the mayor eventually threatened businesses with fines if they failed to remove the ash from their parking lots.

=== Cost ===
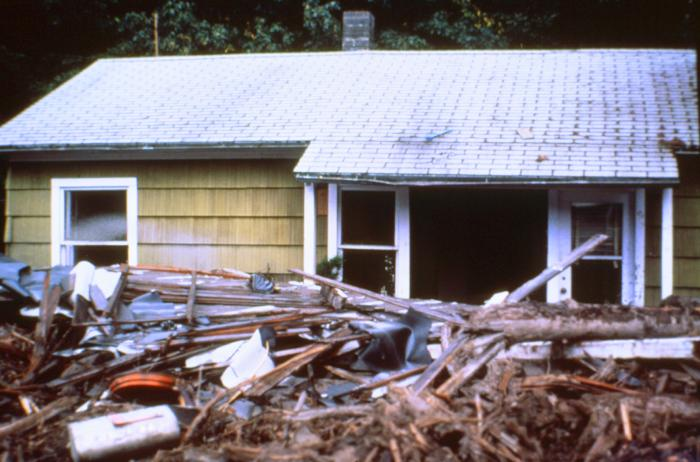
One of the 200 houses destroyed by the eruption

A refined estimate of $1.1 billion ($3.6 billion in 2025) was determined in a study by the International Trade Commission at the request of the U.S. Congress. A supplemental appropriation of $951 million for disaster relief was voted by Congress, of which the largest share went to the Small Business Administration, the U.S. Army Corps of Engineers, and the Federal Emergency Management Agency.

Also, indirect and intangible costs of the eruption were incurred. Unemployment in the immediate region of Mount St. Helens rose 10-fold in the weeks immediately following the eruption, and then returned to near-normal levels once timber-salvaging and ash-cleanup operations were underway. Only a small percentage of residents left the region because of lost jobs owing to the eruption. Several months after May 18, a few residents reported suffering stress and emotional problems, though they had coped successfully during the crisis. Counties in the region requested funding for mental-health programs to assist such people.

Initial public reaction to the May 18 eruption dealt a nearly crippling blow to tourism, an important industry in Washington. Not only was tourism down in the Mount St. Helens–Gifford Pinchot National Forest area, but conventions, meetings and social gatherings also were cancelled or postponed at cities and resorts elsewhere in Washington and neighboring Oregon not affected by the eruption. The adverse effect on tourism and conventioneering, however, proved only temporary. Mount St. Helens, perhaps because of its reawakening, has regained its appeal for tourists. The U.S. Forest Service and the State of Washington opened visitor centers and provided access for people to view the volcano's devastation.

== Later eruptions ==
St. Helens produced an additional five explosive eruptions between May and October 1980. Through early 1990, at least 21 periods of eruptive activity occurred. The volcano remains active, with smaller, dome-building eruptions continuing into 2008.

=== 1980–1991 ===
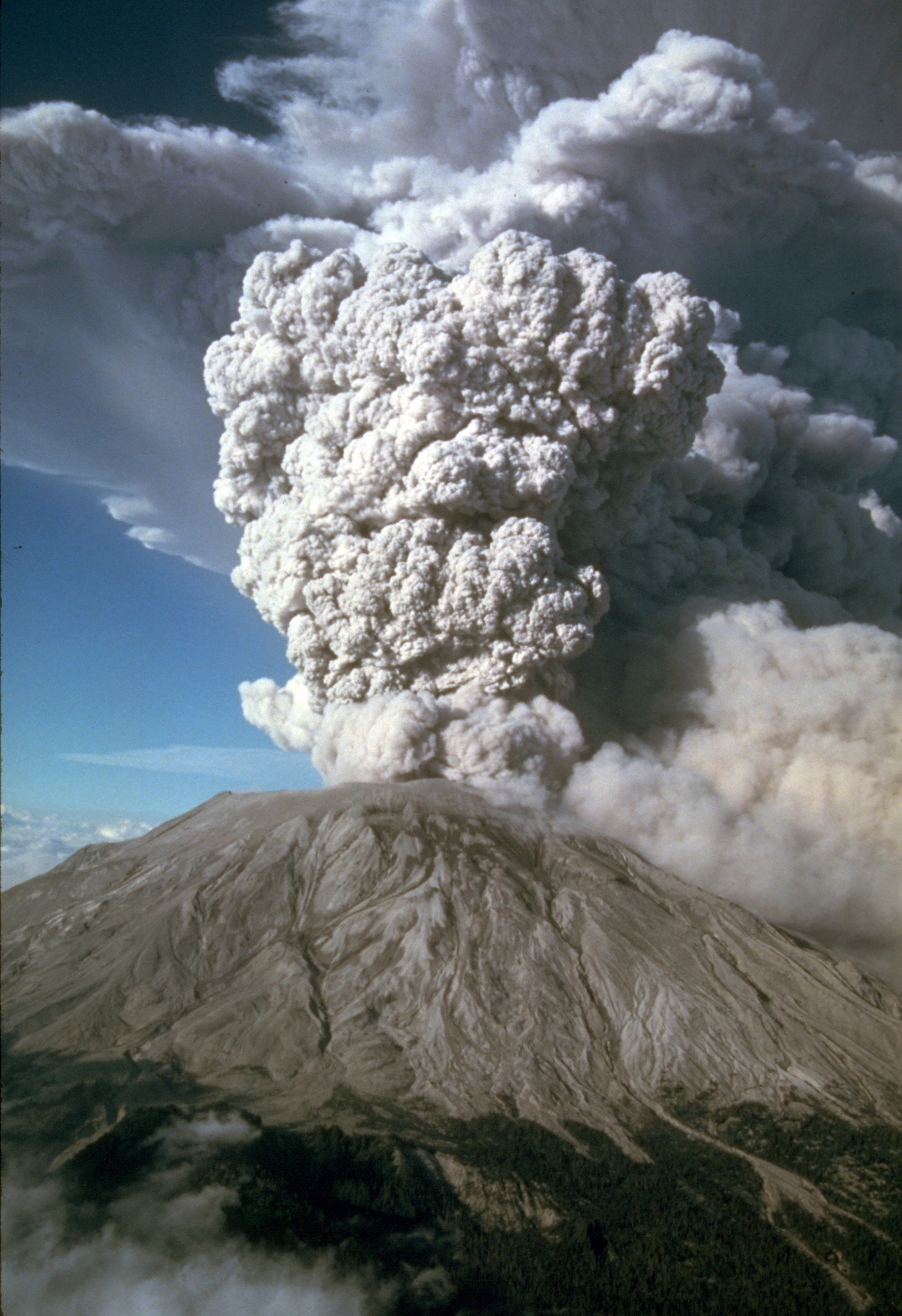
Eruption on July 22, 1980

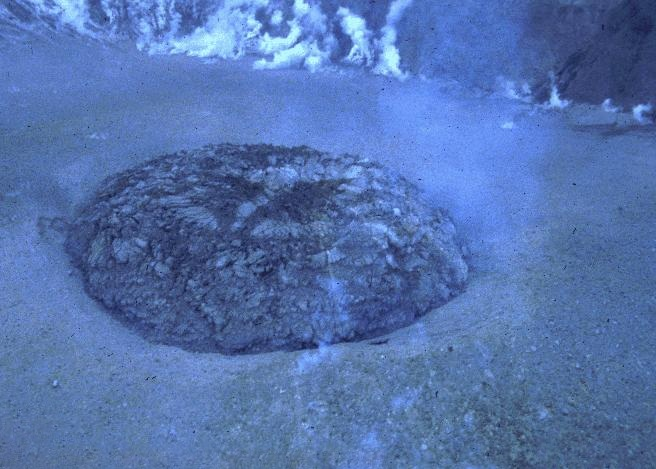
The growing third dome on October 24, 1980

An eruption occurred on May 25, 1980, at 2:30am that sent an ash column 9 mi (48,000 ft; 14 km) into the atmosphere. The eruption was preceded by a sudden increase in earthquake activity, and occurred during a rainstorm. Erratic wind from the storm carried ash from the eruption to the south and west, lightly dusting large parts of western Washington and Oregon. Pyroclastic flows exited the northern breach and covered avalanche debris, lahars, and other pyroclastic flows deposited by the May 18 eruption.

At 7:05 pm on June 12, a plume of ash billowed 2.5 mi (4.0 km) above the volcano. At 9:09 pm, a much stronger explosion sent an ash column about 10 mi (16 km) skyward. This event caused the Portland area, previously spared by wind direction, to be thinly coated with ash in the middle of the annual Rose Festival. A dacite dome then oozed into existence on the crater floor, growing to a height of 200 ft (61 m) and a width of 1,200 ft (370 m) within a week.

A series of large explosions on July 22 broke more than a month of relative quiet. The July eruptive episode was preceded by several days of measurable expansion of the summit area, heightened earthquake activity, and changed emission rates of sulfur dioxide and carbon dioxide. The first hit at 5:14 pm as an ash column shot 10 mi (16 km) and was followed by a faster blast at 6:25 pm that pushed the ash column above its previous maximum height in just 7.5 minutes. The final explosion started at 7:01 pm, and continued over two hours. When the relatively small amount of ash settled over eastern Washington, the dome built in June was gone.

Seismic activity and gas emission steadily increased in early August, and on August 7 at 4:26 pm an ash cloud slowly expanded 8 mi (13 km) into the sky. Small pyroclastic flows came through the northern breach and a weaker outpouring of ash rose from the crater. This continued until 10:32 pm, when a second large blast sent ash high into the air, proceeding due north. A second dacite dome filled this vent a few days later.

Two months of repose were ended by an eruption lasting from October 16 to 18. This event obliterated the second dome, sent ash ten miles in the air, and created small, red-hot pyroclastic flows. A third dome began to form within thirty minutes after the final explosion on October 18, and within a few days it was about 900 ft (270 m) wide and 130 ft (40 m) high. In spite of the dome growth next to it, a new glacier formed rapidly inside the crater.

All of the post-1980 eruptions were quiet dome-building events, beginning with the December 27, 1980, to January 3, 1981, episode. By 1987 the third dome had grown to be more than 3,000 ft (910 m) wide and 800 ft (240 m) high.

Further eruptions occurred over a few months between 1989 and 1991.

=== 2004–2008 ===
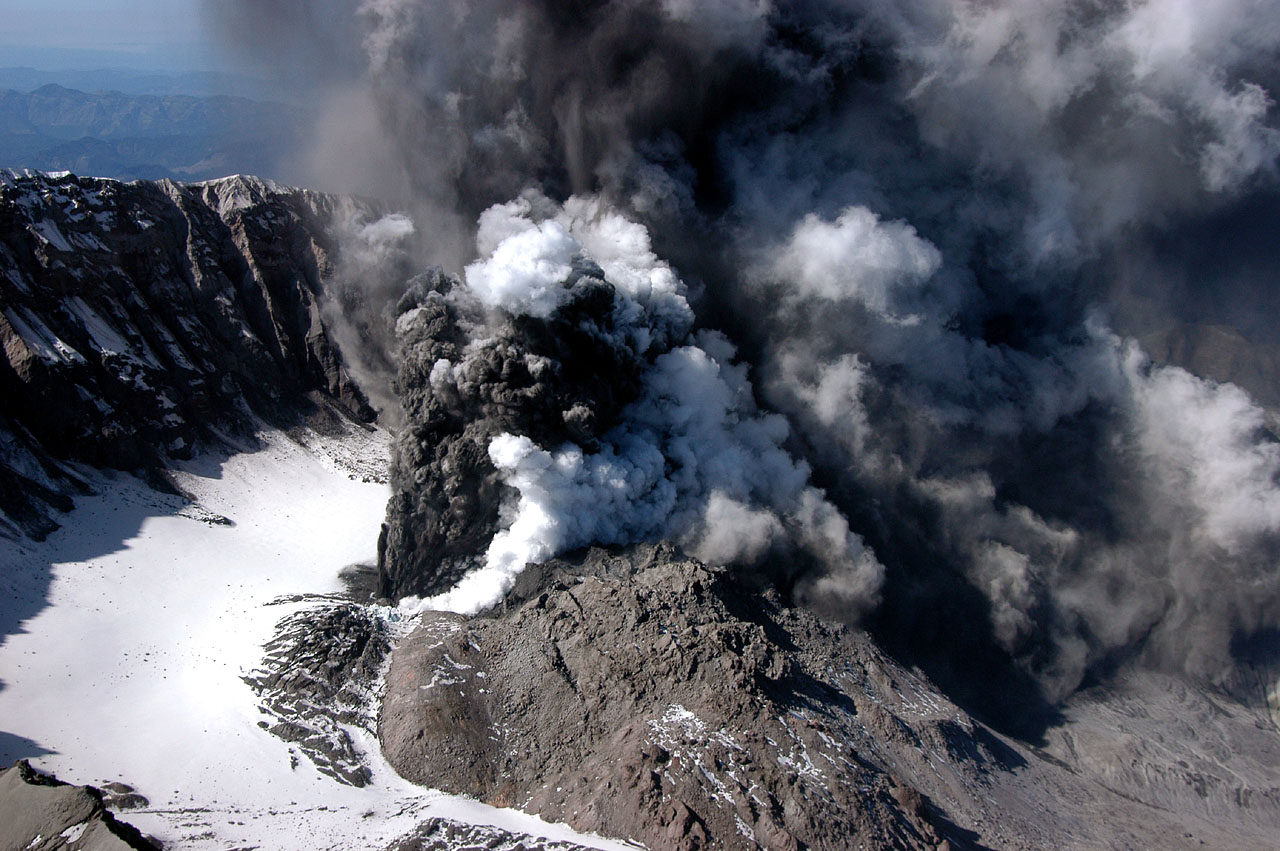
Plume of volcanic ash and steam in the October 2004 eruption

The 2004–2008 volcanic activity of Mount St. Helens has been documented as a continuous eruption with a gradual extrusion of magma at the Mount St. Helens volcano. Starting in October 2004, a gradual building of a new lava dome happened. The new dome did not rise above the crater created by the 1980 eruption. This activity lasted until January 2008.

Satellite images before and after 1980 eruption

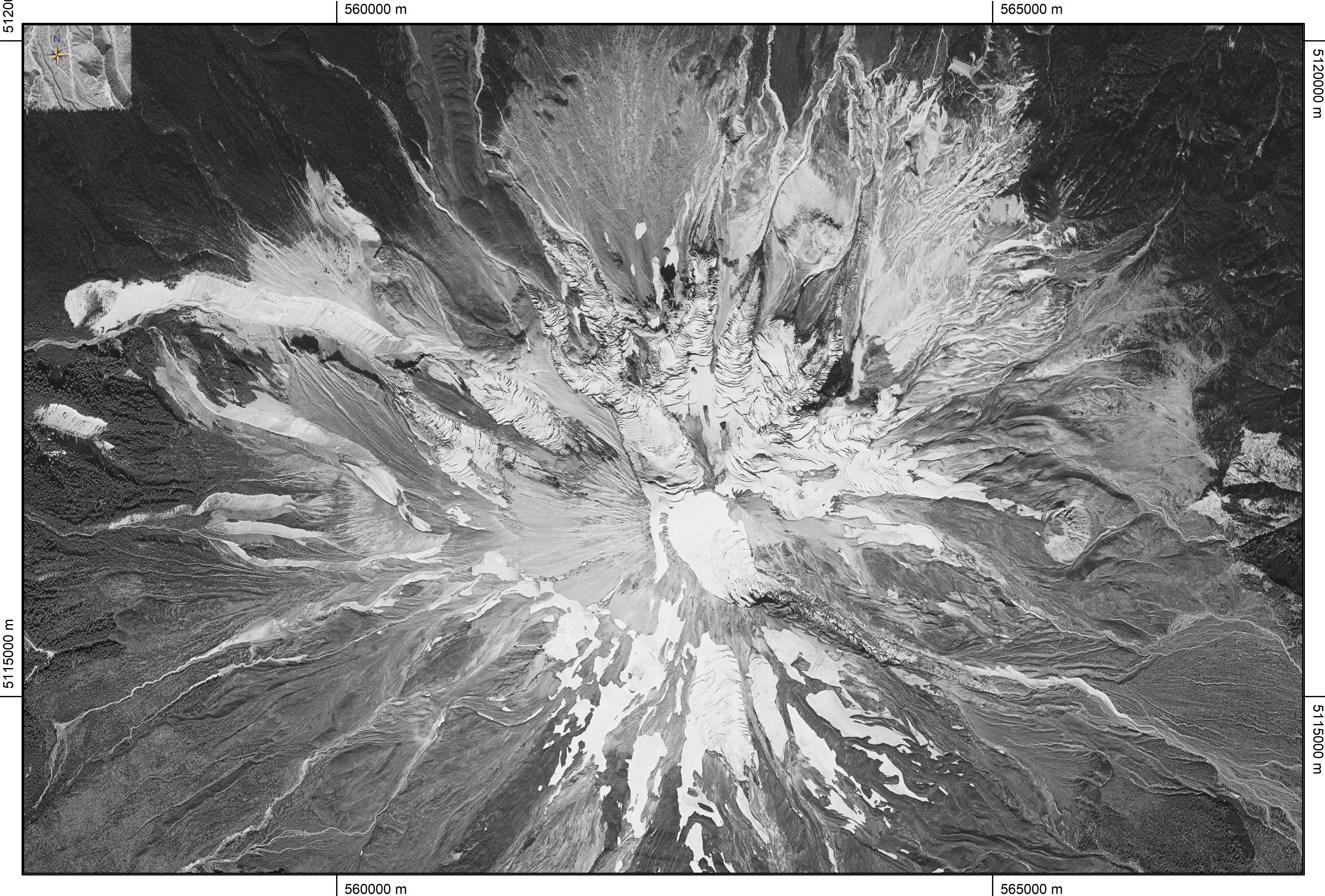
Satellite image of Mount St. Helens before eruption (July 23, 1975)

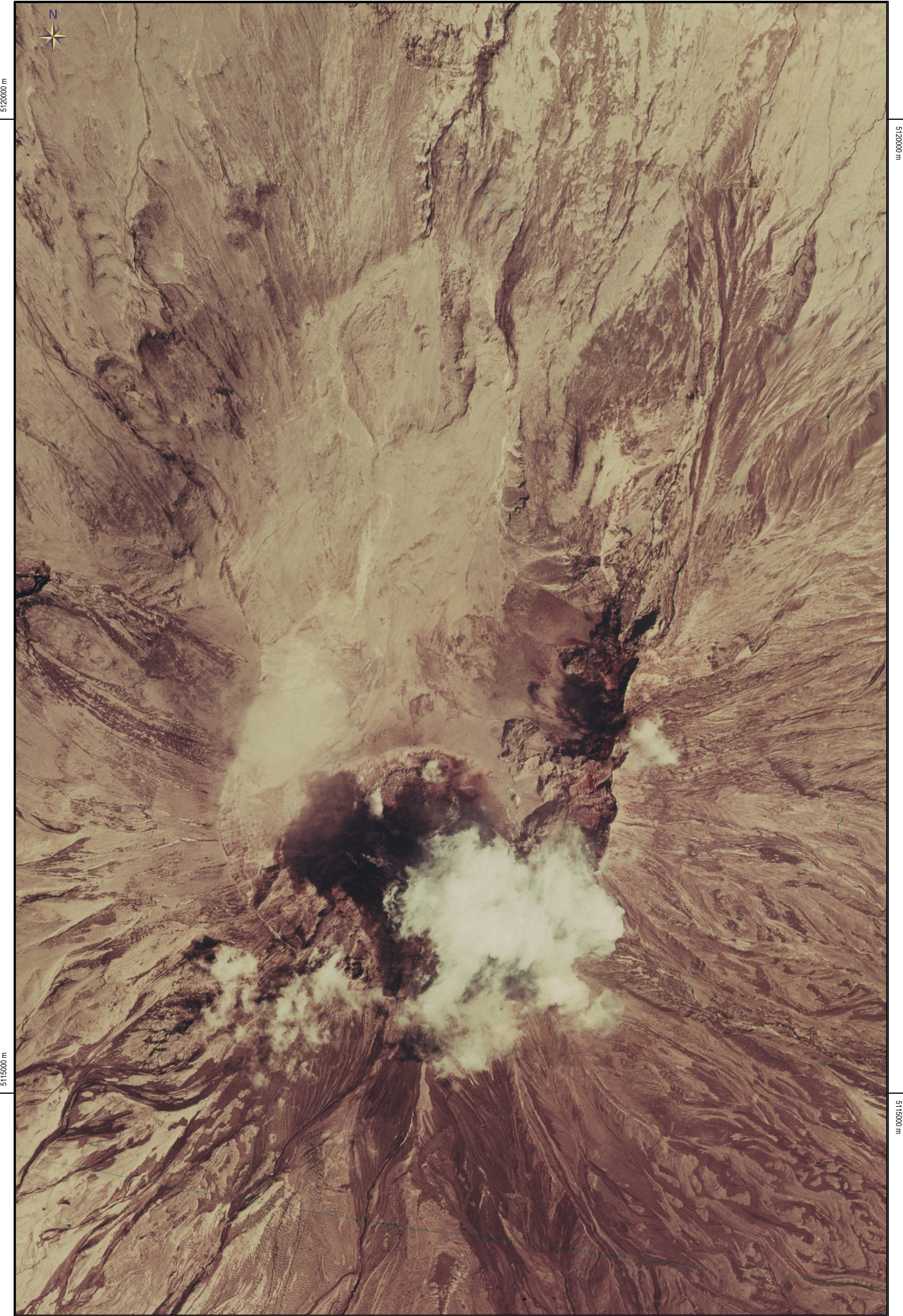
Satellite image of Mount St. Helens crater June 30, 1980 (color infrared)

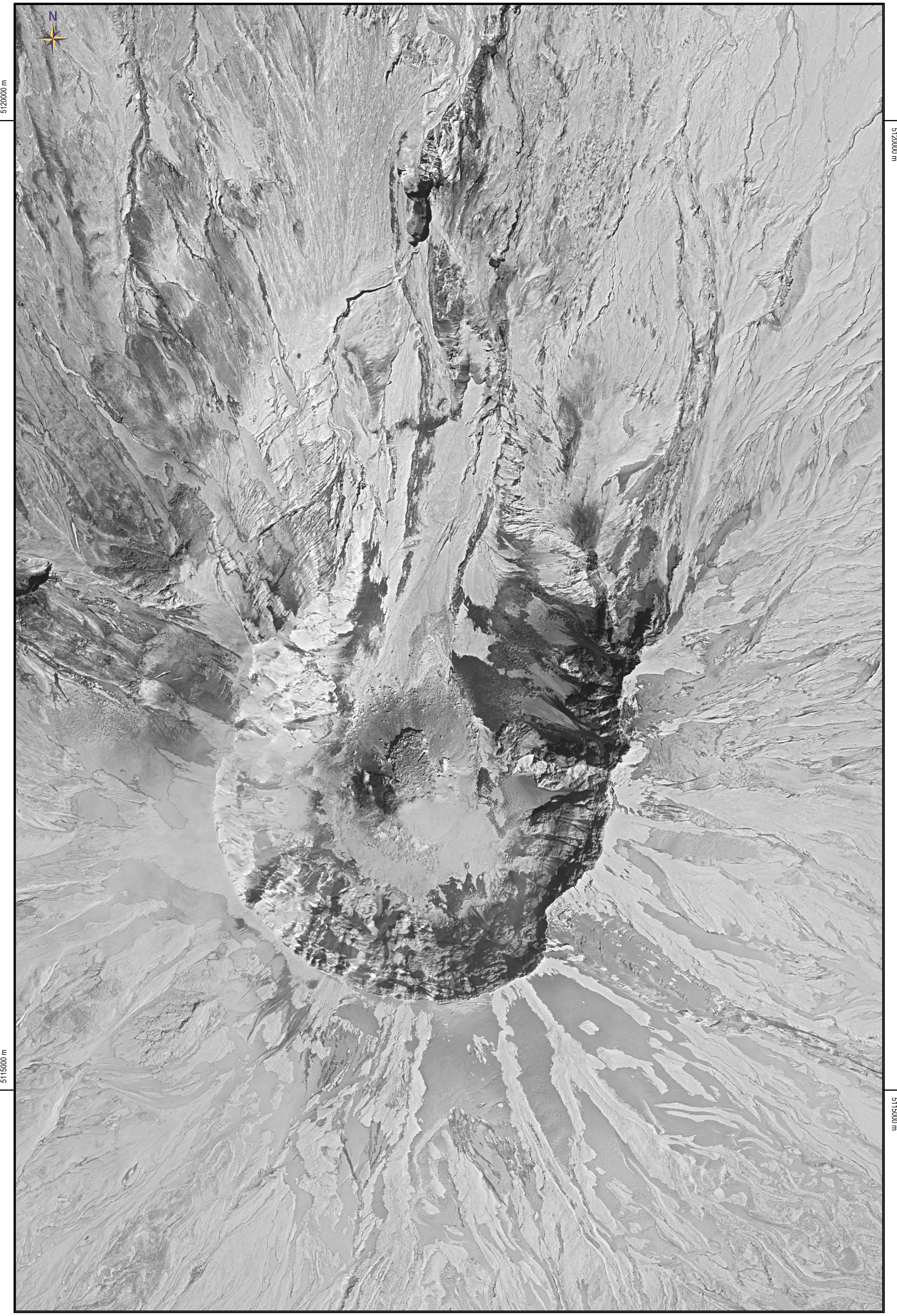
Satellite image of Mount St. Helens crater (July 22, 1982)
Elevation models and landscape (lava domes) change models of Mount St. Helens (crater) between 1982 and 2017

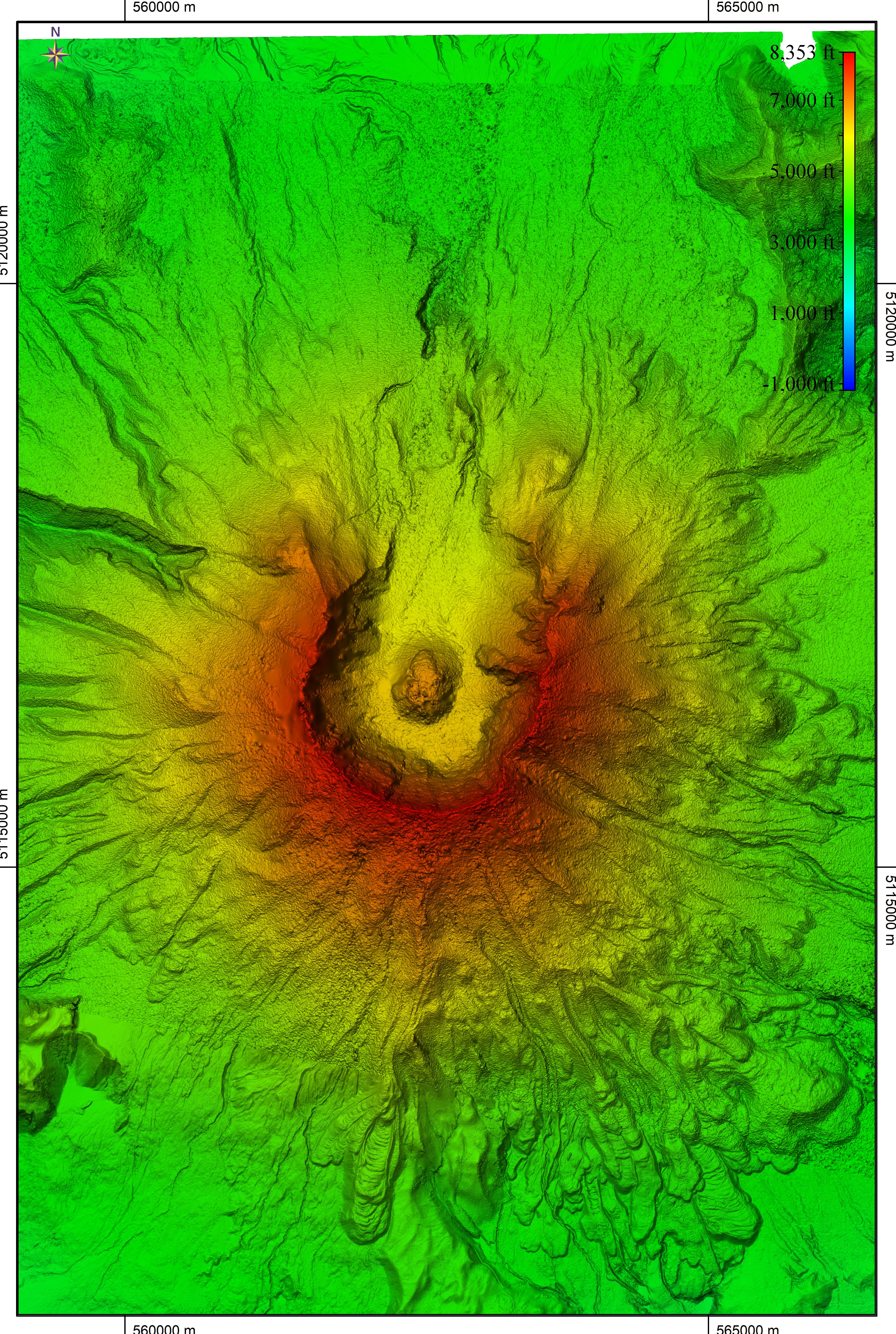
Digital elevation model (DEM) of Mount St. Helens (1982)

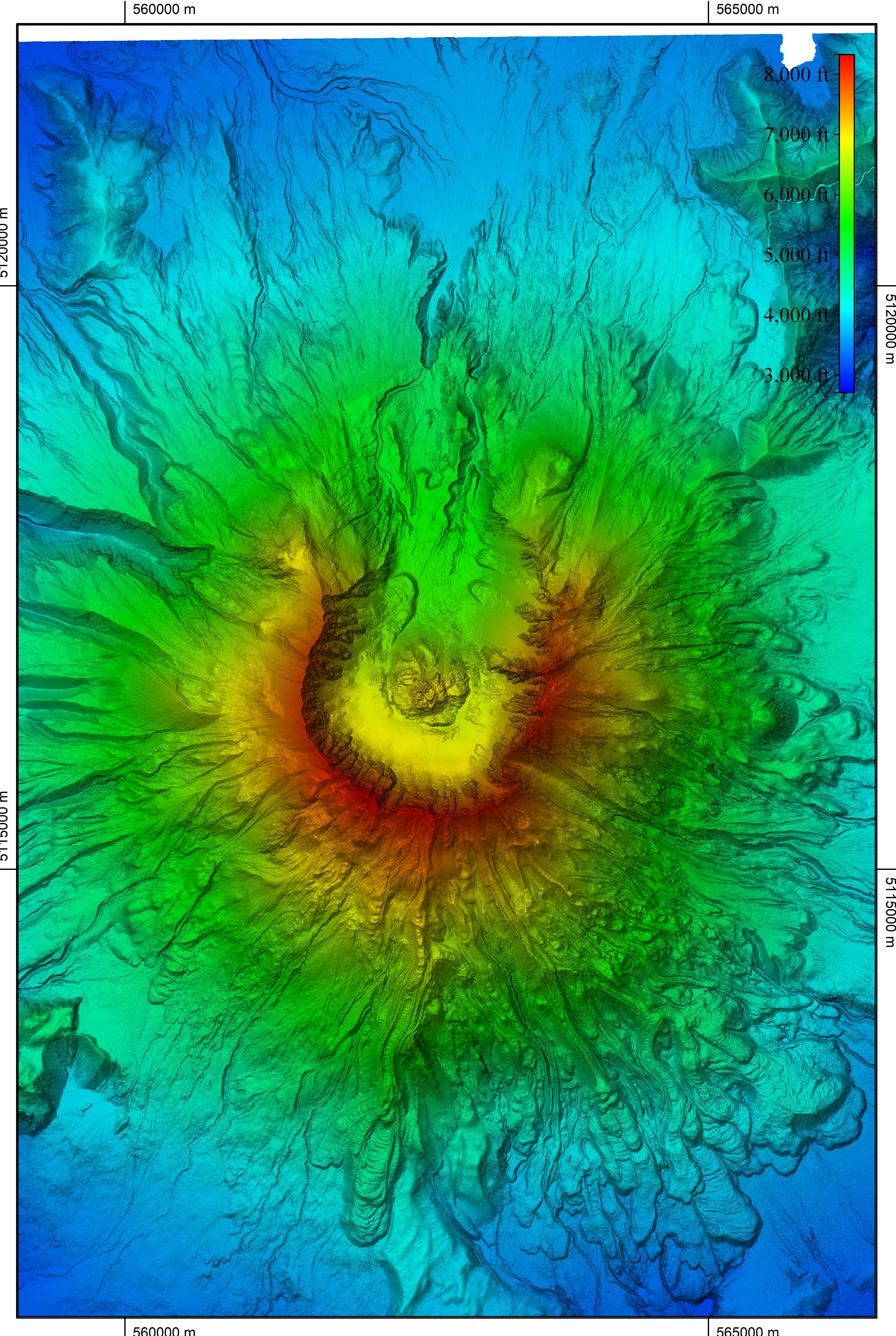
DEM of Mount St. Helens (2003)

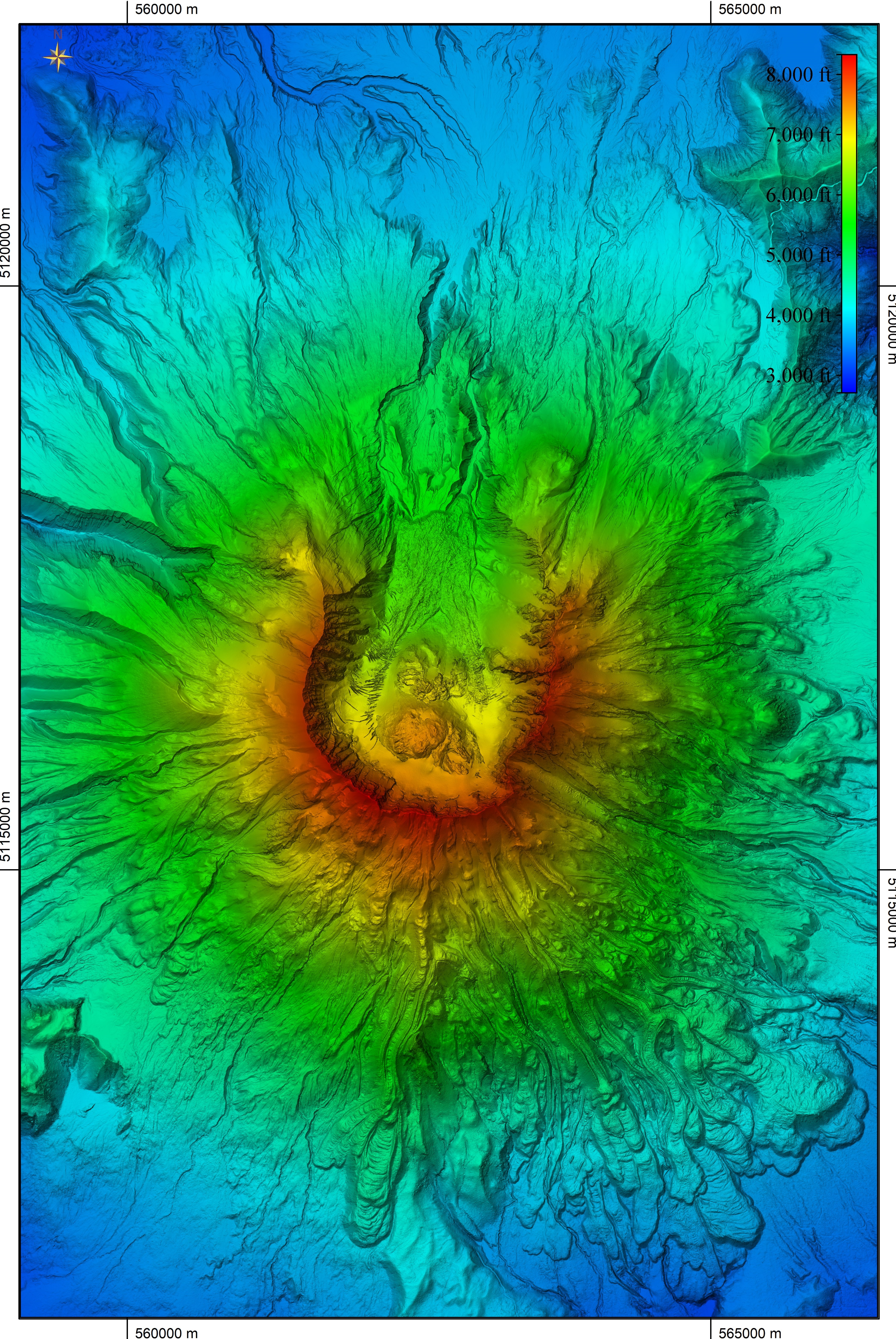
DEM of Mount St. Helens (2017)

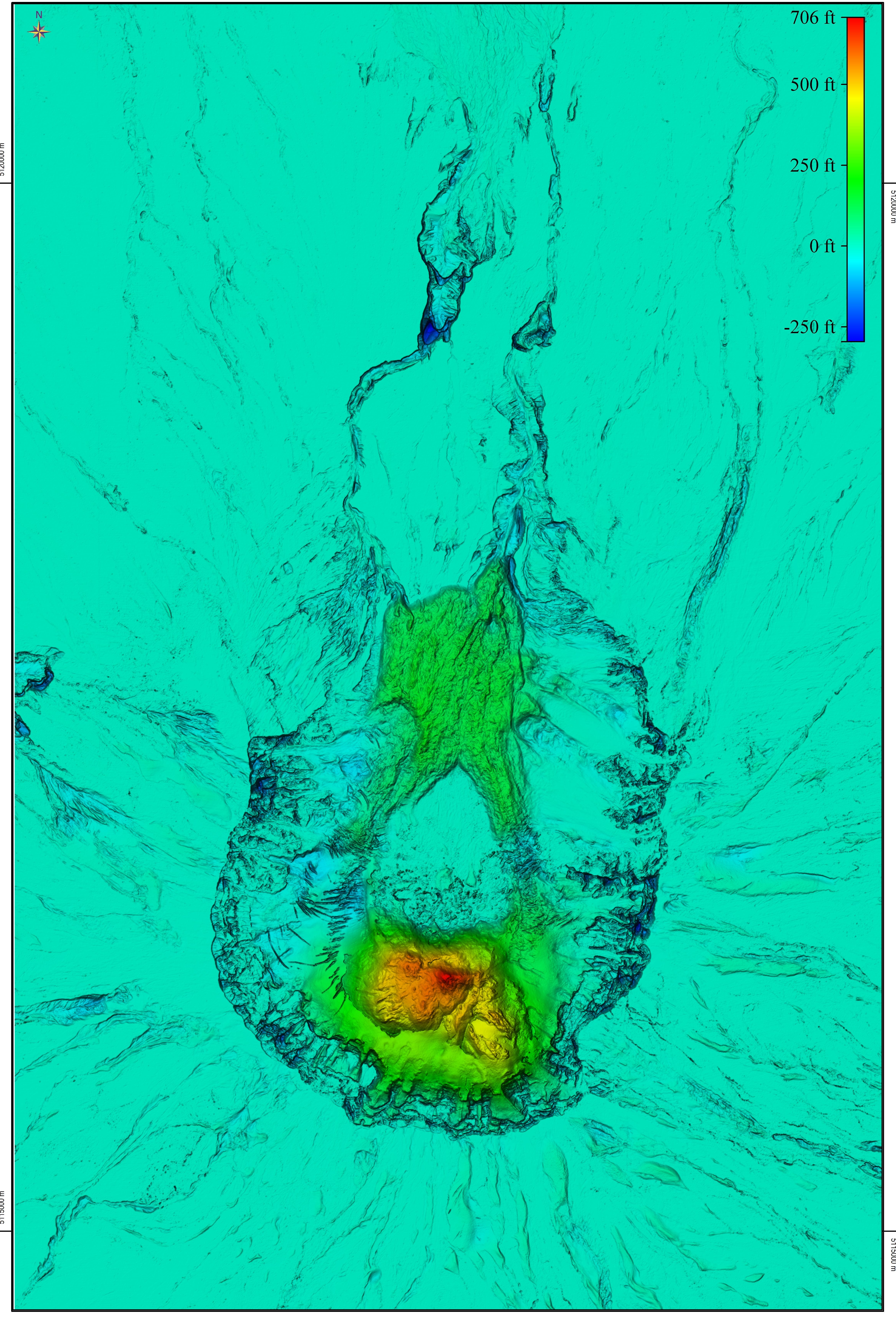
Lava domes growth and landscape change of Mount St. Helens 2002–2017

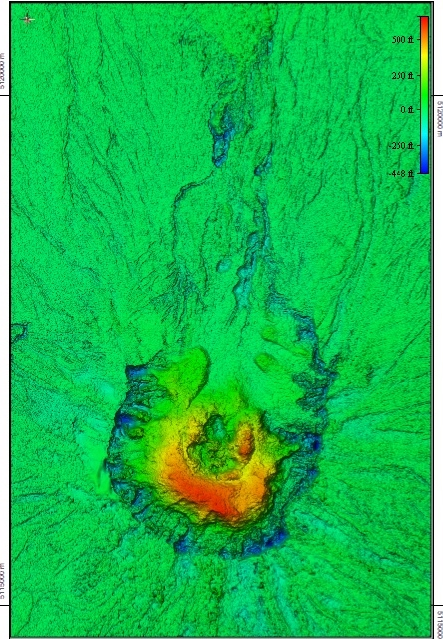
Lava domes growth and landscape change of Mount St. Helens 1982–2003

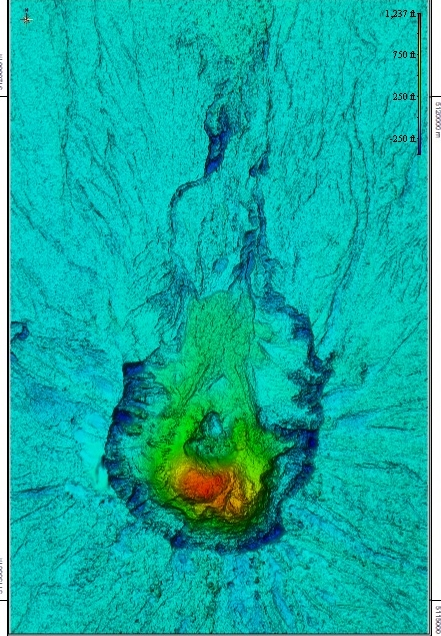
Lava domes growth and landscape change of Mount St. Helens 1982–2017

== Summary table ==
Eruption summary May 18, 1980, eruption of Mount St. Helens
Elevation of summit:	Before eruption:	9,677 ft (2,950 m)
Elevation of summit:	After eruption:	8,363 ft (2,549 m)
Elevation of summit:	Total removed:	1,314 ft (401 m)
Crater dimensions:	East-West:	1.2 mi (1.9 km)
Crater dimensions:	North-South:	1.8 mi (2.9 km)
Crater dimensions:	Depth:	2,084 ft (635 m)
Crater floor elevation:		6,279 ft (1,914 m)
Eruption	Date:	May 18, 1980
Eruption	Time of initial blast:	8:32 am Pacific Daylight Time (UTC−7)
Eruption	Eruption trigger:	A magnitude 5.1 earthquake about 1 mi (1.6 km) beneath the volcano
Landslide and debris avalanche	Area covered:	23 sq mi (60 km^{2})
Landslide and debris avalanche	Volume: (uncompacted deposits)	0.67 mi^{3} (2.8 km^{3})
Landslide and debris avalanche	Depth of deposit:	Buried North Fork Toutle River to average depth of 150 ft (46 m) with a maximum depth of 600 ft (183 m)
Landslide and debris avalanche	Speed:	70 to 150 mph (113 to 241 km/h)
Lateral blast	Area covered:	230 sq mi (596 km^{2}); reached 17 mi (27 km) northwest of the crater
Lateral blast	Volume of deposit: (uncompacted deposits)	0.046 mi^{3} (0.19 km^{3})
Lateral blast	Depth of deposit:	From about 3 ft (1 m) at volcano to less than 1 in (2.5 cm) at blast edge
Lateral blast	Speed:	At least 300 mph (480 km/h)
Lateral blast	Temperature:	As high as 660 °F (350 °C)
Lateral blast	Energy release:	24 megatons thermal energy (7 by blast, rest through release of heat)
Lateral blast	Trees blown down:	4,000,000,000 board feet (9,400,000 m^{3}) of timber (enough to build about 300,000 two-bedroom homes)
Lateral blast	Human fatalities:	55-60 (direct); four (indirect); 59-64 (total)
Lahars	Speed:	About 10 to 25 mph (16 to 40 km/h) and over 50 mph (80 km/h) on steep flanks of volcano
Lahars	Damaged:	27 bridges, nearly 200 homes: Blast and lahars destroyed more than 185 mi (298 km) of highways and roads and 15 mi (24 km) of railways.
Lahars	Effects on Cowlitz River:	Reduced carrying capacity at flood stage at Castle Rock from 76,000 ft^{3} (2,200 m^{3}) per second to less than 15,000 ft^{3} (420 m^{3}) per second.
Lahars	Effects on Columbia River:	Reduced channel depth from 40 to 14 ft (12 to 4 m); stranded 31 ships in upstream ports
Eruption column and cloud	Height:	Reached about 80,000 ft (24,400 m) in less than 15 minutes
Eruption column and cloud	Downwind extent:	Spread across U.S. in 3 days; circled Earth in 15 days
Eruption column and cloud	Volume of ash: (based on uncompacted deposits)	0.26 mi^{3} (1.1 km^{3})
Eruption column and cloud	Ash fall area:	Detectable amounts of ash covered 22,000 sq mi (57,000 km^{2})
Eruption column and cloud	Ash fall depth:	10 in (25 cm) at 10 mi (16 km) downwind (ash and pumice); 1 in (2.5 cm) at 60 mi (97 km) downwind 0.5 in (1.3 cm) at 300 mi (480 km) downwind
Pyroclastic flows	Area covered:	6 sq mi (16 km^{2}); reached as far as 5 mi (8 km) north of crater
Pyroclastic flows	Volume and depth: (volume based on uncompacted deposits)	0.029 mi^{3} (0.12 km^{3}); multiple flows 3 to 30 ft (1 to 9 m) thick; cumulative depth of deposits reached 120 ft (37 m) in places
Pyroclastic flows	Speed:	Estimated at 50 to 80 mph (80 to 130 km/h)
Pyroclastic flows	Temperature:	At least 1,300 °F (700 °C)
Other	Wildlife:	The Washington State Department of Game estimated nearly 7,000 big game animals (deer, elk and bear) perished as well as all birds and most small mammals. Many burrowing rodents, frogs, salamanders and crawfish managed to survive because they were below ground level or water surface when the disaster struck.
Other	Fisheries:	The Washington Department of Fisheries estimated that twelve million Chinook and Coho salmon fingerlings were killed when hatcheries were destroyed. Another estimated 40,000 young salmon were lost when forced to swim through turbine blades of hydroelectric generators as reservoir levels along the Lewis River were kept low to accommodate possible mudflows and flooding.
Brantley and Myers, 1997, Mount St. Helens – From the 1980 Eruption to 1996: USGS Fact Sheet 070–97, accessed 2007-06-05; and Tilling, Topinka, and Swanson, 1990, Eruption of Mount St. Helens – Past, Present, and Future: USGS General Interest Publication, accessed 2007-06-05.
Table compiled by Lyn Topinka, USGS/CVO, 1997

== See also ==
- Cascade Volcanoes – High Cascades
- The Eruption of Mount St. Helens! (1980 film) – documentary movie about the eruption
- St. Helens (1981 film) - television movie about the eruption
- Geology of the Pacific Northwest
- Helenite – An artificial glass marketed as a gemstone, made by fusing the volcanic dust from Mount St. Helens' May 1980 eruption
- List of Cascade volcanoes
- List of volcanoes in the United States
- Pacific Ring of Fire
