= List of volcanic eruptions 1500–2000 =

This is a list of notable volcanic eruptions in the 16th to 20th centuries with a volcanic explosivity index (VEI) of 4 or higher, and smaller eruptions that resulted in significant damage or fatalities. Note that there may be uncertainties to dates with historical eruptions, and there are likely to be many large eruptions that have not been identified.

== Large eruptions (VEI of 4 or higher) ==
=== 20th century ===
VEI	Volcano	Country	Year	Fatalities	Notes
4	Ulawun	Papua New Guinea	2000		
4	Mount Tavurvur	Papua New Guinea	1994	5	Tavurvur, and nearby Vulcan, erupted and devastated Rabaul; however, due to planning for such a catastrophe, the townsfolk were prepared and only five people were killed. One of the deaths was caused by lightning, a feature of volcanic ash clouds.
4	Láscar	Chile	1993		
4	Mount Spurr	Alaska, United States	1992		
5	Mount Hudson	Chile	1991		
6	Mount Pinatubo	Philippines	1991	847	Second largest eruption of the 20th century, and largest stratospheric disturbance since the 1883 eruption of Krakatoa. Many deaths were caused by complication of the arrival of Typhoon Yunya.
4	Kelud	Indonesia	1990	32	A strong and explosive eruption in early February 1990 produced a 12 km high column of tephra, heavy tephra falls and several pyroclastic flows. 32 people were killed, over 500 homes and 50 schools were destroyed and many others were damaged.
4	Klyuchevskaya Sopka	Russia	1987		
4	Chikurachki	Russia	1986		
4	Augustine	Alaska, United States	1986		
4	Mount Colo	Indonesia	1983		
4	Galunggung	Indonesia	1982	18	Notable for bringing attention to the dangers of volcanic ash on aircraft after two Boeing 747 jets suffered engine failure from its ash cloud.
5	El Chichón	Mexico	1982	1,900	9 villages were destroyed, killing at least 1,900 people. Ejected 7 million metric tons of sulfur dioxide into the stratosphere.
4	North Pagan	Northern Marianas Islands, United States	1981–1985		
4	Vulkan Alaid	Russia	1981		
5	Mount St. Helens	Washington, United States	1980	57	Most deadly and economically destructive volcanic eruption in the history of the United States. Ash from the eruption reached all the way to Montana. Casualties were limited, owing to the evacuation of the surrounding forest, with exception of loggers who did not depart in time; incinerated in large forest fire that was a result of one of seventeen pyroclastic flows. Sound of eruption could be heard 700 miles (1127 km) away; entire flank of mountain collapsed. Noted for extremely large lahar that flooded the banks of the Toutle River and destroyed several bridges.
4	Augustine	Alaska, United States	1976		
4	Tolbachik	Russia	1975		
4	Volcán de Fuego	Guatemala	1974		
4	Tyatya	Russia	1973		
4	Fernandina	Ecuador	1968		
4	Mount Awu	Indonesia	1966		
4	Kelud	Indonesia	1966		
4	Taal	Philippines	1965		
4	Shiveluch	Russia	1964		
5	Mount Agung	Indonesia	1963	1,584	
5	Bezymianny	Russia	1955–1957		
4	Carran-Los Venados	Chile	1955		
4	Mount Spurr	Alaska, United States	1953		
4	Bagana	Papua New Guinea	1952		
4	Kelud	Indonesia	1951		
4	Mount Lamington	Papua New Guinea	1951	2,942	The only recorded eruption of Mount Lamington devastated Oro Province. Pyroclastic flows caused extreme destruction north of the volcano. Its effects were extensively studied by volcanologist Tony Taylor and his report was published in 1958.
4	Ambrym	Vanuatu	1950		
4	Hekla	Iceland	1947		
4	Sarychev Peak	Russia	1946		
4	Avachinsky	Russia	1945		
4	Parícutin	Mexico	1943–1952	3	1943–1952 eruption of Parícutin
4	Rabaul	Papua New Guinea	1937	507	
4	Kuchinoerabu-jima	Japan	1933–1934	8	8 people were killed and 26 others were injured. Nanakama Village was burned by fire from glowing blocks.
4	Suoh	Indonesia	1933		Occurred two weeks after the 1933 Sumatra earthquake, which produced a surface rupture on the volcano.
5	Kharimkotan	Russia	1933		
5	Cerro Azul	Chile	1932		It is the largest recorded eruption in the history of Chile. The eruption threw ash between the cities of Rancagua and Chillán, leaving them in the dark in broad daylight. The explosions were noticeable in Santiago, 245 km away. Ashes from the eruption were observed in Buenos Aires (capital of Argentina), Montevideo (capital of Uruguay), the south of Brazil and South Africa.
4	Volcán de Fuego	Guatemala	1932		
4	Mount Aniakchak	Alaska, United States	1931		
4	Klyuchevskaya Sopka	Russia	1931		
4	Hokkaidō Koma-ga-take	Japan	1929		
4	Avachinsky	Russia	1926		
5	Submarine Volcano NNE of Iriomote Island	Japan	1924		Submarine Volcano
4	Raikoke	Russia	1924		
4	Manam	Papua New Guinea	1919		
4	Kelud	Indonesia	1919	5,160	Lahars killed over 5,000 people.
4	Katla	Iceland	1918		
4	Tungurahua	Ecuador	1916		
4	Sakurajima	Japan	1914	58	Most powerful eruption in Japan in the twentieth century. The volcano had been dormant for over a century until 1914. Almost all residents had left the island in the previous days; several large earthquakes had warned them that an eruption was imminent. Initially, the eruption was very explosive, generating eruption columns and pyroclastic flows, but after a very large earthquake on 13 January 1914, which killed 58 people, it became effusive, generating a large lava flow.
4	Volcán de Colima	Mexico	1913		
6	Novarupta	Alaska, United States	1912		Largest eruption of the 20th century
4	Lolobau	Papua New Guinea	1911		
5	Ksudach	Russia	1907		
4	Mount Vesuvius	Italy	1875–1906	216	
4	Lolobau	Papua New Guinea	1904		
4	Þórðarhyrna	Iceland	1903		
6	Santa María	Guatemala	1902	6,000	1902 eruption of Santa María
4	Mount Pelée	Island of Martinique, French Overseas Territory, France	1902	33,000	Deadliest eruption of the 20th century and the deadliest natural disaster in the history of France. Destroyed Saint-Pierre, Martinique. Only 2 people survived this eruption, with 1 being held as a prisoner and was locked underground avoiding the pyroclastic flows.
4	La Soufrière	Saint Vincent and the Grenadines	1902	1,700	1,700 people were killed and a further 600 people were injured or burned. At least 4,000 people were left homeless.

=== 19th century ===
VEI	Volcano	Country	Year	Fatalities	Notes
4	Doña Juana	Colombia	1899		
4	Mount Mayon	Philippines	1897	350–400	
4	Calbuco	Chile	1893–1894		
4	Suwanosejima	Japan	1889		
4	Volcán de Colima	Mexico	1889		
4	Mount Bandai	Japan	1888	477+	1888 eruption of Mount Bandai
4	Niuafo'ou	Tonga	1886		
5	Mount Tarawera	New Zealand	1886	108+	Largest historical eruption in New Zealand
4	Tungurahua	Ecuador	1886	2	
4	Augustine	Alaska, United States	1883–1884		Augustine has had six significant eruptions: 1812, 1883–1884, 1935, 1963–1964, 1976, and 1986. Only the 1883 eruption produced a tsunami.
6	Krakatoa	Indonesia	1883	36,417	The 1883 eruption of Krakatoa was one of the loudest explosions ever recorded, and was heard at least 3,000 miles (4,800 km) away. Caused a 5-year volcanic winter. The island had three volcanoes. Perboewatan (410 ft) and Danan (1,480 ft) were destroyed during the eruption, and Rakata (2,667 ft) was half destroyed and the surviving half remains above sea level. In 1928, a new volcano called Anak Krakatoa (1,063 ft) grew above sea level, forming a new island by Rakata's island.
4	Volcán de Fuego	Guatemala	1880		
4	Cotopaxi	Ecuador	1877	340	
4	Suwanosejima	Japan	1877		
5	Askja	Iceland	1875		
4	Grímsvötn	Iceland	1873		
4	Mount Merapi	Indonesia	1872	200	
4	Sinarka	Russia	1872		
4	Makian	Indonesia	1861	309–326	
4	Katla	Iceland	1860		
4	Volcán de Fuego	Guatemala	1857		
4	Hokkaidō Koma-ga-take	Japan	1856	20	
5	Shiveluch	Russia	1854		
4	Mount Usu	Japan	1853		
4	Fonualei	Tonga	1846		
4	Hekla	Iceland	1845		
5	Mount Agung	Indonesia	1843		
5	Cosigüina	Nicaragua	1835		
5-6	Zavaritski Caldera	Kuril Islands	1831		
4	Klyuchevskaya Sopka	Russia	1829		
4	Avachinsky	Russia	1827		
4	Kelud	Indonesia	1826		
5	Galunggung	Indonesia	1822	4,011	Lahars killed more than 4,000 people.
4	Mount Usu	Japan	1822	50	
4	Volcán de Colima	Mexico	1818		
4	Mount Raung	Indonesia	1817		
7	Mount Tambora	Indonesia	1815	71,000–250,100+	Largest and deadliest volcanic eruption in recorded history. Caused the "Year Without a Summer" in 1816.
4	Mount Mayon	Philippines	1814	1,200	The town of Cagsawa was buried and approximately 1,200 people were killed.
4	Suwanosejima	Japan	1813		
4	Mount Awu	Indonesia	1812		
4	La Soufrière	Saint Vincent and the Grenadines	1812	56	
6	Unknown source	Unknown	1808		Greenland and Antarctic ice samples suggest an undocumented eruption roughly half the magnitude of Mount Tambora occurred, contributing to the 1810s being the coldest decade in at least 500 years. Recent searches of documents suggest that it may have taken place in South Western Pacific Ocean around 4 December 1808 and observed in Colombia from 11 December 1808. It is also known that the Chilean Putana volcano had a major eruption around this time with an approximate date of 1810 (with a 10-year margin of error), but is located 22 degrees south.
4	Tutupaca	Peru	1802		

=== 18th century ===
VEI	Volcano	Country	Year	Fatalities	Notes
5	Mount St. Helens	Washington, United States	1800		
4	Witori	Papua New Guinea	1800		
4	Mount Westdahl	Alaska, United States	1795		
4	San Martin Tuxtla	Mexico	1793		
4	Kilauea	Hawaii, United States	1790	400+	Keanakakoi eruption
4	Mount Etna	Italy	1787		
4	Laki	Iceland	1783–1784	10,000+	1783–1784 eruption of Laki
4	Mount Asama	Japan	1783	1,500–1,624	Tenmei eruption
4	Raikoke	Russia	1778	15	
4	Mount Usu	Japan	1769		
4	Cotopaxi	Ecuador	1768		
4	Hekla	Iceland	1766–1768		
4	Miyake-jima	Japan	1763		
4	Mount Pavlof	Alaska, United States	1762		
4	Makian	Indonesia	1760–1761		
4	El Jorullo	Mexico	1759–1774		
5	Katla	Iceland	1755		
5	Taal	Philippines	1754	50-60+	Erupted continuously for 200 days and buried the Town of Taal on the shore of the lake
4	Taal	Philippines	1749		
4	Cotopaxi	Ecuador	1744		
4	Oshima–Ōshima	Japan	1741–1742	1,467–2,033	1741 eruption of Oshima–Ōshima and the Kampo tsunami
5	Mount Tarumae	Japan	1739		
4	Volcán de Fuego	Guatemala	1737		
4	Öræfajökull	Iceland	1727–1728		
5	Katla	Iceland	1721		
4	Cerro Bravo	Colombia	1720		
4	Raoul Island	Kermadec Islands, New Zealand	1720		
4	Volcán de Fuego	Guatemala	1717		
4	Taal	Philippines	1716		
5	Mount Fuji	Japan	1707		Hōei eruption of Mount Fuji

=== 17th century ===
VEI	Volcano	Country	Year	Fatalities	Notes
4	Hekla	Iceland	1693		
5	Tangkoko	Indonesia	1680		
5	Mount Gamkonora	Indonesia	1673		
5	Mount Tarumae	Japan	1667		
5	Mount Usu	Japan	1663		
4	Katla	Iceland	1660–1661		
4	Guagua Pichincha	Ecuador	1660		
6	Long Island	Papua New Guinea	1660		
5	Shiveluch	Russia	1652		
4	Kolumbo	Santorini, Greece	1650	70	
4	Makian	Indonesia	1646		
4	Kelud	Indonesia	1641		
5	Mount Melibengoy	Philippines	1640–1641		
5	Hokkaido Komagatake	Japan	1640	700	A partial summit collapse caused a tsunami that killed 700 people.
4	Raung	Indonesia	1638		
5	Mount Vesuvius	Italy	1631	4,000+	1631 eruption of Mount Vesuvius
5	Furnas	Azores, Portugal	1630		
4	Raoul Island	Kermadec Islands, New Zealand	1630		
5	Katla	Iceland	1625		
4	Volcán de Colima	Mexico	1622		
4	Katla	Iceland	1612		
4	Volcán de Colima	Mexico	1606		

=== 16th century ===
VEI	Volcano	Country	Year	Fatalities	Notes
4	Suwanosejima	Japan	1600		
6	Huaynaputina	Peru	1600	1,500	1600 eruption of Huaynaputina, Russian famine of 1601–1603
4	Hekla	Iceland	1597		
4	Nevado del Ruiz	Colombia	1595	636	This eruption caused lahars, which traveled down the valleys of the nearby Gualí and Lagunillas rivers, clogging up the water, killing fish and destroying vegetation. More than 600 people died as a result of the lahar.
5	Raung	Indonesia	1593		
5	Kelud	Indonesia	1586	10,000+	
4	Volcán de Colima	Mexico	1585		
4	Volcán de Fuego	Guatemala	1581		
4	Katla	Iceland	1580		
6	Billy Mitchell	Papua New Guinea	1580		
5	Água de Pau	Azores, Portugal	1563		
4	Katla	Iceland	1550		
4	Cotopaxi	Ecuador	1534		
4	Cotopaxi	Ecuador	1532		
4	Hekla	Iceland	1510		
4	Katla	Iceland	1500		

== Smaller eruptions resulting in fatalities or significant damage ==
VEI	Volcano	Country	Year	Fatalities	Notes
3	Guagua Pichincha	Ecuador	2000	2	A phreatic eruption on 12 March killed two volcanologists working on the lava dome.
3	Soufrière Hills	Montserrat	1997	19	A major eruption on 25 June 1997 caused pyroclastic flows to move at 60–100 mph, which killed 19 people and destroyed towns.
2	Kanlaon	Philippines	1996	3	24 mountain climbers hiked the volcano when it erupted without warning on 10 August 1996, resulting in 3 fatalities.
1	Yakedake	Japan	1995	4	Four people at a highway construction site were killed by a hydrothermal explosion on 11 February 1995.
2	Mount Merapi	Indonesia	1994	64	A pyroclastic flow on 22 November 1994 killed 64 people.
3	Rinjani	Indonesia	1994	30	A cold lahar from the summit of Rinjani on 3 November 1994 travelled down the Kokok Jenggak River, killing 30 people.
2	Mayon	Philippines	1993	79	Pyroclastic flows killed 79 people.
2	Galeras	Colombia	1993	9	Galeras tragedy
2	Karangetang	Indonesia	1992	6	Six people were killed by a pyroclastic flow from an eruption on 18 May 1992.
1	Mount Unzen	Japan	1991	43	A destructive and fatal eruption on 3 June 1991 at 4:08 pm caused the first large-scale pyroclastic flow, unprecedented at the time, which killed 43 people in the evacuation zone. Among these were French volcanologists Katia and Maurice Krafft, as well as American geologist Harry Glicken. The other 40 fatalities consisted largely of those involved in the mass media, as well as firefighters, police officers, farmers and taxi drivers.
3	Mount Redoubt	Alaska, United States	1989–1990		Second costliest volcanic eruption in United States history. Caused engine failure of all four engines on KLM Flight 867 after it flew through the ash cloud.
3	Nevado del Ruiz	Colombia	1985	23,000	Armero tragedy
3	Mount Etna	Italy	1979	9	A sudden phreatic explosion killed 9 tourists
2	Mount Marapi	Indonesia	1979	80	A landslide on 30 April 1979 killed 80 people, damaged five villages and destroyed farmland.
1	Dieng Volcanic Complex	Indonesia	1979	149	149 people died of gas poisoning in Pekisaran Village on 20 February 1979.
1	Mount Nyiragongo	Democratic Republic of the Congo	1977	70	Lava flows killed 70 people and left 800 people homeless. About 1,200 hectares of agricultural land was destroyed.
3	Eldfell	Iceland	1973	1	
2	Villarrica	Chile	1971	15–30	
3	Mount Hudson	Chile	1971	5	Lahars killed 5 people and many more were evacuated.
2	Didicas	Philippines	1969	3	Triggered a Volcanic tsunami that killed 3 fishermen.
3	Volcán Arenal	Costa Rica	1968	87	On Monday, 29 July 1968, at 7:30 am, the Arenal Volcano suddenly and violently erupted. The eruptions continued unabated for several days, burying over 15 square kilometers (5.8 sq mi) under rocks, lava and ash. The eruptions killed 87 people and buried 3 small villages – Tabacón, Pueblo Nuevo and San Luís – and affected more than 232 square kilometers (90 sq mi) of land. Crops were spoiled, property was ruined, and large numbers of livestock were killed.
1	Dieng Volcanic Complex	Indonesia	1964	114	
2	Villarrica	Chile	1964	25	
3	Surtsey	Iceland	1963–1967		
2	Bayonnaise Rocks	Japan	1952	31	An eruption on 18 September 1952 killed 31 researchers and crewmen aboard the Maritime Safety Agency survey ship No.5 Kaiyo-Maru.
3	Hibok-Hibok	Philippines	1951	500-2,000+	This eruption was a turning point for the Philippine government to establish a dedicated agency to focus on volcanoes and its activities. It led to the creation of COMVOL (Commission on Volcanology) which would later be PHILVOLCS.
3	Villarrica	Chile	1948	23	Mudflows buried 1000 hectares of arable land and forest and destroyed numerous buildings. 23 people were killed and 31 others were missing.
2	Dieng Volcanic Complex	Indonesia	1944	117	
3	Mount Vesuvius	Italy	1944	20	Most recent eruption of Mount Vesuvius. Eruption took place during liberation of Italy by American and British soldiers. Destroyed original village of San Sebastiano al Vesuvo. Extreme damage to the city of Naples in form of ash and building collapses.
1	Dieng Volcanic Complex	Indonesia	1939	10	
3	Mount Merapi	Indonesia	1930–1931	1,369	
2	Stromboli	Italy	1930	4	
3	Paluweh	Indonesia	1928	160+	A volcanic landslide triggered a tsunami 5–10 m high, killing more than 160 people.
2	Dieng Volcanic Complex	Indonesia	1928	40	
1	Mount Etna	Italy	1928		Effusive eruption resulting in the complete destruction of the municipality of Mascali.
3	Lassen Peak	California, United States	1915		First volcano in the Cascades Volcanic Arc heading northwards, possibly the first volcanic eruption recorded using motion picture camera. Pyroclastic flows caused massive fires and evidence of the eruption still present in form of unusual growth patterns of trees as of 2020, 105 years later and charred trees. Area now forbidden to settle in as it is now Lassen Volcanic National Park.
3	Taal	Philippines	1911	1,335	Base surge and tsunami inside the Taal lake caldera killed thousands of people living near the Taal Volcano island. The ash reached as far as Manila.
3	Tori-shima	Japan	1902	150	
3	Mount Awu	Indonesia	1892	1,532	
2	Ritter Island	Papua New Guinea	1888	500–3000	1888 Ritter Island eruption and tsunami
2	Ruang	Indonesia	1871	416	1871 Ruang eruption and tsunami
3	Dubbi	Eritrea	1861	106	
3	Mount Awu	Indonesia	1856	2,806	
3	Nevado del Ruiz	Colombia	1845	1,000	
2	Mount Etna	Italy	1843	56	
2	Mount Unzen	Japan	1792	15,000	1792 Unzen earthquake and tsunami
2	Dieng Volcanic Complex	Indonesia	1786	38	Ground fissuring destroyed the village of Jamping, killing 38 people.
3	Gamalama	Indonesia	1775	1,300	
3	Mount Papandayan	Indonesia	1772	3,000	An eruption in 1772 caused the northeast flank to collapse producing a catastrophic debris avalanche that destroyed 40 villages and killed nearly 3,000 people.
?	Tseax Cone	Canada	1700	2,000	
3	Mount Etna	Italy	1669		1669 eruption of Mount Etna
3	Monte Nuovo (Phlegraean Fields)	Italy	1538	24	

== See also ==
- List of volcanic eruptions in the 21st century
- List of natural disasters by death toll
- List of volcanic eruptions by death toll
- Lists of volcanoes
