= List of volcanic eruptions by death toll =

Volcanic eruptions can be highly explosive. Some volcanoes have undergone catastrophic eruptions, killing large numbers of humans or other life forms. This list documents volcanic eruptions by human death toll.

== Volcanic eruptions ==
Human death toll	Volcano	VEI	Location	Year	Eruption	Source(s)
71,000 to 1,000,000+	Mount Tambora	7	Indonesia	1815	1815 eruption of Mount Tambora, Year Without a Summer	
36,000+	Krakatoa	6	Indonesia	1883	1883 eruption of Krakatoa	
30,000	Mount Pelée	4	Martinique	1902	1902 eruption of Mount Pelée	
23,000	Nevado del Ruiz	3	Colombia	1985	Armero tragedy	
20,000~ (estimated)	Santorini	7	Greece	c. 1600 BC	Minoan eruption	
15,000 to 20,000	Mount Rinjani	7	Indonesia	1257	1257 Samalas eruption	
15,000	Mount Unzen	2	Japan	1792	1792 Unzen earthquake and tsunami	
13,000+ (estimated)	Mount Vesuvius	5	Italy	79	Eruption of Mount Vesuvius in 79 AD	
10,000+	Laki and Grímsvötn	4	Iceland	1783	Laki 1783 eruption	
10,000	Kelud	5	Indonesia	1586		
6,000	Santa María	6	Guatemala	1902	1902 eruption of Santa María	
5,160	Kelud	4	Indonesia	1919		
4,011	Galunggung	5	Indonesia	1822		
3,360	Mount Vesuvius	5	Italy	1631	1631 eruption of Mount Vesuvius	
3,000	Ritter Island	2	Papua New Guinea	1888	1888 Ritter Island eruption and tsunami	
2,957	Mount Papandayan	3	Indonesia	1772		
2,942	Mount Lamington	4	Papua New Guinea	1951	1951 eruption of Mount Lamington	
2,806	Mount Awu	3	Indonesia	1856		
2,033	Oshima Oshima	4	Japan	1741	1741 eruption of Oshima–Ōshima and the Kampo tsunami	
2,000	Tseax Cone	?	Canada	c. 1700		
1,900	El Chichón	5	Mexico	1982		
1,700	Soufrière	4	St. Vincent	1902		
1,584	Mount Agung	5	Indonesia	1963		
1,532	Mount Awu	3	Indonesia	1892		
1,500	Huaynaputina	6	Peru	1600		
1,369	Mount Merapi	3	Indonesia	1930		
1,335	Taal	3	Philippines	1911		
1,300	Gamalama	3	Indonesia	1775		
1,200	Mount Mayon	4	Philippines	1814		
1,151	Mount Asama	4	Japan	1783	Tenmei eruption	
1,000	Nevado del Ruiz	3	Colombia	1845		
847	Mount Pinatubo	6	Philippines	1991	1991 eruption of Mount Pinatubo	
700	Hokkaido Komagatake	5	Japan	1640		
600	Nevado del Ruiz	4	Colombia	1595		
507	Tavurvur	4	Papua New Guinea	1937		
500	Hibok-Hibok	3	Philippines	1951		
477	Mount Bandai	4	Japan	1888	1888 eruption of Mount Bandai	
426	Anak Krakatoa	3	Indonesia	2018	2018 Sunda Strait tsunami	
416	Ruang	2	Indonesia	1871	1871 Ruang eruption and tsunami	
400+	Kilauea	4	Hawaii, United States	1790	Keanakakoi eruption	
350 to 400	Mount Mayon	4	Philippines	1897		
353	Mount Merapi	4	Indonesia	2010	2010 eruptions of Mount Merapi	
340	Cotopaxi	4	Ecuador	1877		
326	Makian	4	Indonesia	1861		
245	Nyiragongo	1	Democratic Republic of the Congo	2002		
216	Mount Vesuvius	4	Italy	1906		
190 to 2,900	Volcán de Fuego	3	Guatemala	2018	2018 Volcán de Fuego eruption	
160+	Paluweh	3	Indonesia	1928		
150	Tori-shima	3	Japan	1902		
149	Dieng Volcanic Complex	1	Indonesia	1979	1979 eruption of Sinila crater	
140	Mount Tokachi	3	Japan	1926		
117	Dieng Volcanic Complex	2	Indonesia	1944		
114	Dieng Volcanic Complex	1	Indonesia	1964		
108 to 120	Mount Tarawera	5	New Zealand	1886	1886 eruption of Mount Tarawera	
106	Dubbi	3	Eritrea	1861		
100 to 1000	Cotopaxi	4	Ecuador	1768		
100 to 1000	Cotopaxi	3	Ecuador	1742		
87	Volcán Arenal	3	Costa Rica	1968		
80	Mount Marapi	2	Indonesia	1979	1979 eruption of Mount Marapi	
79	Mount Mayon	2	Philippines	1993		
70	Nyiragongo	1	Democratic Republic of the Congo	1977		
70~	Kolumbo	4	Greece	1650		
69	Semeru	4	Indonesia	2021	2021 Semeru eruption	
64	Mount Merapi	2	Indonesia	1994		
63	Mount Ontake	3	Japan	2014	2014 Mount Ontake eruption	
58	Sakurajima	4	Japan	1914		
57	Mount St. Helens	5	United States	1980	1980 eruption of Mount St. Helens	
56	Mount Etna	2	Italy	1843		
56	La Soufrière	4	Saint Vincent and the Grenadines	1812		
50	Mount Usu	4	Japan	1822		
43	Mount Unzen	1	Japan	1991		
40	Dieng Volcanic Complex	2	Indonesia	1928		
39	Taal	4	Philippines	2020	2020–2022 Taal Volcano eruptions	
38	Dieng Volcanic Complex	2	Indonesia	1786		
32	Mount Nyiragongo	1	Democratic Republic of the Congo	2021	2021 Mount Nyiragongo eruption	
32	Kelud	4	Indonesia	1990		
31	Bayonnaise Rocks	2	Japan	1952		
31	Nabro Volcano	4	Eritrea	2011	2011 Nabro eruption	
30	Rinjani	3	Indonesia	1994		
27	Mount Vesuvius	3	Italy	1944		
25	Villarrica	2	Chile	1964		
24	Monte Nuovo (Phlegraean Fields)	3	Italy	1538		
23	Villarrica	3	Chile	1948		
23	Mount Marapi	2	Indonesia	2023	2023 eruption of Mount Marapi	
22	Whakaari/White Island	2	New Zealand	2019	2019 Whakaari / White Island eruption	
19	Soufrière Hills	3	Montserrat	1997		
18	Galunggung	4	Indonesia	1982		
16	Sinabung	4	Indonesia	2014		
15 to 30	Villarrica	2	Chile	1971		
15	Raikoke	4	Russia	1778		
10	Dieng Volcanic Complex	1	Indonesia	1939		
10	Lewotobi	3	Indonesia	2024		
10	Whakaari/White Island	?	New Zealand	1914		
9	Galeras	2	Colombia	1993	Galeras tragedy	
9	Mount Etna	3	Italy	1979		
8	Dieng Volcanic Complex	1	Indonesia	2017		
8	Kuchinoerabu-jima	4	Japan	1933		
7	Kelud	4	Indonesia	2014		
7	Jabal al-Tair	3	Yemen	2007		
6	Hunga Tonga–Hunga Haʻapai	5	Tonga	2022	2021–22 Hunga Tonga–Hunga Haʻapai eruption and tsunami	
6	Karangetang	2	Indonesia	1992		
5	Mount Tavurvur	4	Papua New Guinea	1994		
5	Mount Hudson	3	Chile	1971		
4	Gamalama	2	Indonesia	2011		
4	Yakedake	1	Japan	1995		
4	Stromboli	2	Italy	1930		
3	Pacaya	3	Guatemala	2010		
3	Kanlaon	2	Philippines	1996		
3	Didicas	2	Philippines	1969		
3	Dukono	?	Indonesia	2026	May 2026 eruption of Dukono	
2	Santa Ana	3	El Salvador	2005		
2	Mount Bromo	2	Indonesia	2004		
1	Popocatépetl	2	Mexico	2022		
1	Cumbre Vieja	3	Spain	2021	2021 Cumbre Vieja volcanic eruption	
1	Stromboli	2	Italy	2019		
1	Chaitén	4	Chile	2008		
1	Raoul Island	1	New Zealand	2006		
1	Eldfell	3	Iceland	1973		

== See also ==
- Lists of disasters
- List of volcanic eruption deaths
- List of natural disasters by death toll
- List of volcanic eruptions in the 21st century
