= Sector collapse =

Collapse of a volcano

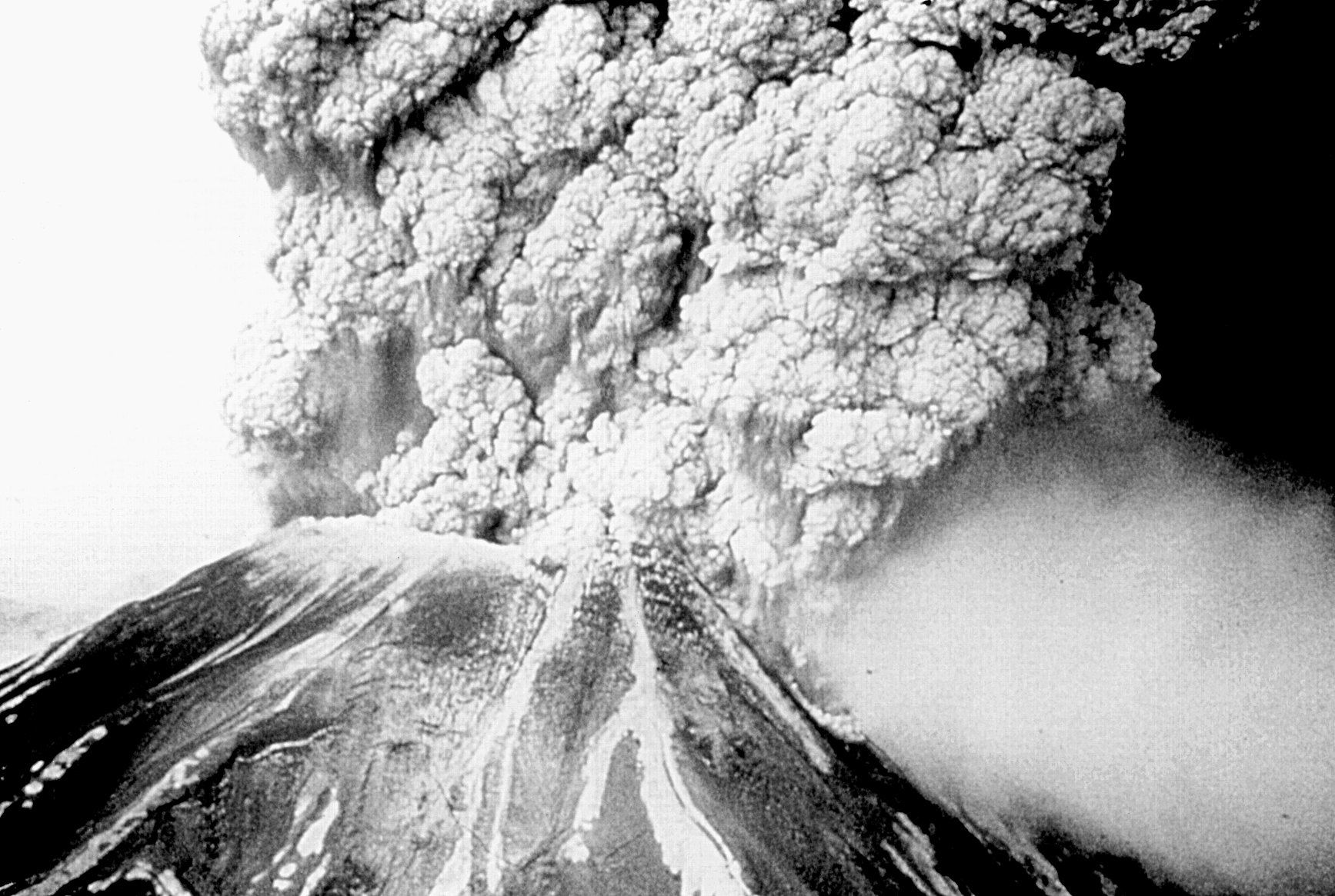
Sector collapse during the 1980 eruption of Mount St. Helens

A sector collapse or lateral collapse is the structural failure and subsequent collapse of a minimum volume of 1 km^{3} (0.24 cu mi) of a volcano. Unlike smaller flank collapses, a sector collapse can involve the central volcanic pipe and historically this term had been restricted by some writers to such events in arc stratovolcanoes, but is now used for large events in any volcano. Sector collapses are one of the most hazardous volcanic events, often resulting in lateral blasts, landslides, and changes in volcanic eruptive behavior. Sector collapse can be caused by earthquakes, volcanic eruptions, gradual volcanic deformation, and other processes. Sector collapse events can occur on volcanoes at convergent and divergent plate boundaries. Sector collapses are generally very sudden; however, some attempts have been made to predict collapse events.

== Causes ==
=== Internal ===
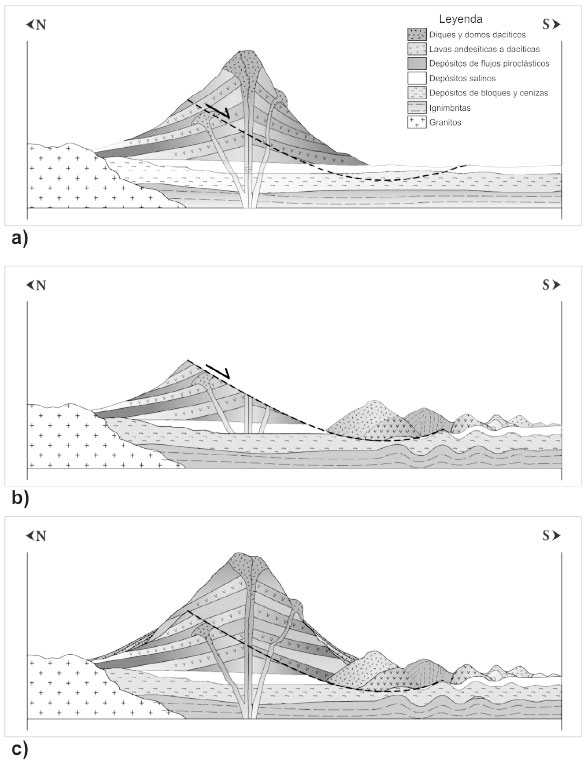
Example of sector collapse: cross-section diagram of Tata Sabaya volcano (in Bolivia) (a) pre-collapse volcano, (b) after collapse, (c) new edifice built on top of collapsed old edifice

Sector collapse can result from internal volcanic processes. Volcanic eruption can damage originally stable magma chambers, causing a portion of the volcano to collapse. While eruption is one cause, sector collapse can occur without any eruption. Magmatic intrusions can also lead to sector collapse. Dikes fracture and deform rock, leaving the volcano weaker and more susceptible to collapse. Hydrothermal activity is another internal cause, likely due to reactions of acid-sulfates weakening volcanic rock. Gravity-induced collapse occurs when the volcanic slope approaches the critical angle of repose. The slope angle is a major factor in collapse events.

=== External ===
Sector collapse sometimes occurs because of external processes. Seismic activity is a prominent cause of collapse events. Earthquakes can weaken the structural stability of volcanoes, leading to sudden collapse or contributing to a later collapse. Intense weather and heavy rainfall can cause damaging erosion, increasing likelihood of collapse. Glacial melting is another external cause of sector collapse, with the majority of glacial melt induced collapses occurring during the Pleistocene. Glacial melting increases volcanic slope and decreases pore pressure, leading to sector collapse. Sea level change has also been associated with sector collapse.

=== Predicting sector collapse ===
Because sector collapse events occur suddenly and over small time periods, they are difficult to predict. More often, volcanoes are assessed for risk of sector collapse. Collapse ultimately occurs due to structural instability, which can be determined by volcanic slope angle, composition of the volcano, deformation, and other factors.

== Consequences ==
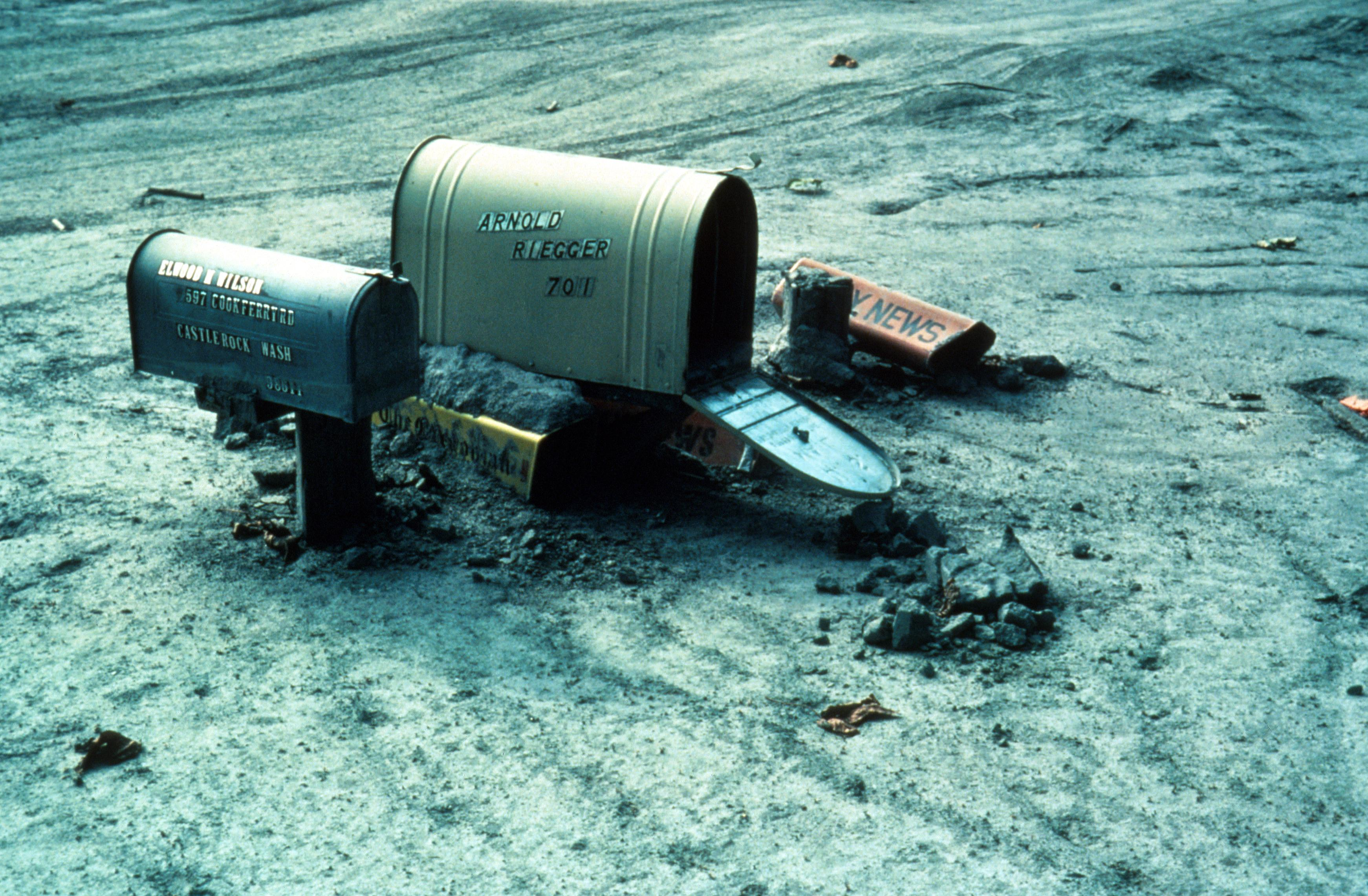
Mudflow-induced property damage caused by the 1980 Mount St. Helens sector collapse

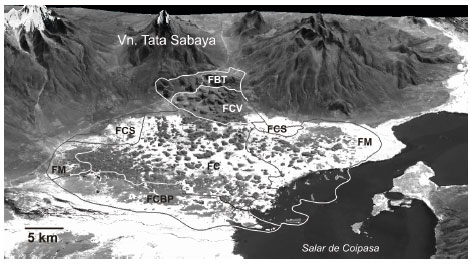
Debris avalanche deposit of Tata Sabaya volcano's sector collapse

=== Changes to volcanic systems ===
Some volcanoes experience no changes in volcanic behavior while others experience altered rates of eruption and magma composition. Collapse is typically followed by phreatic eruption due to a reduction in magma chamber pressure after sector collapse. Damage caused by collapse can create a new and different volcanic plumbing system, which could impact eruption rates. Sector collapse often results in eruption of more mafic magma. Large overlying surface mass and the denser nature of mafic magma often prevents its rise. Collapse relieves some of the overlying surface mass thus allowing for more mafic magma composition.

=== Human impacts ===
Sector collapses and landslides caused by them have directly resulted in more than 3,500 fatalities since 1600 and caused extensive property damage. A particularly deadly consequence of sector collapse is a tsunami. The Oshima-Oshima collapse led to a tsunami that killed 1,500 people. Sector collapse events can also displace thousands and cause homelessness.

=== Identifying sector collapse ===
Prehistoric sector collapses are stored in the geological record in the form of debris avalanche deposits and collapse scars. Debris avalanche deposits are found typically up to 20 km (12 mi) from the site of collapse, but in the case of the Hawaiian islands 200 km (120 mi) away. Studying avalanche deposits informs on the time scale of the collapse and the volcano from which it originated. Collapse scars are also an indicator of sector collapse and are often described as "amphitheatre" or "horseshoe" shaped. One such collapse scar is the Sciara del Fuoco formed on the Stromboli volcano due to a sector collapse.

== Examples ==
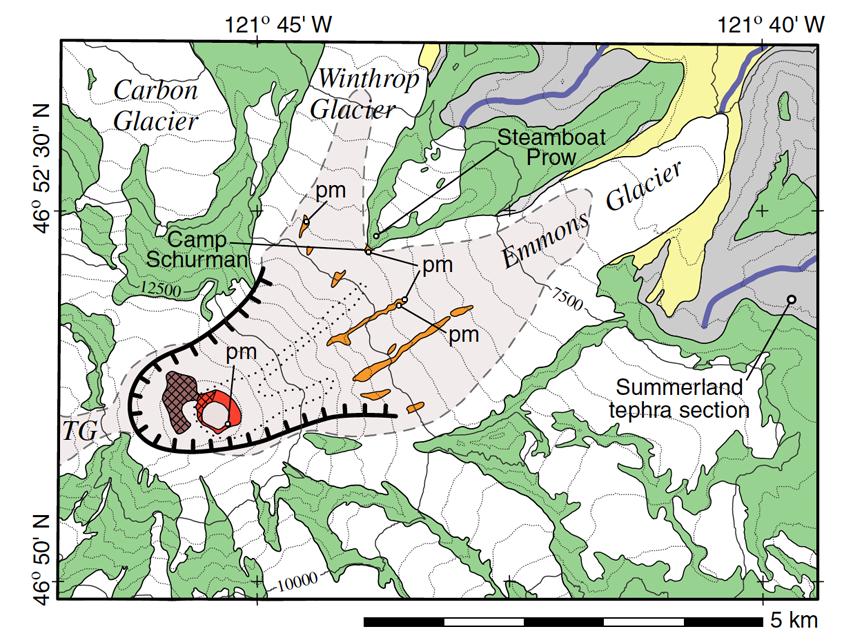
Approximation of Mount Rainer's Osceola collapse

=== Prehistoric ===
- Antuco
- Chimborazo
- Popocatépetl
- Mount Rainier
- Mount Shasta
- Shiveluch
- Stromboli

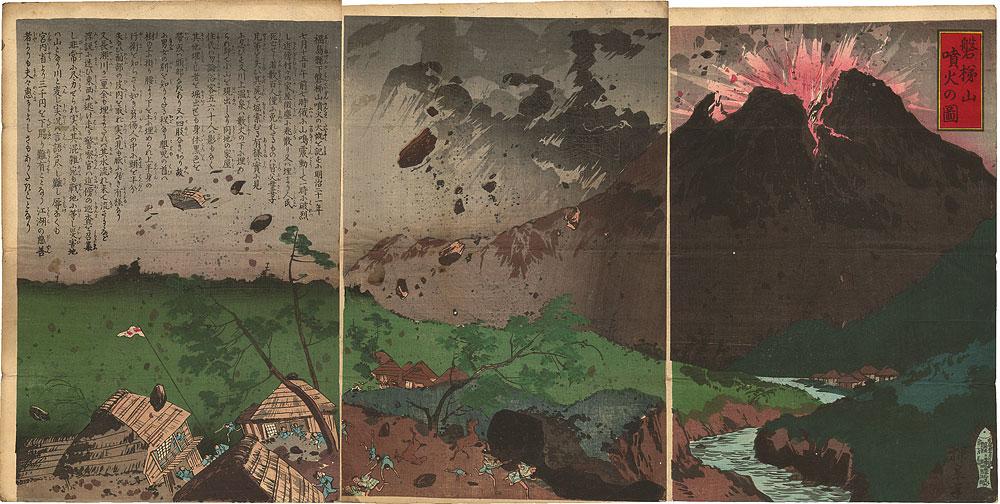
Ukiyo-e depiction of 1888 Bandai Sector collapse by Japanese artist Inoue Tankei

=== Historic ===
- Anak Krakatoa, 2018
- Mount Bandai, 1888
- Bezymianny, 1956
- Oshima-Oshima, 1741
- Ritter Island, 1888: largest historical collapse
- Mount St. Helens, 1980

== See also ==
- Volcanology
- Debris flow
