= 1871 Ruang eruption and tsunami =

Volcanic eruption and tsunami in Indonesia

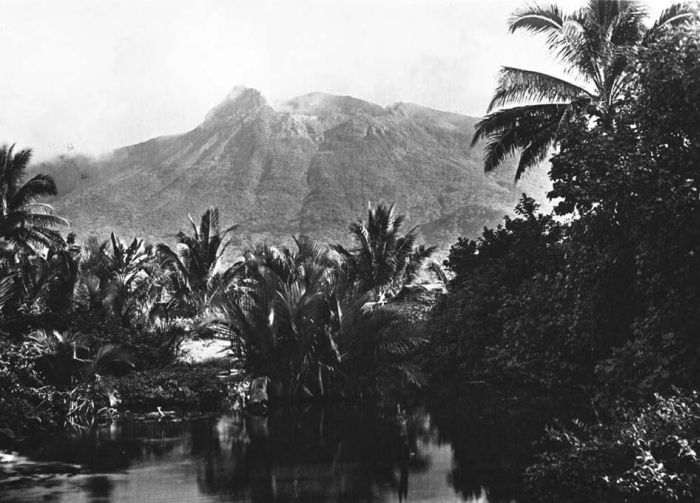
- Volcano: Mount Ruang
- Start date: 3 March 1871
- End date: 14 March 1871
- Location: Sangihe Islands, Molucca Sea
- VEI: 2
- Deaths: 416

The 1871 Ruang eruption began on 3 March, and ended on 14 March 1871 at the Ruang volcano in the Molucca Sea, Indonesia. The eruption triggered a locally devastating tsunami measuring 25 m (82 ft). It flooded many villages on nearby islands, killing some 400 people.

== Eruption ==
The eruption on 3 March began when volcanic materials began falling from the summit and into the sea. German zoologist and anthropologist Dr. Adolf Bernhard Meyer, an eyewitness to the eruption described Ruang as a conical island rising above the sea. At the time of the eruption, the island was uninhabited. The residents of nearby Tagulandang island however, owned plantations on Ruang island. A strong earthquake and loud rumbling sound occurred at 20:00 local time. Based on examining historical observations of the eruption, Pranantyo and others interpreted it as the partial collapse of the eastern volcanic flank. Simulation of a flank collapse and the triggered tsunami indicate the volume of the slide at 0.1 km^{3} (0.024 cu mi) best fit the historical descriptions of the tsunami heights on nearby islands. The Global Volcanism Program at the Smithsonian Institution assigned the eruption Level 2 on the volcanic explosivity index (VEI). Eruptions continued on 9–10 and 14 March.

== Tsunami ==
According to Dr. Meyer, the tsunami caused extreme devastation on Tagulandang island, located next to Ruang, very few homes survived the tsunami. Waves of up to 25 m (82 ft) swept into the seaside settlements, and inundated 180 m (590 ft) inland. Two additional tsunami waves struck the coast shortly after. The tsunami destroyed the village of Bahhuas; at least 75 homes were destroyed. Three homes remained at the coast but only one was safe for use; the two other homes suffered major damage. Many homes were overturned or obliterated. A church on the island with thick exterior walls was also demolished. Debris of homes were deposited all over the former settlement.

== See also ==
- 1741 eruption of Oshima–Ōshima and the Kampo tsunami
- 1888 Ritter Island eruption and tsunami
- 2018 Sunda Strait tsunami
- 2022 Hunga Tonga–Hunga Haʻapai eruption and tsunami
- List of tsunamis
- List of volcanic eruptions by death toll
