= 1979 eruption of Sinila crater =

Volcanic eruption in Indonesia

- Volcano: Dieng Volcanic Complex,
- Date: 20 February 1979
- Location: Central Java, Indonesia
- VEI: 1
- Impact: 175 –180 deaths (up to 800+ deaths have been reported); 1,000+ injured 17,000 evacuated

During the night of 20 February 1979, the Sinila volcano of the Dieng Volcanic Complex erupted on the Indonesian island of Java in Central Java province. Over 175 people died, mainly due to gas poisoning in villages on the plateau near the Sinila crater. It was the fourth Sinila eruption since 1928, and the first one since 1951.This complex sits on a subduction zone between the Australian and Eurasian plates.

== Geological impact and toxic gas emission ==
The eruption started in the early morning, with three earthquakes before the initial explosion at 5 in the morning at Sinila crater. The eruption involved explosions, the expulsion of rocks and mud, intense steam and gas release, and a hot lahar that flowed over roads and farmland along a 3.5 km stretch. A new crater was created, measuring approximately 90 m in diameter and 100 m deep. A new vent, 15 meters in width, formed after a second but minor eruption at 6:45 am, in the Sigludug area. Mud and stones were expelled and a small lahar was released. During the eruption, the Sumur crater, another crater in the Dieng complex, which was initially dormant, got reactivated and started showing activity when carbon dioxide emissions began to occur.

During the eruption, toxic gases were emitted from the Sinila crater for two days. Carbon dioxide emissions continued for several months after the initial explosion. Voluminous amounts of carbon dioxide started to emerge from both the fracture and the Sigluduk crater, and sheets of the dense gas flowed down to the Batur plain. Gases were still released for several months after the explosion. These gases were sampled in early July, when they were emitted. The gas was made up of carbon dioxide, methane, and hydrogen sulfide. These craters are known for emitting toxic gases, which are dangerous for the people living nearby.

The eruption came unexpectedly as the Sinila volcano had been considered dormant for a long time. The eruption followed after seven earthquakes and an explosion. Two explosions occurred within an hour of each other, causing a lahar lava flow. Next to lava, toxic gas was released which could be seen, smelled or tasted. As the eruption took place during the night, people inhaled the poisonous gases during their sleep and died. The village with the most deaths was Pucukan in Sidoarjo, where bodies were also lying on the streets. The rescue work was made difficult due to toxic gases and difficulty accessing the area. At some places the streets were covered by an 8-metre (26 ft) layer of lava. The worst affected village was Pekasiran, which was inaccessible due to the mud and lava.

== Casualties, losses, and human response ==
Rescue work was also hampered due to a lack of gas masks. Policemen, soldiers and volunteers were killed by the gases due to the absence of enough gas masks.

A few days after the eruption, the death toll rose to 180. Some sources even stated over 800 deaths. According to an expert, most people died due to panic after the eruption. It was later discovered that 142 people among the casualties died due to the toxic gas when they were fleeing along a trail from the village of Kepucukan towards the Batur village.

People went to higher ground to flee the lava but were killed by the toxic gas. Over 1,000 people were injured, and many people were hospitalized.

The toxic gas not only killed people. There was a 4-meter-wide, 40 centimeters thick gas sheet seen discharging from the Sigludug vent. The vegetation around which had already suffered damage from the eruption also showed signs of chemical destruction where the gas flowed. The chemical destruction of the gas sheet in a small valley resulted in dead birds and rodents lying on the valley bottom.

The Indonesian government ordered that an area of 3 kilometres (1.9 mi) around the mountain be evacuated, affecting around 17,000 people. President Suharto stated that around 6,000 people have evacuated by February 22nd. Evacuation efforts were hampered due to lava severing main roads, restricting access to the area.

The Sinila crater and the whole Dieng Volcanic complex is being watched and monitored. Reports in 2023 indicated that the carbon dioxide emissions have decreased and the alert level for the Dieng Volcanic Complex has been lowered to 1 (on a scale of 1-4). Though the public was still warned to stay at least 500 meters away from several craters in the volcanic complex, including the Sileri Crater and the Timbang Crater. It is also told to take caution when digging the ground around the area which may result in gasses being released from the soil.

== See also ==
- List of volcanic eruptions by death toll
- 1979 eruption of Mount Marapi, another notable eruption in Indonesia in the same year
