= List of volcanic eruption deaths =

This is a list of notable people who died as a result of injuries sustained during a volcanic eruption.

Name	Age	Volcano	Location	Date
Pliny the Elder	56	Mount Vesuvius	Italy	24 August CE 79
Drusilla	~41	Mount Vesuvius	Italy	24 August CE 79
Caesius Bassus	Unknown	Mount Vesuvius	Italy	24 August CE 79
Aulus Umbricius Scaurus	Unknown	Mount Vesuvius	Italy	24 August CE 79
Pomponianus	Unknown	Mount Vesuvius	Italy	24 August CE 79
Carl Hunstein	45	Ritter Island	Papua New Guinea	13 March 1888
Louis Mouttet	44	Mount Pelée	Martinique	8 May 1902
Marius Hurard	53	Mount Pelée	Martinique	8 May 1902
Dickie Humphries	60	Mount Lamington	Papua New Guinea	21 January 1951
David A. Johnston	30	Mount St. Helens	United States	18 May 1980
Reid Blackburn	28	Mount St. Helens	United States	18 May 1980
Robert Landsburg	48	Mount St. Helens	United States	18 May 1980
Harry R. Truman	83	Mount St. Helens	United States	18 May 1980
Omayra Sánchez	13	Nevado del Ruiz	Colombia	16 November 1985
Katia Krafft	49	Mount Unzen	Japan	3 June 1991
Maurice Krafft	45	Mount Unzen	Japan	3 June 1991
Harry Glicken	33	Mount Unzen	Japan	3 June 1991
Mbah Maridjan	83	Mount Merapi	Indonesia	26 October 2010

== See also ==
- List of volcanic eruptions by death toll
- Lists of people by cause of death
- Volcano
