= Kelud =

Stratovolcano in East Java, Indonesia

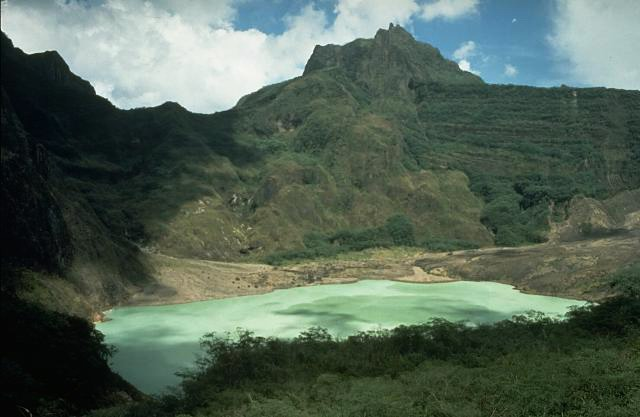

Highest point
- Elevation: 1,731 m (5,679 ft)
- Listing: List of volcanoes in Indonesia
- Coordinates: 7°55′48″S 112°18′29″E

Geography
- Location within Java
- Location: Kediri, East Java, Indonesia

Geology
- Mountain type: Stratovolcano
- Volcanic arc: Sunda Arc
- Last eruption: 13 February 2014

The Kelud (Javanese: ꦏꦼꦭꦸꦢ꧀, romanized: Kelud, sometimes spelled as Klut, Cloot, Kloet, Kloete, Keloed or Kelut) is a mountain stratovolcano located in Kediri, East Java, Indonesia. Like many Indonesian volcanoes and others on the Pacific Ring of Fire, Kelud is known for large explosive eruptions throughout its history. More than 30 eruptions have occurred since 1000 AD. In 2007, an effusive explosion filled the crater with a lava dome. It last erupted on 13 February 2014, destroying the lava dome and ejecting boulders, stones and ashes up to West Java about 500 kilometres (310 mi) from Mount Kelud. The crater filled with water during the rainy season.

== 1334 eruption ==
The eruption history of Kelud is unique in Indonesian history, because it was one of the few volcanoes whose activities were recorded in Indonesian historical accounts. According to Nagarakretagama canto 1 stanza 4 and 5 (composed by Mpu Prapanca in 1365), King Hayam Wuruk of Majapahit was born in 1256 Saka, which corresponds to 1334 CE, the same year that Mount Kelud erupted. Prapanca argued that this was the divine sign that Batara Gurunata has manifest Himself on earth, reincarnated as the Javanese king. This account also describes the local Javanese psyche at that time (and even up to present) that regarded the natural event such as volcanic eruption, as the divine sign from the gods.

== 1586 eruption ==
In that year, the worst eruption of Mount Kelud killed over 10,000 people.

== 1919 mudflow ==
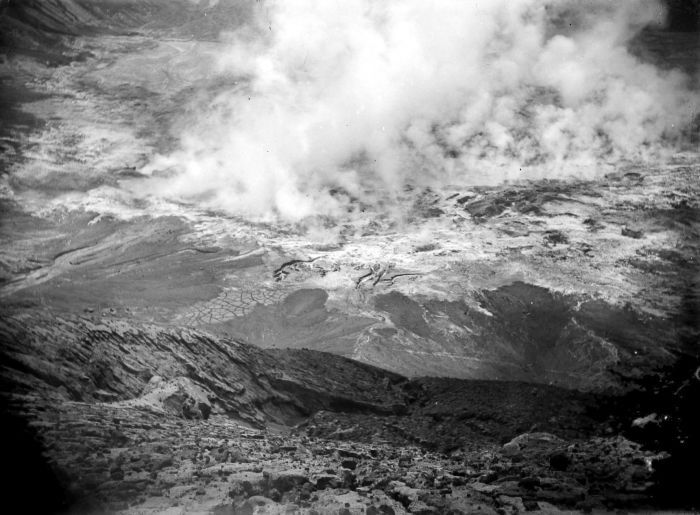
The crater in 1919

On May 19, 1919, an eruption at Kelud killed an estimated 5,000 people, mostly through hot mudflows (also known as "lahars"). A total of 26 villages and 40,000 acres of rice land were destroyed. The Dutch East Indies government sent 20,000 soldiers to restore the area. The Consul General for the Netherlands in Singapore also appealed for donations.

== 1966 eruption ==
Following the 1966 eruption, the Ampera Tunnels were built (top and bottom) on the southwestern side of the crater to reduce (not drain completely) the water of the crater lake and thus reduce the lahar hazard.

== 1990 eruption ==
A strong and explosive eruption on early February 1990 produced a seven-kilometer-high column of tephra, heavy tephra falls and several pyroclastic flows. More than thirty people were killed. Workers continued to construct the Ampera Tunnel despite the still-hot (90–400 °C or 200–800 °F) pyroclastic flow deposits which reached as high as 25 metres (80 ft) and buried the tunnel's mouth. This eruption killed over 300 monkeys in the surrounding forest.

More recent eruptions in 1951, 1966, and 1990 have altogether killed another 250 people.

== 2007 eruption ==
On 16 October, Indonesian authorities ordered the evacuation of 30,000 residents living near Kelud, after scientists placed the volcano on the highest alert level, meaning that they expected an imminent eruption.

Kelud erupted at about 3 p.m. local time on 3 November. The eruption was confirmed by the Indonesian government's Centre for Vulcanology and Geological Hazard Mitigation. Although no visual confirmation was possible when the eruption began because the volcano's peak was shrouded by clouds, Indonesian government volcanologists said seismic readings showed an eruption was under way. More than 350,000 people lived within 10 kilometres (6.2 mi) of the volcano. Surabaya, Indonesia's third-largest urban area and home to one of the country's busiest airports, is 90 kilometres (56 mi) to the northwest. Although residents were ordered to leave their homes in mid-October, many either did not evacuate or returned in the interim. Many villagers were reported fleeing the area in panic after reports of the eruption. But by early evening, Indonesian officials said the eruption that day had not been very large at all. Seismological equipment near the volcano's crater was still operating, and scientists said that indicated a small eruption at best.

However, on the early morning of 4 November, Mount Kelud spewed ash 500 metres (1,600 ft) into the air, indicating a full eruption was taking place. "The eruption isn't over," Saut Simatupang, head of Indonesian Volcanology and Geological Hazard Mitigation Agency, said. Seismologists monitoring the crater said surface temperatures in Mount Kelud's crater lake rose on 4 November to 60.7 °C (141.3 °F) from 43.9 °C (111.0 °F) on 3 November. At a depth of 15 metres (49 ft), the temperature jumped to 66.1 °C (151.0 °F) on 4 November from 45.9 °C (114.6 °F) on 3 November. The extreme heat created a cloud of steam and smoke 488 metres (1,601 ft) high.

On 5 November, new columns of smoke and steam erupted from the crater. Boiling water cascaded down the flanks of the mountain from the crater lake, and seismological equipment near the crater ceased working. Indonesian authorities said about 25,000 people remained in the danger zone, ignoring evacuation orders.

The following day, a lava dome rose through the centre of the crater lake atop the mountain. Closed-circuit television cameras showed the 100-metre (330 ft) long oblong island had pushed about 20 metres (66 ft) above the surface of the lake. The volcano continued to emit smoke, with plumes reaching 3,280 feet (1,000 m) into the atmosphere.

But after 48 hours of smoke and ash but no lava, Indonesian officials declared on 8 November that no eruption was immediate. Officials said the volcano was experiencing a "slow eruption" and was unlikely to explode as it had done many times in the past century.

By 12 November, Mount Kelud began spewing lava into its crater lake. The lava dome, which had expanded to 250 metres (820 ft) long and 120 metres (390 ft) high, cracked open and lava began oozing into the surrounding water. Smoke rose more than two kilometres (1.2 mi; 6,600 ft) into the air, and ash dusted several villages around the volcano. On 14 November, smoke billowed 2.5 kilometres (1.6 mi) into the air, and light ash covered villages 15 kilometres (9.3 mi) away. The hot lava dome occupied the lake crater and, consequently, the lake disappeared.

== 2014 eruption ==
2014 eruption of Kelud
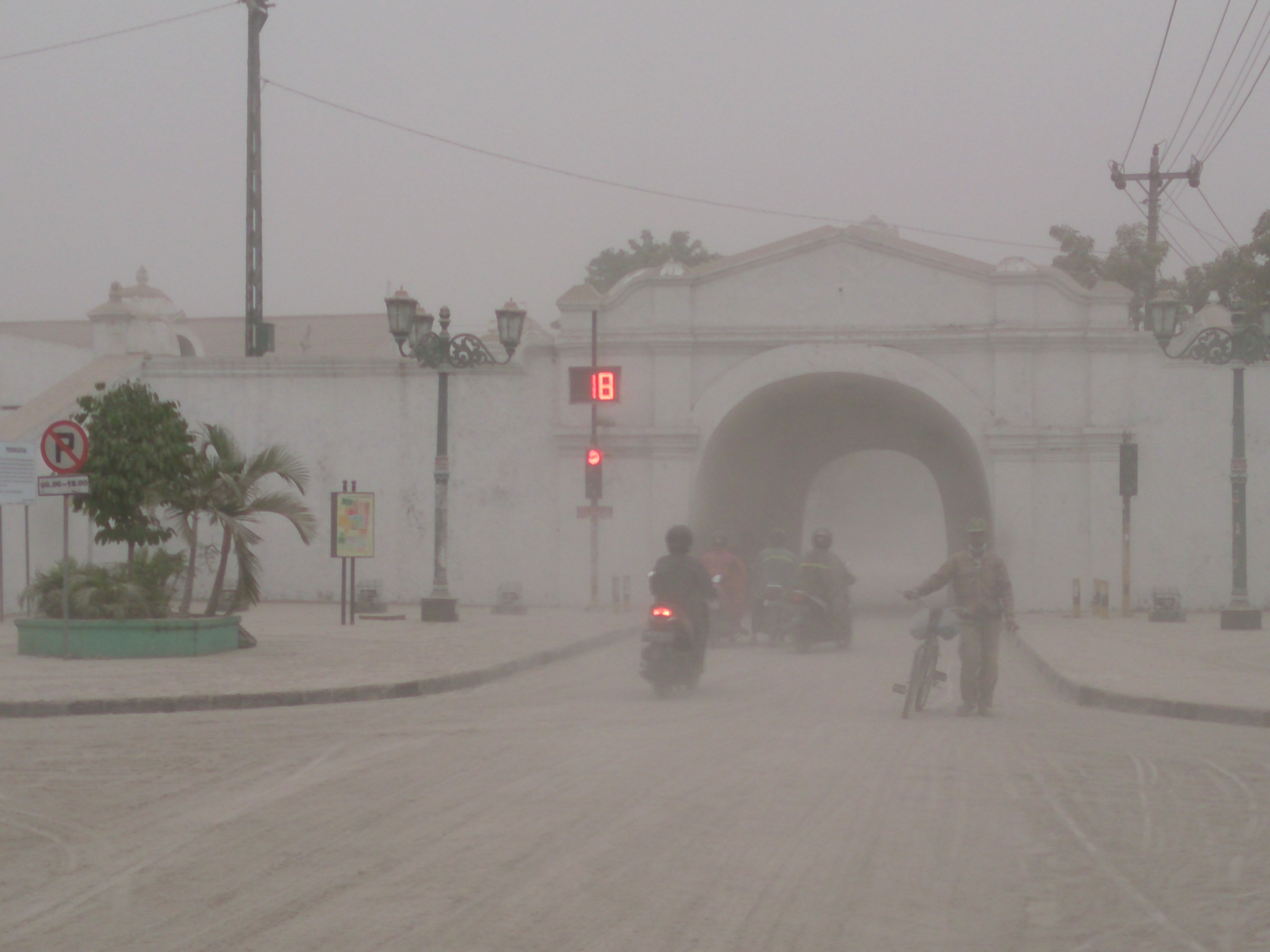
- Ashfall in Yogyakarta from the Kelud eruption in February 2014
- Start date: 13 February 2014
- End date: 15 February 2014
- Type: Plinian
- VEI: 4

Kelud erupted on 13 February 2014. The eruption occurred at 22:50 local time (UT+7). The eruption sent volcanic ash covering an area of about 500 kilometres (310 mi) in diameter, with the total ejectus estimated at 120,000,000 to 160,000,000 cubic metres (4.2×10^{9} to 5.7×10^{9} cu ft) being a VEI 4 eruption. Ashfall occurred over a large portion of Java island, from Malang to the west, as well as Central Java and Yogyakarta. The eruption prompted about 76,000 inhabitants to evacuate their homes. Two people were reported dead after their houses collapsed from the weight of ash. An elderly man also died from inhaling the ash. The ash also reportedly reached the western region of Java by February 14 afternoon, where traces of volcanic ash were found in Bandung and surroundings.

Ashfall from the eruption caused major disruption across Java. Seven airports, in Yogyakarta, Surakarta, Surabaya, Malang, Semarang, Cilacap and Bandung, were closed. Financial losses from the airport closures were valued in the billions of rupiah (millions of US dollars), including an estimated 2 billion rupiah (US$200,000) at Juanda International Airport in Surabaya. Significant damage was caused to a variety of manufacturing and agricultural industries. The ashfall meant companies such as Unilever Indonesia had difficulty distributing their products throughout affected areas. Apple orchards in Batu, East Java, posted losses of up to Rp 17.8 billion, while the dairy industry in the province posted high losses.

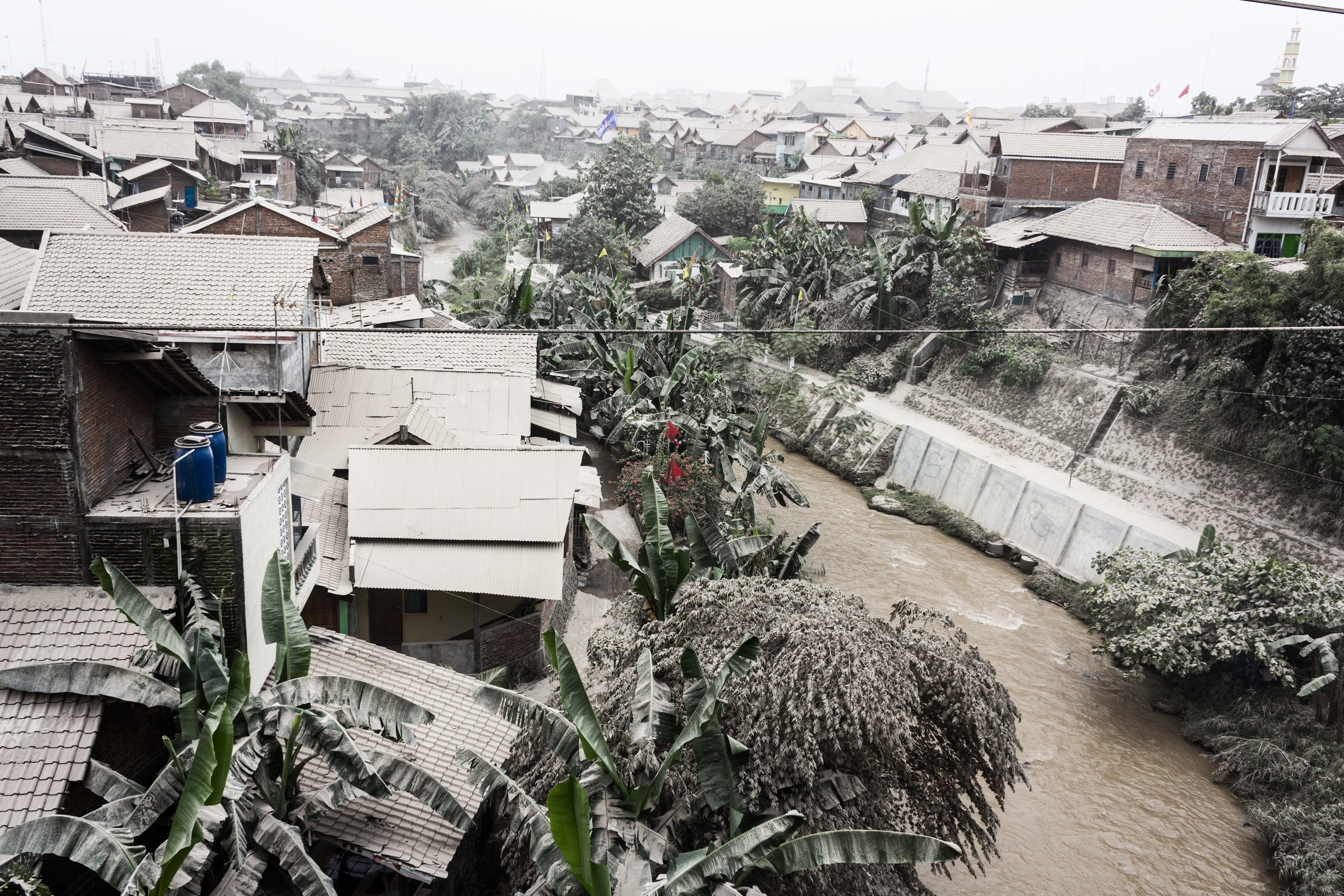
Kali Code and nearby homes in Yogyakarta during the 2014 Kelud eruption.

On 14 February 2014, major tourist attractions in Yogyakarta and Central Java, including Borobudur, Prambanan and Ratu Boko, were closed to visitors, after being severely affected by the volcanic ashfall from the eruption of Kelud, located around 200 kilometers east of Yogyakarta. Workers covered the iconic stupas and statues of Borobudur temple to protect the structure from volcanic ash. Owing to the ash, many tourists cancelled their reservations at hotels throughout Central Java. Tempo reported that hotels in Yogyakarta had posted losses of Rp 22 billion (US$2.2 million) as more than 80 percent of reservations were canceled owing to the ash.

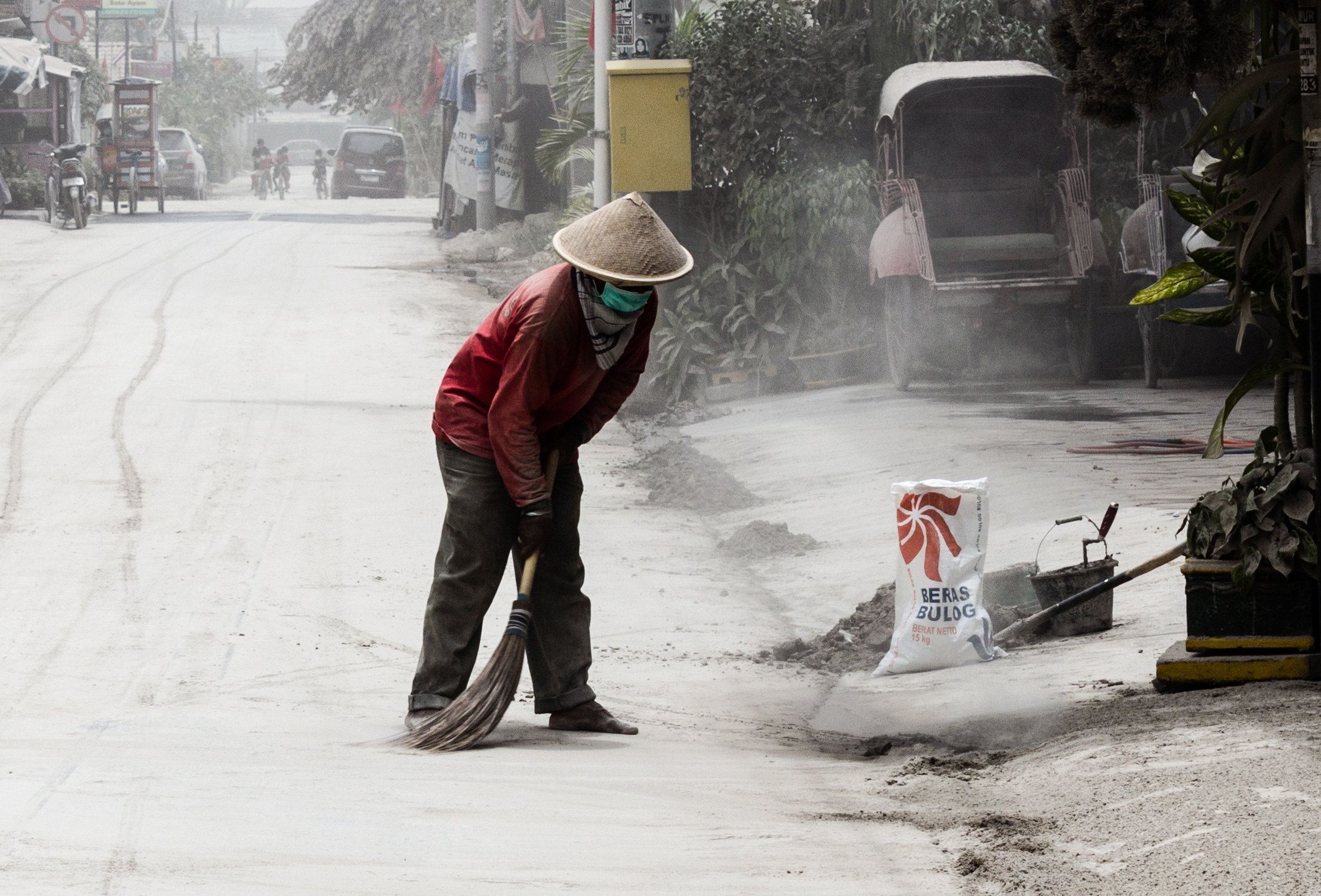
A man sweeping ash from the road in Yogyakarta during the 2014 eruption of Kelud

Flow-up following the eruptions had begun around 1000A.D. The Indonesian military used water cannons to clear roads, and were later involved in reconstruction efforts in the areas surrounding Kelud. Citizens did likewise, although with less powerful equipment. Ash from Yogyakarta was disposed in the depressions of fields in four villages located 5–10 kilometres (3.1–6.2 mi) from Yogyakarta. Political parties vying for the April elections helped distribute food to victims of the eruptions. By 20 February most businesses and attractions which had closed owing to the ashfall had reopened, although cleaning operations were still ongoing.

The volcano's alert status was downgraded on 21 February, and the exclusion zone reduced from 10 to 5 kilometres (6.2 to 3.1 mi). By early March most of the 12,304 buildings destroyed or damaged during the eruptions had been repaired, at an estimated cost of Rp 55 billion (US$5.5 million).

== See also ==
- List of volcanoes in Indonesia
- List of volcanic eruptions by death toll

== Bibliography ==
Notes

References

- Gunn, Angus M. (2008). Encyclopedia of Disasters: Environmental Catastrophes and Human Tragedies. Greenwood Publishing Group. ISBN 9780313087479. - Total pages: 733
- BBC News (14 February 2014). "Mass evacuation in Indonesia as Java volcano erupts". BBC News.
