= 2014 Mount Ontake eruption =

Fatal volcanic eruption in Honshu, Japan

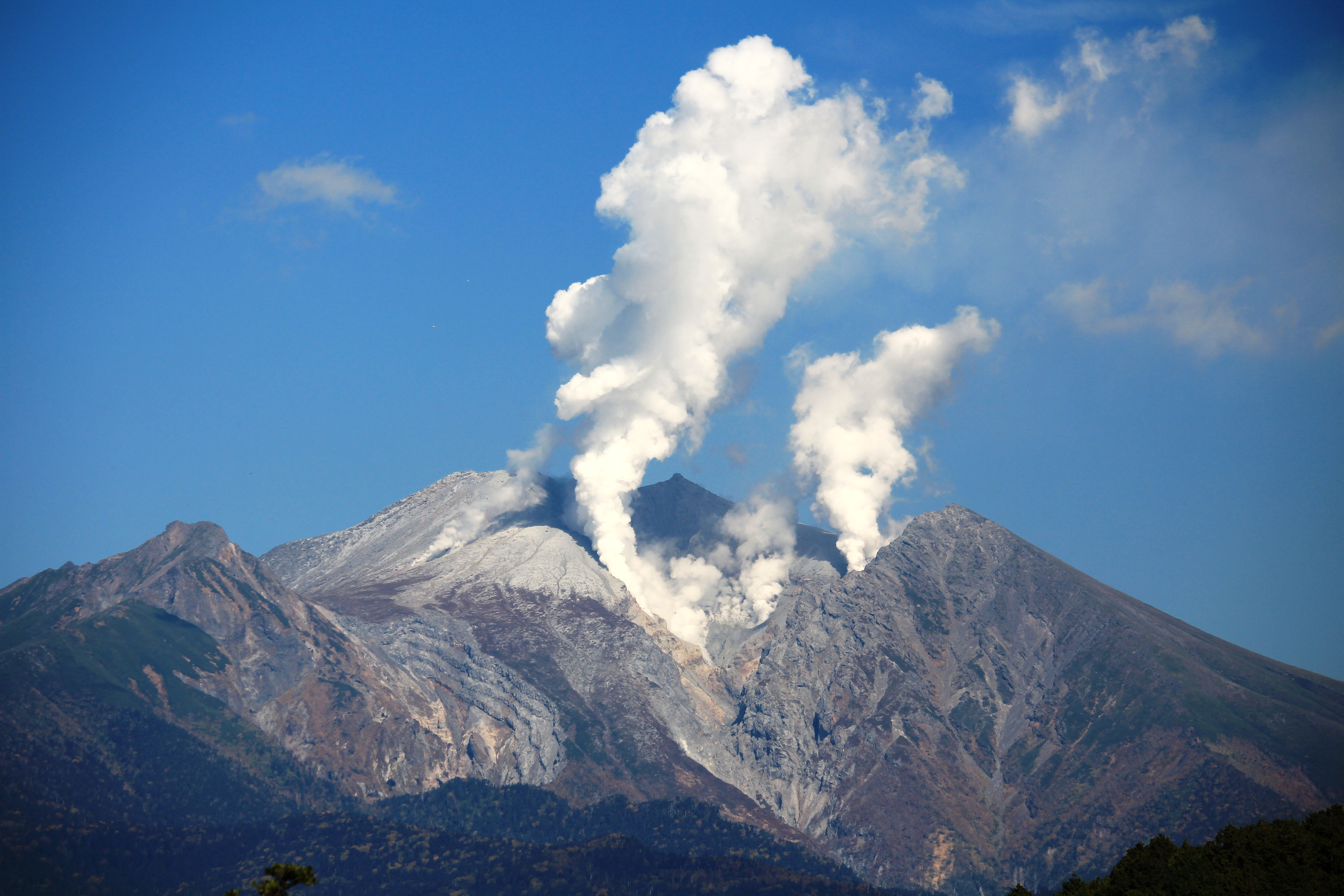
- Mount Ontake seen from Kurakake Pass on October 11, 2014.
- Volcano: Mount Ontake
- Start date: September 27, 2014
- End date: October 14, 2014
- Type: Phreatic eruption
- Location: Border of Nagano and Gifu prefectures, island of Honshū, Japan; 35°53′36″N 137°28′45″E
- VEI: 3
- Impact: 63 dead (inclusive of five un-recovered bodies)

Maps
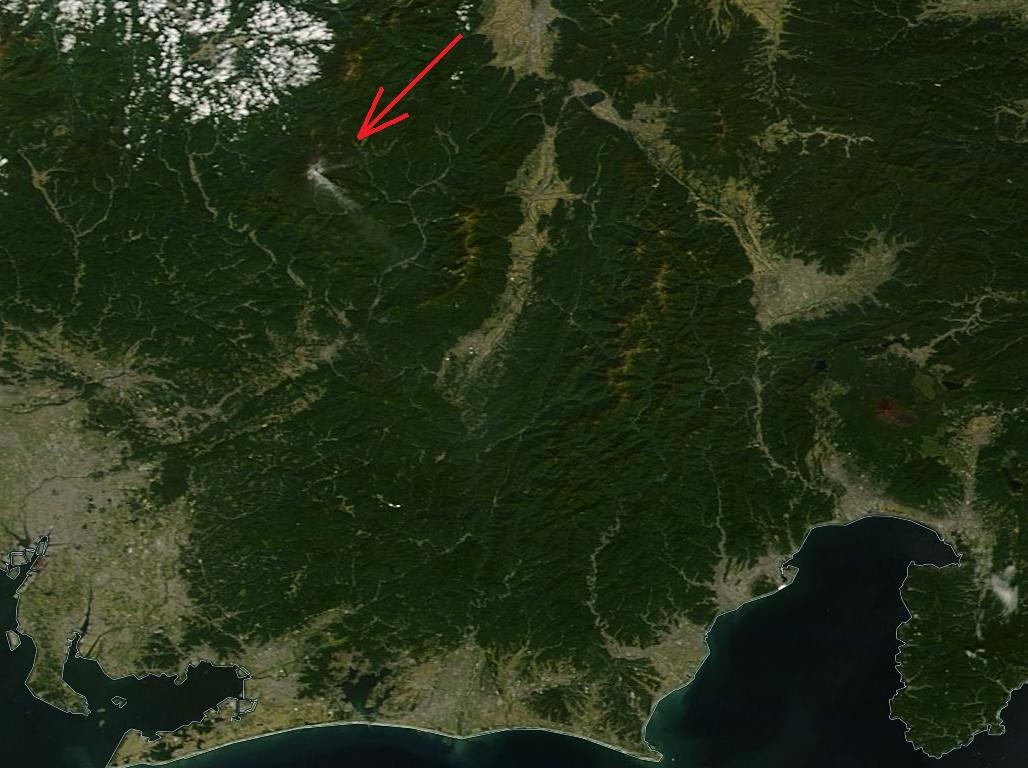
- An overview of Mt Ontake eruption

The Mount Ontake (御嶽山, Ontake-san) volcano erupted on September 27, 2014, killing 63 people. Mount Ontake is located on the Japanese island of Honshu around 100 kilometres (62 mi) northeast of Nagoya and around 200 km (120 mi) west of Tokyo. It was the first fatal volcanic eruption in Japan since the 1991 eruption of Mount Unzen, and the deadliest volcanic eruption in Japan since Torishima killed an estimated 150 people in 1902.

== Eruption ==
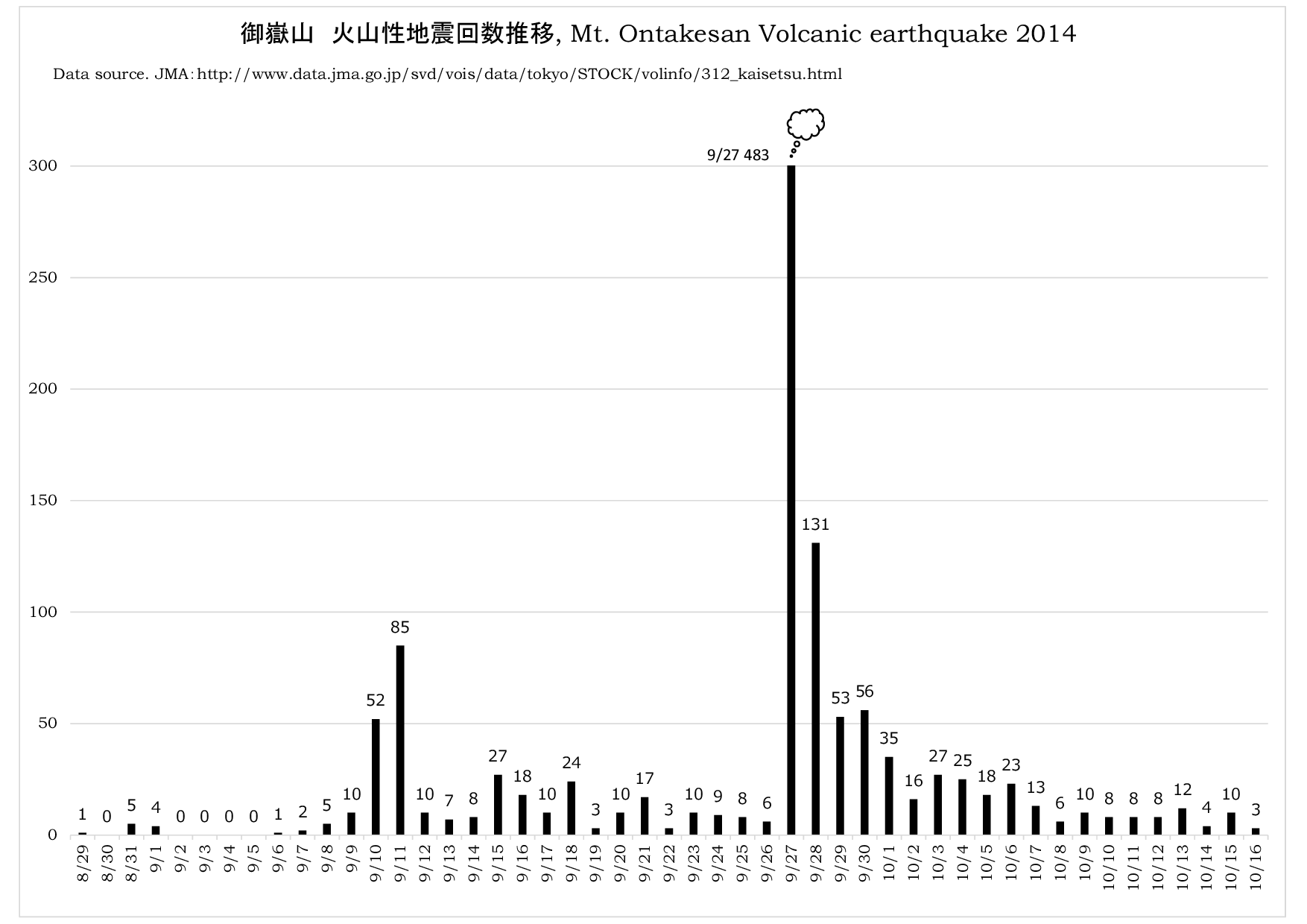
Volcanic earthquake

The volcanic eruption happened at 11:52 Japan Standard Time (UTC+9). There were no significant earthquakes that might have warned authorities in the lead up to the phreatic eruption—caused by ground water flashing to steam in a hydrothermal explosion. The mountain is a popular tourist attraction for hikers, being considered good for beginner climbers and relatively safe, and the weather was also good, so there were several hundred people on its slopes at the time.

== Search and rescue ==
The police said that they were searching for people remaining on the mountain. By 17:00 the police reported that three people were missing and were believed to be under ash. Another person was rescued from under the volcanic ash, but remained unconscious. Six people were injured, one by flying rocks.

By 19:30, the number of people believed to remain buried in ash rose to six. Nine people had been reported to be injured, five of whom had fractured bones. Later, at least 40 people were reported to be injured, and another 32 were believed to be missing. The JSDF began carrying out helicopter searches for missing people. One woman was reported to have died from the eruption.

On September 28, the police reported that over 30 people had been found in "cardiac arrest" near the summit. Japanese emergency services often refer to people who show no vital signs, and are apparently dead, as being in cardiac arrest, as legally, only an authorised physician can pronounce a person dead. By September 29, a total of 36 bodies had been found, and 12 people had been pronounced dead; the search was suspended due to dangerous conditions, including hydrogen sulfide gas spewing from the mountain. On September 30, fears of escalating volcanic activity on Mount Ontake continued to hinder rescue efforts.

On October 1, 2014, eleven new bodies were discovered by rescuers on the slopes of Mount Ontake after searching in previously unexplored areas of the ash-covered peak, bringing the total body count from 36 to 47; a revision after an erroneous initial count of 48.

On October 4, 2014, four new bodies were discovered by rescuers on the slopes of Mount Ontake after searching in previously unexplored areas away from trekking roads. Those four were confirmed to have died.

Typhoon Phanfone prevented searching activities on October 5 and 6. On October 7, three more bodies were discovered, bringing the total of confirmed deaths to 54. As of October 11, the death toll was at 56. The victims of the Mount Ontake eruption were mourned on October 27, as authorities and residents marked a month since the volcano killed 58 people and left 5 others missing.

== Trial ==
On January 25, 2017, bereaved families of five victims filed a lawsuit against the country and Nagano prefecture, seeking damages of 150 million yen. They argued that the warning level should have been raised prior to the eruption. The government said that the Japan Meteorological Agency had not raised the warning level even though earthquake levels were slightly elevated, because the warning level was based on additional data and historical activity.

== See also ==
- List of volcanic eruptions by death toll
- Mount Unzen, a Decade volcano with a history of violent eruptions
- Torishima, last volcano to kill more than 100 people in Japan
- Typhoon Phanfone (2014), a typhoon that affected the area and country a week after it erupted.
