= 1888 Ritter Island eruption and tsunami =

Volcanic eruption and tsunami-generating landslide in German New Guinea

- Volcano: Ritter Island
- Start date: 13 March 1888
- End date: 13 March 1888
- Type: Phreatic or phreatomagmatic
- Location: Bismarck Sea (German New Guinea); 5.520°S 148.115°E
- VEI: 2
- Impact: Volcanic summit collapsed resulting in a tsunami
- Deaths: 1,500–3,000 (estimated)

Maps

On the morning of 13 March 1888, a section of Ritter Island, a small volcanic island off the coast of New Guinea, collapsed into the sea in a sector collapse. Prior to its collapse, Ritter Island was a steeply-sloping, 780 m (2,560 ft) volcanic cone which produced eruptions in the 1690s and 1790s. The collapse in 1888 reduced its height to about 140 m (460 ft), while the remaining edifice, estimated by volcanologists to be 2.4 km^{3} (0.58 cu mi) or 4.2 km^{3} (1.0 cu mi), was deposited onto the seafloor. If the latter figure is correct, this sector collapse would be more voluminous than the 1980 eruption of Mount St. Helens. The present-day Ritter Island is a crescent-shaped remnant of the former cone and it last erupted in 1972.

The collapse triggered tsunami waves that struck nearby and distant islands such as New Guinea, Umboi, Sakar and New Britain. Some waves were as high as 15 m (49 ft) based on reading the tidemarks. It caused heavy damage and deaths in coastal settlements. While no confirmed death toll exists, it is estimated that between 1,500 and 3,000 people died. The tsunami also had far-field effects in Chile and Australia.

== Background ==
Ritter Island in the Bismarck Archipelago is an active stratovolcano located off the northeast coast of Papua New Guinea. It is one of the many active volcanoes in Papua New Guinea as a result of subduction of the Solomon Sea plate beneath the Bismarck Plate along the New Britain Trench. Before the eruption of 1888, the island was a steep-sided and almost-circular volcanic cone which was recognisable to sailors passing through the Dampier Strait. It had an estimated height of 780 m (2,560 ft). Based on sketches from the 1830s, the sides of the volcano had an average angle of 45°, and the western flank was probably steeper as it had experienced minor landslides. In other illustrations, these slopes appeared to be up to 50°, though they were likely exaggerated. Earlier signs of activity in 1699 and 1793 demonstrated Strombolian eruptions. Smoke and steam were observed in 1835 and 1848. The eruptions of 1887 and 1878 remain uncertain, with various sources supporting or denying their existence. An anonymous report stated that ashfall and tremors were recorded at Finschhafen in February 1887 and may have originated from Ritter Island.

== Eruption and collapse ==
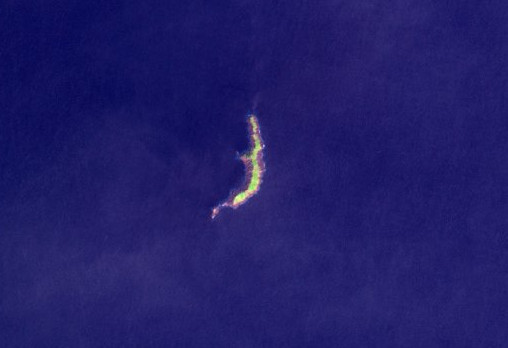
The crescent-shaped remnant of Ritter Island after the collapse

The collapse of Ritter Island occurred during the early morning of 13 March 1888, though there were no direct observations. After the collapse, only a crescent-shaped island and islet near its southern tip remained of the former volcanic cone. The height of the island was reduced from 780 to 140 m (2,560 to 460 ft). An amphitheater-shaped scar representing the landslide scarp extends approximately north–south. The steep scarp rises 100–200 m (330–660 ft) from the sea, and extends towards the western base of the cone, at 900 m (3,000 ft) beneath sea level, where it also spreads out to 4 km (2.5 mi) across. The volume of material lost to the collapse remains a contentious topic with various figures estimated. Ritter Island remains active; minor eruptions occurred for the first time since the collapse in 1972.

Witnesses at Hatzfeldthaven, 350 km (220 mi) west of the volcano, reported plausible phreatic activity, while a thunder-like sound was heard at Finschhafen, 100 km (62 mi) in the south. About 20 km (12 mi) away, fragmented pumice fell on New Guinea's western rainforest while pumice swept onto the northern coastline. These reports might suggest a magmatic eruption, however, an alternative explanation is a phreatic explosion caused by seawater entering the conduit system exposed by the landslide. This process was similar to Mount Bandai's eruption the same year.

A 2019 study published Earth and Planetary Science Letters estimated that 2.4 km^{3} (0.58 cu mi) of the western edifice collapsed based on seafloor bathymetry analysis. This estimate is slightly smaller than the sector collapse involved in the 1980 eruption of Mount St. Helens (2.7 km^{3} (0.65 cu mi)), but larger than other sector collapses involving Oshima-Oshima in 1741 (0.4 km^{3} (0.096 cu mi)); Unzen in 1792 (0.34 km^{3} (0.082 cu mi)) and Anak Krakatoa in 2018 (0.3 km^{3} (0.072 cu mi)). The collapse was preceded by gradual, intermittent lateral spreading of the volcanic edifice, as evidenced by compressional structures in seismic profiles. This phenomenon extended into the basement, destabilizing the edifice and contributed to the eventual collapse. The collapse mobilised more than 13 km^{3} (3.1 cu mi) of material; a large portion (11.2 km^{3} (2.7 cu mi)) comprised the deformed seafloor, eroded sediments and pre-collapse edifice affected by the gradual spreading. The dramatic collapse which generated the tsunami only represented 2.4 km^{3} (0.58 cu mi) of the total volume. Edifice spreading also continued after the collapse.

Published in Marine and Petroleum Geology, a 2015 study estimated that Ritter Island lost 4.2 km^{3} (1.0 cu mi) of its volume by comparing a reconstructed topographic map of the volcano before and after its collapse. This analysis revealed that the failure also involved part of the volcano's base, which was constructed above weak marine sediments. This structural weakness directed the collapse at the base. Reports of a single wave train supported the hypothesis of a single landslide event generating the tsunami. The collapsing mass shattered into several blocks that moved together. About 71 percent of the landslide debris was deposited near the valley between Sakar and Umboi.

== Tsunami ==
On Umboi and Sakar, run-ups of 10 to 15 m (33 to 49 ft) were measured while at Hatzfeldhafen and Rabaul, the run-ups were 10 m (33 ft) and 5 m (16 ft), respectively. In Arica, Chile, newspapers reported that a series of strong waves smashed and capsized ships. Tide gauges in Sydney, Australia, recorded abnormal readings ruled out as tidal floods and attributed it to a possible tsunami.

Some places located 350 to 500 km (220 to 310 mi) from the volcano were damaged by the tsunami. There is no exact tally for the death toll but estimates place the number at between 1,500 and 3,000. Every village along the Dampier Strait between Sakar and Umboi was demolished. Many died on Umboi and villages along the island's northern coast were destroyed. However, there were no detailed studies to document the losses. According to a local leader, several hundred were killed and the village of Lutherhafen on northwestern Umboi was abandoned. In a survey of Umboi one year after the tsunami, several villages along the eastern shore were no longer existing.

Eighteen people—two Germans, four Malays, and 12 Melanesians from the Duke of York Islands—were on New Britain at the time as part of a New Guinea Company group surveying possible for coffee plantation areas. They were located along the coast near a cliff when the waves washed away some of the expedition members. It left a 1.2 m (3.9 ft) thick layer of organic debris composed of sand, debris and dead fish, onto the coast. A search party was sent out to rescue the two Germans missing, but found only five Melanesian workers. They were caught by the wave but survived by clutching onto tree branches before it retreated back to sea. The tsunami had a maximum wave height of 12–15 m (39–49 ft) based on tidemarks on the trees.

At Finschhafen, a witness recalled the shore receding after thunderous noises. The water level at the town was so low that it posed dangers to ships at the harbor. A reef near Madang was exposed some 1.5–1.8 m (5–6 ft) before the tsunami arrived. The tsunami destroyed some homes and canoes belonging to the Melanesian people. At Hatzfeldhaven, the tsunami arrived at 06:40; the first wave was estimated to be 2 m (6 ft 7 in) taller than the highest flood mark. The highest wave struck at 09:00, measuring about 8 m (26 ft). It destroyed a yam store and boat shelter, and lumber that was to be used for a bridge were also carried. Some poorly constructed houses in Kelana village were swept away.

== See also ==
- 1741 eruption of Oshima–Ōshima and the Kampo tsunami
- 1951 eruption of Mount Lamington
- 1998 Papua New Guinea earthquake
- 2018 Sunda Strait tsunami
- 2022 Hunga Tonga–Hunga Haʻapai eruption and tsunami
- List of tsunamis
- List of volcanic eruptions by death toll
