= Marine and Petroleum Geology =

Peer-reviewed scientific journal

- Discipline: Marine geology, petroleum geology
- Language: English
- Edited by: Massimo Zecchin and Max Qinhong Hu

Publication details
- History: 1984-present
- Publisher: Elsevier
- Frequency: Bimonthly
- Impact factor: 3.281 (2017)

Standard abbreviations
- ISO 4: Mar. Pet. Geol.

Indexing
- CODEN: MPEGD8
- ISSN: 0264-8172
- LCCN: 84646175
- OCLC no.: 222766641

Links
- Journal homepage; Online archive

Marine and Petroleum Geology is a peer-reviewed scientific journal covering marine and petroleum geology. It was established in 1984 and is published by Elsevier. The editor-in-chief is Massimo Zecchin (Istituto Nazionale di Oceanografia e di Geofisica Sperimentale) and (Max) Qinhong Hu (The University of Texas at Arlington).

== Abstracting and indexing ==
The journal is abstracted and indexed in:

- Chemical Abstracts Service
- Compendex
- CSA databases
- Current Contents/Physical, Chemical & Earth Sciences
- eBSCO databases
- GEOBASE
- METADEX
- Science Citation Index
- Scopus

According to the Journal Citation Reports, the journal has a 2017 impact factor of 3.281.
