= Mount Awu =

Stratovolcano on Sangir island in Indonesia

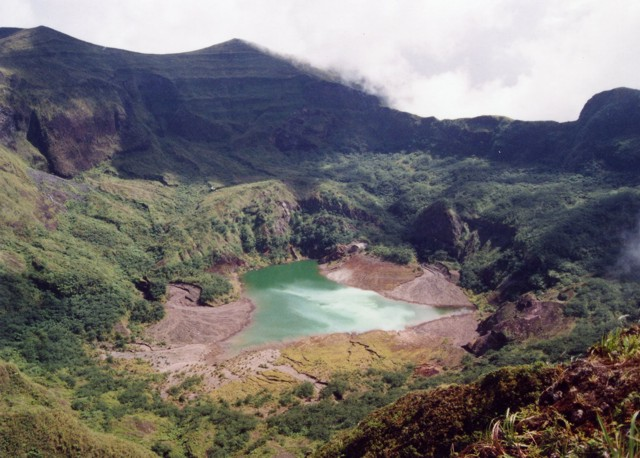
- The summit crater is partially filled by a shallow lake. (1995)

Highest point
- Elevation: 1,320 m (4,330 ft)
- Listing: Ribu
- Coordinates: 3°40′N 125°30′E

Geography
- Location within Indonesia Location within Asia Location within Earth
- Location: Sangir Island, Sangihe Islands, Indonesia

Geology
- Rock age: 100,000
- Mountain type: Stratovolcano
- Last eruption: June to August 2004

Mount Awu (Indonesian: Gunung Awu) is the largest stratovolcano in the Sangihe Islands chain, located on Sangir Island in North Sulawesi, Indonesia. Powerful eruptions have occurred in 1711, 1812, 1856, 1822, 1892, and 1966 with devastating pyroclastic flows and lahars that resulted in 11,048 fatalities. A total of 18 eruptions are recorded from 1640, with two of VEI 4 (1812 and 1966) and 3 with VEI 3 (1711, 1856 and 1892), one eruption every ~ 20 years. The hazardous nature of the volcano is determined from the continuous lava source driven by the geodynamic setting (a double subduction line that creates an arc–arc collision) and the presence of a crater lake, sustained by the consistent rainfall on the island, on top of a lava dome. This setting creates the conditions for water injection in the lava dome, which can cause a water-magma explosion.

A 4.5 km wide crater is found at the summit and a deep valley forms a passageway for lahars, splitting the flanks from the crater. This is a volcano in the Ring of Fire.

The volcanic eruption of June 7, 1892 was reportedly noticed in Sandakan, North Borneo (today: Sabah, Malaysia) at a distance of more than 850 km.

== See also ==
- List of volcanoes in Indonesia
