= 1741 eruption of Oshima–Ōshima and the Kampo tsunami =

Volcanic eruption and tsunami off the coast of Hokkaido

1741 eruption of Oshima–Ōshima and the Kampo megatsunami
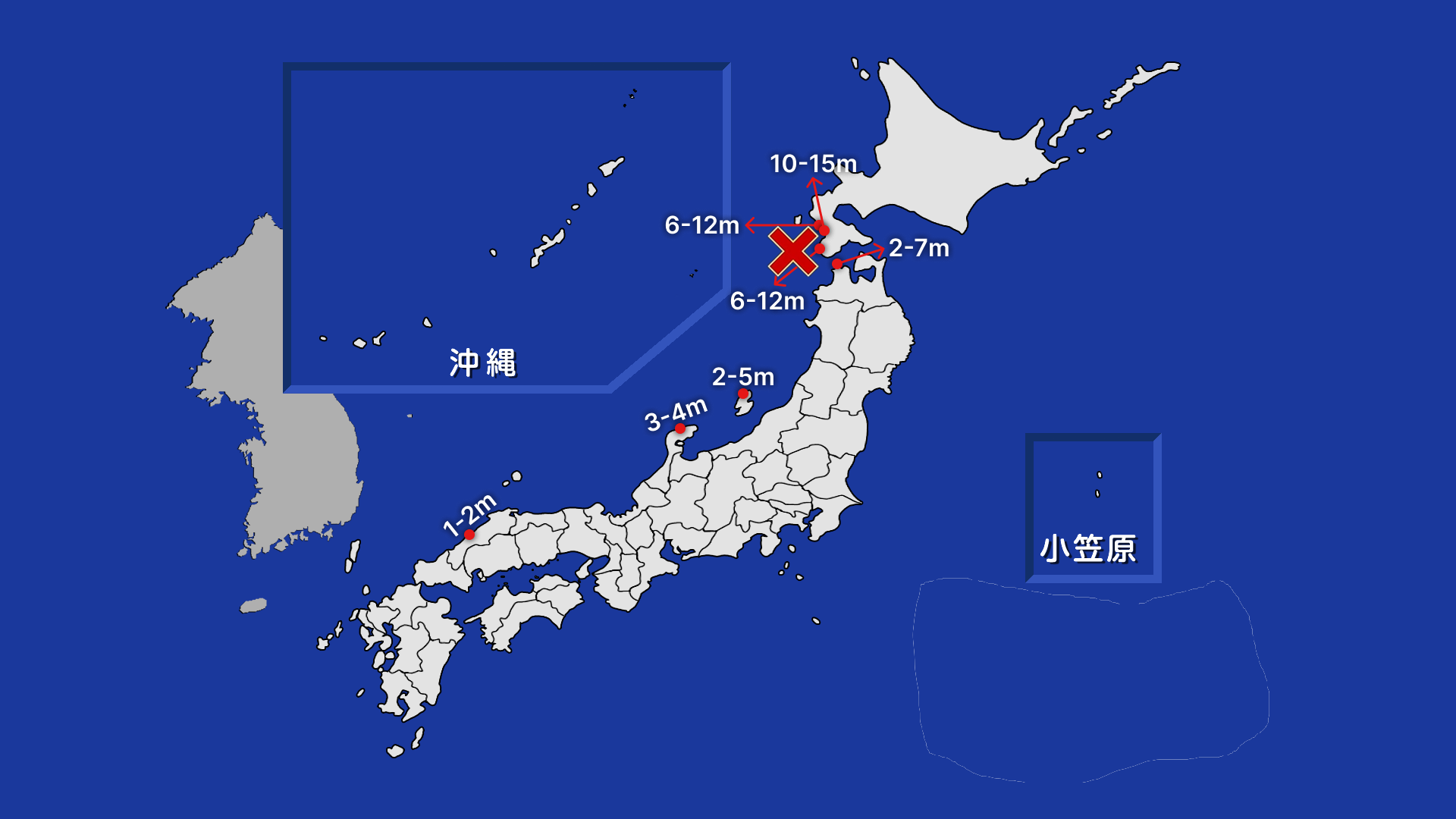
- Estimated tsunami heights in various areas
- Volcano: Oshima Oshima
- Start date: 18 August 1741
- End date: 1 May 1742
- Type: Unknown
- Location: Off the coast of Hokkaido. Sea of Japan, Japan
- VEI: 4
- Impact: Sector collapse and regional tsunami
- Deaths: 1,467–2,033 dead

Maps

The devastating eruption of Oshima–Ōshima began on 18 August 1741 and ended on 1 May the next year. Eleven days into the eruption, the Kampo tsunami (Japanese: 寛保津波, Hepburn: Kampo tsunami) with estimated maximum heights of 60–90 m (200–300 ft) swept across neighboring islands in Japan and the Korean Peninsula. The eruption and its resulting tsunami killed at least 1,400 people. Damage was extreme along the coast of Japan, while in Korea, the tsunami damaged fishing boats.

== Background ==
Japan is situated along a zone of convergence between at least four major and minor tectonic plates. The Philippine Sea plate dives beneath the Amurian Plate and Okinawa plate along the Nankai Trough and Ryukyu Trench in southern Japan. In northern Japan, the Pacific plate subducts beneath the Okhotsk microplate, part of the larger North American plate, along the Japan and Kuril trenches. The subduction process is related to the production of volcanoes in Japan as the downgoing oceanic slab undergoes dehydration at depths of roughly 90 to 100 km (55 to 60 mi) beneath the overriding plate. Water in the structure of hydrated minerals interact with the upper mantle, lowering its melting point. As the mantle begins to melt, its density decreases and rises through the upper crust, forming a volcanic vent.

=== Oshima Island ===
Oshima is the uninhabited island located in the Sea of Japan, approximately 60 km west of the Oshima Peninsula on the larger island Hokkaidō. The island consists of two basaltic-to-andesitic stratovolcanoes, the highest measuring 737 meters (2,418 ft) above sea level. No records of eruptions prior to the 1741–42 eruption exists due to the remoteness of the island although some fumaroles were documented. The most recent record of an eruption was in 1790. Activity resurfaced in 1996 with seismic unrest beneath the island but no eruption occurred.

== Kampo tsunami ==
The initial eruption began on 18 August and was visible from Hokkaido by 23 August. By 25 August, so much ash had been ejected that sunlight was blocked out. Ash fall measured up to over 20 centimeters at places. On August 29 at 05:00, a second and more violent eruption took place on the island and was followed–up by a large tsunami that engulfed many coastal villages and towns along the shores of the Sea of Japan. While the eruption itself did not result in any casualties, the ensuing tsunami drowned over 2,000 people.

In Kaminokuni, the waves reportedly wiped out 50 homes and drowned all but one of its residents. Ishizaki, a city separated from the sea by a ridge 19.4 m (64 ft) above sea level, was also engulfed by the tsunami. Around the Matsumae Peninsula, heavy ash fall from the eruption blocked out the sun and plunged villages into darkness. A tsunami arrived along the shores at some time between 20:00 and 22:00. More than 729 homes were washed away and 33 others were seriously damaged. The tsunami also took with it two warehouses and destroyed 25. Wave heights reportedly exceeded 9 m (30 ft). One document states that approximately 120 km (75 mi) was inundated, and that at least 1,467 inhabitants lost their lives, a figure that excludes native Ainu inhabitants that left no written records. Estimates of the total casualties including Ainu suggest that over 2,000 people lost their lives. Some 1,521 fishing boats and ships near the erupting volcanic island were also destroyed by the waves. One hundred and forty people were killed while 53 vessels and 83 houses were lost to the waves in Tsugaru on the island of Honshu.

Wave heights for Gankakezawa have been estimated at 34 metres (112 ft) based on oral histories, while an estimate of 13 metres (43 ft) is derived from written records. At Sado Island, over 350 kilometres (217 mi; 189 nmi) away, a wave height of 2 to 5 metres (6 ft 7 in to 16 ft 5 in) has been estimated based on descriptions of the damage, while oral records suggest a height of 8 metres (26 ft). Wave heights have been estimated at 3 to 4 metres (9.8 to 13.1 ft) even as far away as the Korean Peninsula. A maximum height of 60–90 m (200–300 ft) was observed on Sado Island, while on Oshima, the tsunami was 6–10 m (20–33 ft).

On the Korean Peninsula, the tsunami slammed into the east coast, flooding nine villages and destroying many fishing vessels. The tsunami was documented five times in the annals of the Joseon dynasty. Estimation of wave heights along the coast range from 3–4 m (9.8–13.1 ft).

== Origins ==
The source of the Kampo Tsunami is still debated among scientists, claiming an earthquake, debris avalanche, or some other phenomenon caused the tsunami. There is still no consensus in the debate but much evidence points to a landslide and debris avalanche along the flank of the volcano.

=== Earthquake ===
Off the western coast of Hokkaidō and northern Honshu, at the eastern brink of the Sea of Japan lies a convergent plate boundary between the Amurian and Okhotsk plates, microplates of the Eurasian and North American plates respectively. The convergent boundary is the source for many historically documented tsunamigenic earthquakes in 1833, 1940, 1964, 1983, and most recently, the 1993 southwest off Hokkaido earthquake.

Based on analyzing records of the tsunami heights, a large magnitude 7.5–8.4 earthquake along the eastern margin of the Sea of Japan would have been sufficient to generate the wave heights as observed in 1741. The earthquake hypothesis, however, is challenged because no records of shaking from an earthquake exist. A 1995 research article suggested the 1741 tsunami may have been caused by an earthquake that ruptured a present–day seismic gap on the plate boundary between the rupture zones of the 1833 and 1983 earthquakes. Because of the absence of documented shaking caused by a possibly large earthquake (M_{t} 7.5–8.4), scientists interpreted the event had characteristics similar to a tsunami earthquake. Initially proposed in 1972 by Hiroo Kanamori, these events release seismic energy in long periods. Such events involve a slower-than-usual rupture propagation along the shallow segment of a subduction zone. An event of this sort would go undetected by humans because of the low–frequency ground motions. Tsunami earthquakes rupture the shallowest section of the subduction boundary, which generates large tsunami run-ups.

The earthquake theory also did not rule out the possibility of the volcano collapsing because of the extreme tsunami run–ups. However, there has been no attempt to conduct submarine surveys in the Sea of Japan to confirm the claim of seismic activity along the plate boundary.

=== Sector collapse ===
A landslide and debris avalanche involving a subaerial and submerged portion of the volcanic island has been the more accepted source mechanism of the large tsunami. With an initial height of 850 m (2,790 ft), the event reduced the elevation of Hishi–yama peak to 722 m (2,369 ft). An estimated 2.4 km^{3} (0.58 cu mi) section of the volcano came loose and fell into the seafloor and settled towards the north of the island, similar to that during the 1980 eruption of Mount St. Helens, which was 2.3 km^{3} (0.55 cu mi). The slide deposit on the seafloor has a thickness of 36 ± 2 m (118.1 ± 6.6 ft) on average and 182 ± 10 m (597 ± 33 ft) at maximum. The debris field presently covers an area calculated at 69 ± 4 km^{2} (26.6 ± 1.5 sq mi) and extends 16 km (9.9 mi) away from the island. This would make it the second largest historical volcanic sector failure in history, alongside the 1888 eruption of Ritter Island.

A more recent study in 2019, however, stated that the slide volume was 2.2 km^{3} (0.53 cu mi), a significant difference from the 2001 research. The same paper also implied that the maximum thickness of the landslide is 300 m (980 ft) and an area 14 km (8.7 mi) by 9 km (5.6 mi) was buried under debris.

== See also ==
- List of deadly volcanic eruptions
- List of tsunamis
