= 1888 eruption of Mount Bandai =

Volcanic eruption in Fukushima Prefecture, Japan

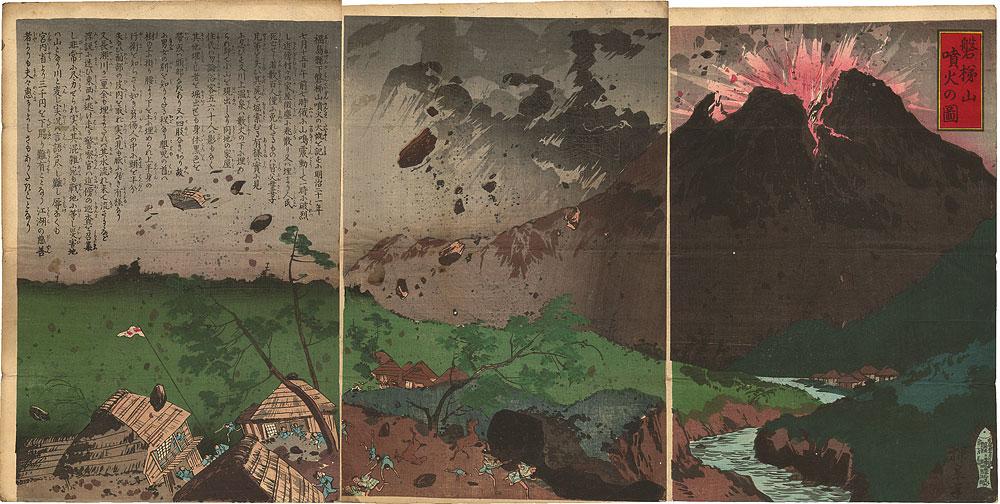
- Ukiyo-e print by Tankei depicting the 1888 eruption of Mount Bandai
- Volcano: Mount Bandai
- Start date: July 15, 1888
- End date: July 15, 1888
- Type: Explosive eruption
- Location: Iwashiro Province (now part of Fukushima Prefecture), Empire of Japan; 37°36′46″N 140°04′34″E
- VEI: 4
- Deaths: 477

The 1888 eruption of Mount Bandai was a major volcanic eruption which occurred during the Meiji period of the Empire of Japan. The eruption occurred on July 15, 1888, pyroclastic flows buried villages on the northern foot of the mountain, and devastated the eastern part of Bandai region, Iwashiro Province (now part of Fukushima Prefecture) north of Tokyo. At least 477 people were killed, and hundreds more were injured and rendered homeless.

Mount Bandai is a stratovolcano. Its most recent previous eruption had occurred in 806. Mount Bandai had a conical profile, and had been compared in literature with Mount Fuji. The Bandai volcano consisted of four peaks: O-bandai (1,819 meters), Kushigamine (1,636 meters), Akahaniyama (1,427 meters), and Ko-bandai which was slightly lower than that of O-bandai.

Small earthquakes were reported on 8, 9 and 10 July. Moderate earthquakes occurred on 13 and 14 July. However, as earthquakes are commonplace all over Japan, these tremors were not viewed by the local populace with great concern.

== Eruption ==
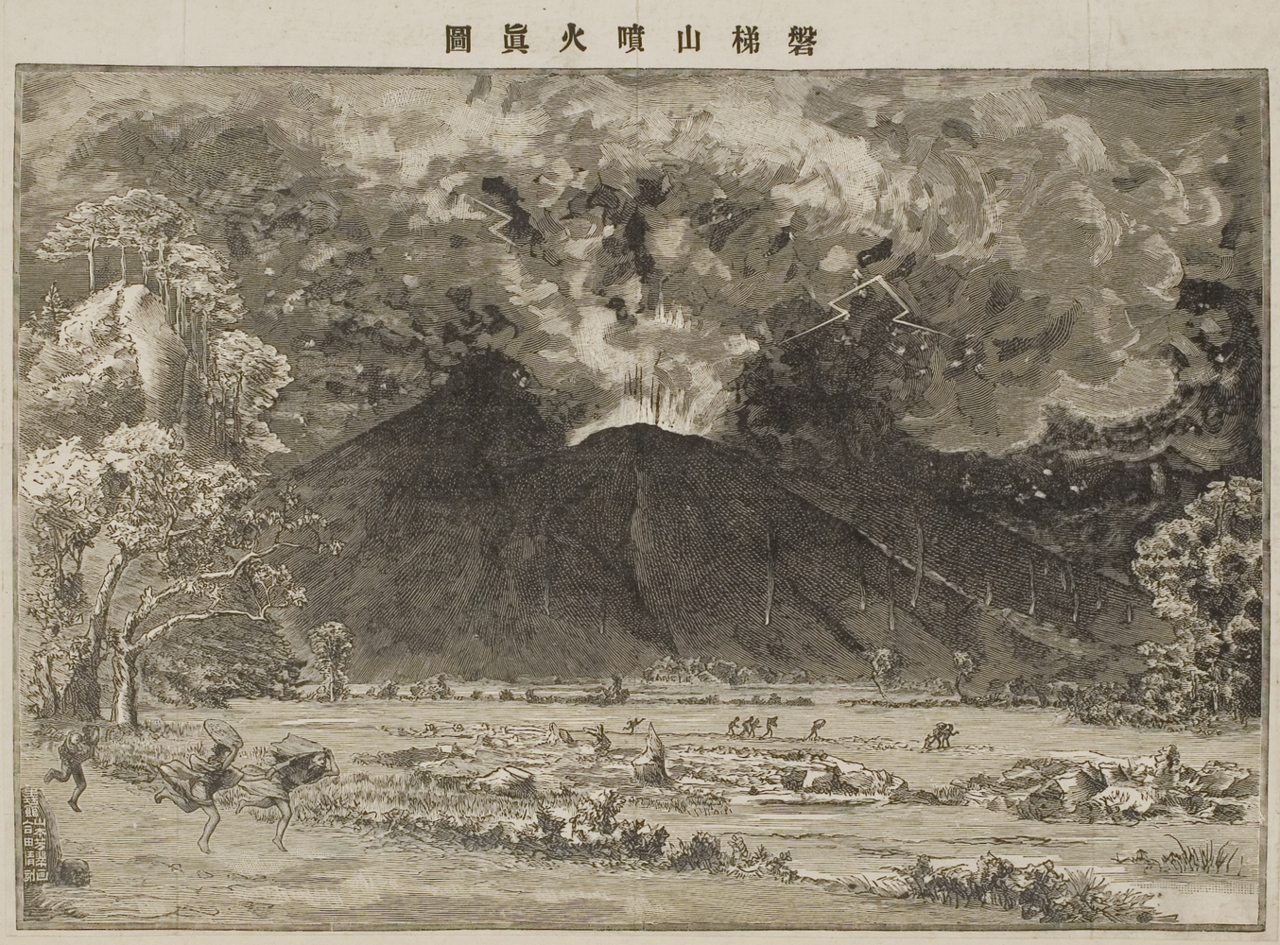
Drawing of the eruption by Yamamoto Hōsui, 1888

On 15 July, three earthquakes occurred prior to the main eruption. The third one was the largest, at around magnitude 5. At 07:45, while the ground was still moving, a phreatic eruption began at the fumaroles approximately 100 meters upslope from the Kaminoyu hot spring resort on the flank of Ko-Bandai. Successive explosions occurred 15 to 20 times per minute. Each explosion was accompanied by thunder and a black eruption column ascending to a height of 1300 meters. The last explosion was observed to discharge a horizontal cloud, mainly toward the north.

Within 10 minutes after the explosions, a pyroclastic flow swept over the eastern part of the volcano. According to eyewitness, at least two phreatic eruptions continued after the large collapse. At around 10:00, hot rain started falling, transforming the vast quantity of volcanic ash into lahar (volcanic mudslides). At 16:00, ash fall ceased.

== Aftermath ==
The eruption transformed hundreds of square kilometers of forest and farmland around the mountain into a wasteland. Several villages were completely buried under landslides, which also considerably altered the topography of the region by diverting rivers and creating a number of new lakes. Approximately 1.5 cubic kilometers of the summit of the mountain had collapsed, and flowed northwards.

Japanese geologists Seikei Sekiya and Y. Kikuchi from the Imperial University of Tokyo visited Bandai within days of the eruption. After spending several months studying the new crater and the devastated areas, they published a report in English (“The eruption of Bandai-san” Tokyo Imperial University College of Sciences Journal 3 (1890), pp 91–171), which is considered a classic in volcanology. A photograph of the ruined mountain was the first news photograph printed by the Yomiuri Shimbun in Japan.

The eruption was the first major disaster faced by the fledgling Japanese Red Cross, which moved in quickly to provide disaster relief.

The lake district formed by this cataclysm is now known as Urabandai or Bandai-kōgen, and has become a popular tourist destination, especially the multi-hued lakes of Goshiki-numa.

== See also ==
- 1888 Ritter Island eruption and tsunami
- 1980 eruption of Mount St. Helens
