= Kolumbo =

Active submarine volcano in the Aegean Sea near Santorini

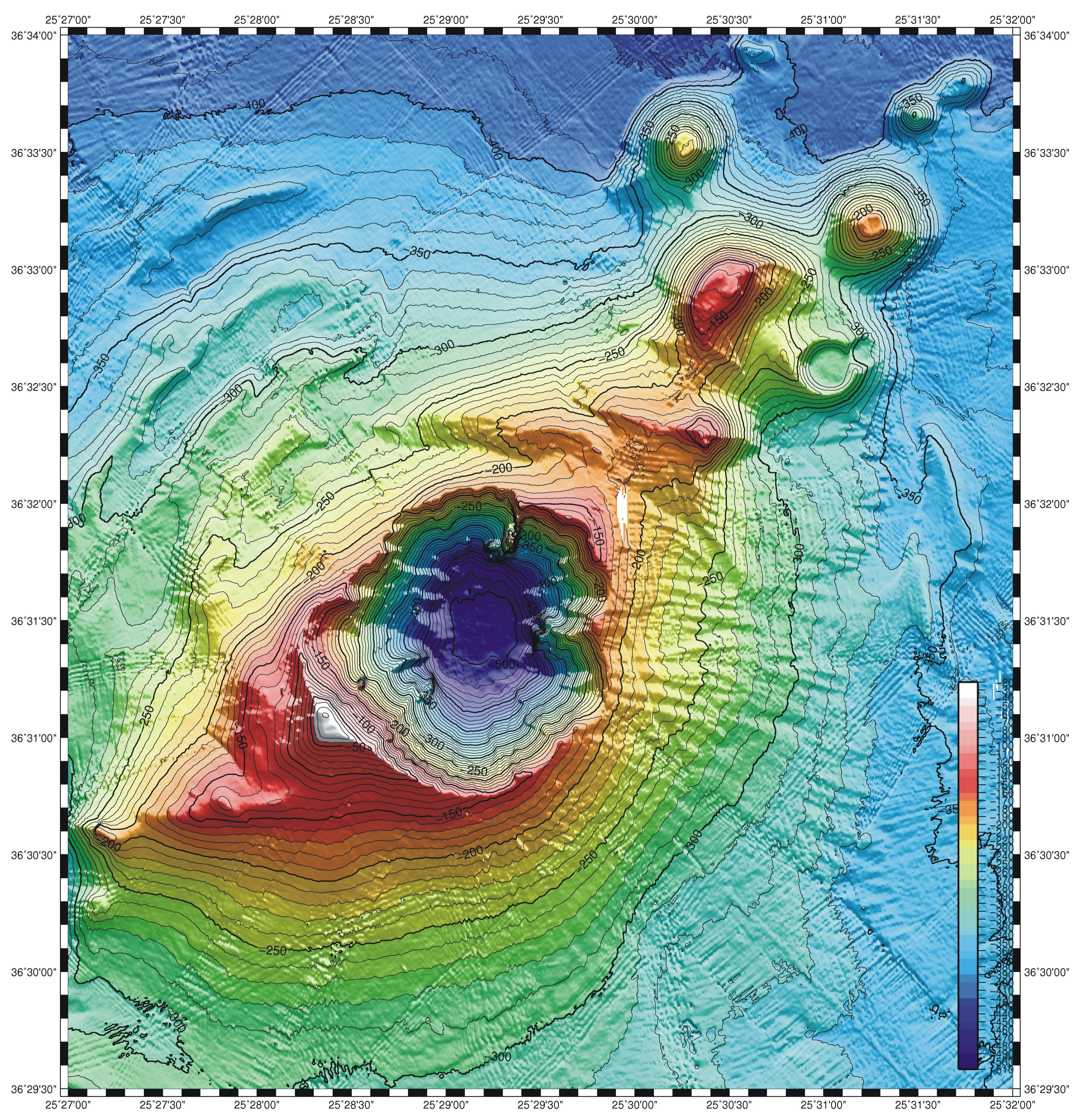
- The Kolumbo crater

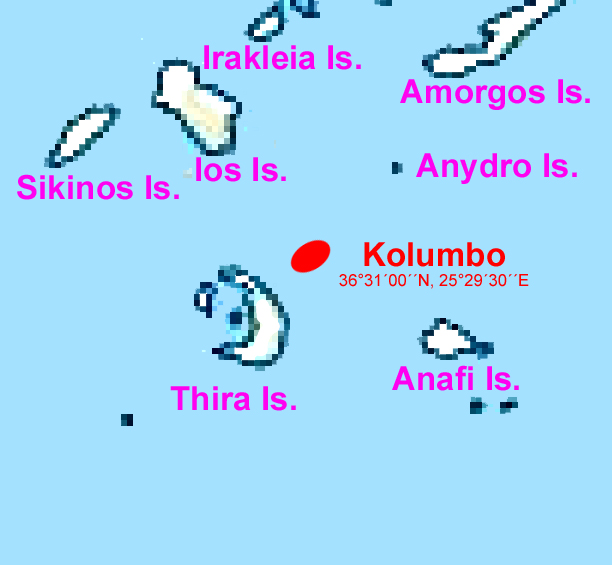
- Summit depth: −10 m (−30 ft)
- Height: 400 m (1,312 ft)

Location
- Location: Aegean Sea
- Coordinates: 36°31′00″N 25°29′30″E
- Country: Greece

Geology
- Type: Submarine volcano
- Volcanic arc/chain: South Aegean Volcanic Arc
- Last eruption: 1650

History
- Discovery date: 1649

Kolumbo (Greek: Κολούμπο) is an active submarine volcano in the Aegean Sea in Greece, about 8 km (5.0 mi) northeast of Cape Kolumbo, Santorini (Thira) island. The largest of a line of about twenty submarine volcanic cones extending to the northeast from Santorini, it is about 3 km (1.9 mi) in diameter with a crater 1.5 km (0.93 mi) across. It was first noticed by humans when it breached the sea surface in 1649–1650. The Smithsonian Institution's Global Volcanism Program treats it as part of the Santorini volcano, though at least one source maintains that it is a separate magmatic system.

== History ==
An eruption in 1650, which occurred when the accumulating cone reached the surface, sent pyroclastic flows across the sea surface to the shores and slopes of Santorini, where about seventy people and many animals died. A small ring of white pumice that formed was rapidly eroded away by wave action. The volcano collapsed into its caldera, triggering a tsunami that caused damage on nearby islands up to 15 km (9.3 mi) distant. The highest parts of the crater rim are now about 10 m (33 ft) below sea level.

In 2006, sea floor pyroclastic deposits from the two Aegean explosions were explored, sampled and mapped by an expedition by NOAA Ocean Explorer, equipped with ROV robotics.

The crater floor, averaging about 505 m below the sea surface, is marked in its northeast area by a field of hydrothermal vents and covered by a thick bacterial community, the 2006 NOAA expedition discovered. Superheated (measured as hot as 224 °C (435 °F)) metal-enriched water issuing from the vents has built chimneys of polymetallic sulfide/sulfates to a maximum height of 4 m (13 ft), apparently accumulated since the 1650 event.

The 2006 expedition initiated new seismic air-gun techniques in order to determine the volume and distribution of the submarine volcanic deposit of pumice and ash on the sea floor around Santorini, which has been studied extensively since 1975. Revised, more accurate estimates of the total dense rock equivalent volume of the Minoan event(s), consisting of pyroclastic sea floor deposits, distal ash fallout and ignimbrites on the island of Santorini, is likely about 60 km^{3}, a greatly increased estimate, comparable to the largest historic explosion, Mount Tambora 1815; the increased estimate affects the size of the ensuing tsunami as it has been widely modeled.

In October 2022 it was announced that a previously undetected magma chamber had been discovered approximately 2 to 4 km below sea level in the Kolumbo underwater volcano. Scientists had determined that it is gradually filling with melt. Although an eruption is not imminent, it does pose a threat which has prompted them to recommend real-time monitoring of the volcano.

A series of earthquakes hit the neighboring island of Santorini in 2025. Subsequent studies of onshore and marine seismological data revealed a connection between the magma storage that feed Kolumbo and the Santorini volcano.

== See also ==
- Minoan eruption
- Timeline of volcanism on Earth
