= Phreatic eruption =

Volcanic eruption caused by an explosion of steam

A scheme of a phreatic eruption: 1: water-vapor cloud, 2: magma conduit, 3: layers of lava and ash, 4: stratum, 5: water table, 6: explosion, 7: magma chamber

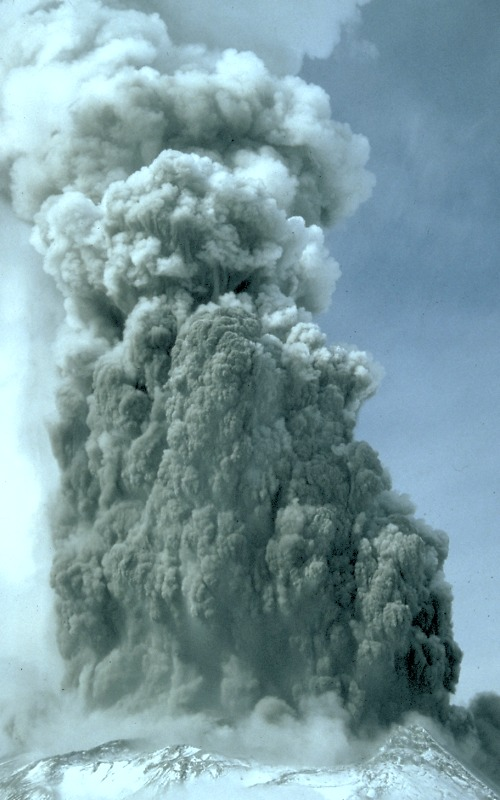
Phreatic eruption at the summit of Mount St. Helens, Washington, in the spring of 1980

A phreatic eruption, also called a phreatic explosion, ultravulcanian eruption or steam-blast eruption, occurs when magma heats ground water or surface water. The extreme temperature of the magma (anywhere from 500 to 1,170 °C (930 to 2,100 °F)) causes near-instantaneous evaporation of water to steam, resulting in an explosion of steam, water, ash, rock, and volcanic bombs. At Mount St. Helens in Washington state, hundreds of steam explosions preceded the 1980 Plinian eruption of the volcano. A less intense geothermal event may result in a mud volcano.

Phreatic eruptions typically include steam and rock fragments; the inclusion of liquid lava is unusual. The temperature of the fragments can range from cold to incandescent. If molten magma is included, volcanologists classify the event as a phreatomagmatic eruption. These eruptions occasionally create broad, low-relief craters called maars. Phreatic explosions can be accompanied by carbon dioxide or hydrogen sulfide gas-emissions. Carbon dioxide can asphyxiate at sufficient concentration; hydrogen sulfide acts as a broad-spectrum poison. A 1979 phreatic eruption on the island of Java killed 140 people, most of whom were overcome by poisonous gases.

== Examples of phreatic eruptions ==
- Cumbre Vieja – In the 2021 La Palma eruption, new eruptive vents tended to announce themselves with a phreatic explosion, followed soon after by the opening of a new fissure vent in the same location.
- Krakatoa – Indonesia, 1883 (see 1883 eruption of Krakatoa) – it is believed that the eruption, which obliterated most of the volcanic island and created the loudest sound in recorded history, was a phreatomagmatic event.
- Ritter Island – Papua New Guinea, 1888 (see 1888 Ritter Island eruption and tsunami) – Resulted in the largest lateral spreading of a volcanic cone in human history.
- Kilauea – Hawaii, United States – the volcano has a long record of phreatic explosions; a 1924 phreatic eruption hurled rocks estimated at eight tons up to a distance of one kilometer.
- Surtsey – Iceland, 1963–65
- Taal Volcano – Philippines, 1965, 1977, 2020
- Mount Ontake – Japan, 2014 (see 2014 Mount Ontake eruption)
- Mayon Volcano – Philippines, 2013
- Whakaari/White Island – New Zealand, 2019 (see 2019 Whakaari/White Island eruption)
- Mount Bulusan – Philippines, 2022

== See also ==
- Types of volcanic eruptions – Volcanic event
- Phreatic – Term used in several scientific disciplines
- Hydrothermal explosion – Explosion of superheated ground water converting to steam
- Steam cannon – Projectile launcher powered by heat and water
