= Volcanic explosivity index =

(VEI) Predictive qualitative scale for explosiveness of volcanic eruptions

VEI and ejecta volume correlation

The volcanic explosivity index (VEI) is a scale used to measure the size of explosive volcanic eruptions. It was devised by Christopher G. Newhall of the United States Geological Survey and Stephen Self in 1982.

Volume of products, eruption cloud height, and qualitative observations (using terms ranging from "gentle" to "mega-colossal") are used to determine the explosivity value. The scale is open-ended with the largest eruptions in history given a magnitude of 8. A value of 0 is given for non-explosive eruptions, defined as less than 10,000 m^{3} (350,000 cu ft) of tephra ejected; and 8 representing a supervolcanic eruption that can eject 1.0×10^{12} m^{3} (240 cubic miles) of tephra and have a cloud column height of over 20 km (66,000 ft). The scale is logarithmic, with each interval on the scale representing a tenfold increase in observed ejecta criteria, with the exception of between VEI-0, VEI-1 and VEI-2.

== Classification ==
With indices running from 0 to 8, the VEI associated with an eruption is dependent on how much volcanic material is thrown out, to what height, and how long the eruption lasts. The scale is logarithmic from VEI-2 and up; an increase of 1 index indicates an eruption that is 10 times as powerful. As such, there is a discontinuity in the definition of the VEI between indices 1 and 2. The lower border of the volume of ejecta jumps by a factor of one hundred, from 10,000 to 1,000,000 m^{3} (350,000 to 35,310,000 cu ft), while the factor is ten between all higher indices. For ejecta volumes above 0.001 km^{3}, the VEI may be calculated as

$$VEI=\lfloor log_{10}(v)\rfloor+5$$

where $v$ is the volume of ejecta in km^{3}. In the following table, the frequency of each VEI indicates the approximate frequency of new eruptions of that VEI or higher.

VEI	Ejecta volume (bulk)	Classification	Description	Plume	Periodicity	Tropospheric injection	Stratospheric injection
VEI	Ejecta volume (bulk)	Examples					
0	< 10^{4} m^{3}	Hawaiian	Effusive	< 100 m	constant	negligible	none
0	< 10^{4} m^{3}	Kīlauea, Mawson Peak (current), Fagradalsfjall (2021-2023), Mauna Loa (1975, 1984, 2022), Piton de la Fournaise (current)					
1	≥ 10^{4} m^{3}	Hawaiian / Strombolian	Gentle	100 m – 1 km	daily	minor	none
1	≥ 10^{4} m^{3}	Yakedake (1995), Dieng Volcanic Complex (1964, 1979, 2017), Havre Seamount (2012), Sundhnúkur (2023-2025)					
2	≥ 10^{6} m^{3}	Strombolian / Peléan / Vulcanian	Explosive	1–5 km	2 weeks	moderate	none
2	≥ 10^{6} m^{3}	Mount Etna, Stromboli (since 1934), Unzen (1792), Ritter Island (1888), White Island (2019), Marapi (2023)					
3	≥ 10^{7} m^{3}	Peléan / Sub-Plinian	Severe	3–15 km	3 months	substantial	possible
3	≥ 10^{7} m^{3}	Surtsey (1963-1967), Nevado del Ruiz (1985), Redoubt (1989-1990), Ontake (2014), Kanlaon (2024)					
4	≥ 0.1 km^{3}	Peléan / Vulcanian / Plinian / Sub-Plinian	Catastrophic	> 10 km	18 months	substantial	definite
4	≥ 0.1 km^{3}	Bandai (1888), Pelée (1902), Lamington (1951), Eyjafjallajökull (2010), Merapi (2010), Semeru (2021)					
5	≥ 1 km^{3}	Peléan / Plinian	Cataclysmic	> 20 km	12 years	substantial	significant
5	≥ 1 km^{3}	Vesuvius (79), Fuji (1707), Tarawera (1886), St. Helens (1980), Puyehue (2011), Hunga Tonga–Hunga Haʻapai (2022)					
6	≥ 10 km^{3}	Plinian / Ultra-Plinian	Colossal	> 30 km	50–100 years	substantial	substantial
6	≥ 10 km^{3}	Lake Ilopango (450), Paektu (946), Huaynaputina (1600), Krakatoa (1883), Santa Maria (1902), Novarupta (1912), Pinatubo (1991)					
7	≥ 100 km^{3}	Ultra-Plinian	Super-colossal	> 40 km	500–1,000 years	substantial	substantial
7	≥ 100 km^{3}	Campi Flegrei (37 kyr), Crater Lake (6000 BC ~ 4000 BC), Kuril Lake (6400 BC), Kikai (4300 BC), Taal Caldera (~4000 BC), Cerro Blanco (2300 BC), Santorini (1600 BC), Taupo (232), Samalas (1257), Tambora (1815)					
8	≥ 1,000 km^{3}	Ultra-Plinian	Mega-colossal	> 50 km	> 50,000 years	vast	vast
8	≥ 1,000 km^{3}	Wah Wah Springs (30 Mya), La Garita (26.3 Mya), Yellowstone (2.1 Mya, 640 kyr), Toba (74 kyr), Taupō (26.5 kyr)					

About 40 eruptions of VEI-8 magnitude within the last 132 million years (Mya) have been identified, of which 30 occurred in the past 36 million years. Considering the estimated frequency is on the order of once in 50,000 years, there are likely many such eruptions in the last 132 Mya that are not yet known. Based on incomplete statistics, other authors assume that at least 60 VEI-8 eruptions have been identified. The most recent is Lake Taupō's Oruanui eruption, more than 27,000 years ago, which means that there have not been any Holocene eruptions with a VEI of 8.

There have been at least 10 eruptions of VEI-7 in the last 11,700 years. There are also 58 Plinian eruptions, and 13 caldera-forming eruptions, of large, but unknown magnitudes. By 2010, the Global Volcanism Program of the Smithsonian Institution had cataloged the assignment of a VEI for 7,742 volcanic eruptions that occurred during the Holocene (the last 11,700 years) which account for about 75% of the total known eruptions during the Holocene. Of these 7,742 eruptions, about 49% have a VEI of 2 or lower, and 90% have a VEI of 3 or lower.

== Limitations ==
Under the VEI, ash, lava, lava bombs, and ignimbrite are all treated alike. Density and vesicularity (gas bubbling) of the volcanic products in question is not taken into account. In contrast, the DRE (dense-rock equivalent) is sometimes calculated to give the actual amount of magma erupted. Another weakness of the VEI is that it does not take into account the power output of an eruption, which makes the VEI extremely difficult to determine with prehistoric or unobserved eruptions.

Although VEI is quite suitable for classifying the explosive magnitude of eruptions, the index is not as significant as sulfur dioxide emissions in quantifying their atmospheric and climatic impact.

== Lists of notable eruptions ==
Clickable imagemap of notable volcanic eruptions. The apparent volume of each bubble is linearly proportional to the volume of tephra ejected, colour-coded by time of eruption as in the legend. Pink lines denote convergent boundaries, blue lines denote divergent boundaries and yellow spots denote hotspots.

- Timeline of volcanism on Earth (mostly VEI-6, within 2 kya)
- List of volcanic eruptions 1500–2000
- List of volcanic eruptions in the 21st century
- List of volcanic eruptions by death toll
- List of large Holocene volcanic eruptions (VEI-5–7)
- List of large volcanic eruptions (VEI-5–8, within 450+ Mya)
- List of largest volcanic eruptions (VEI-7–8, mostly within 500 Mya)

== See also ==
- Supervolcano – Volcano that has erupted with a volcanic explosivity index of 8
- Decade Volcanoes – Set of volcanoes considered especially dangerous
- Dispersal index – Indicator of spread of volcanic ejecta
- Lists of volcanoes
- List of natural disasters by death toll
