= Dieng Volcanic Complex =

Volcanic complex in Central Java, Indonesia

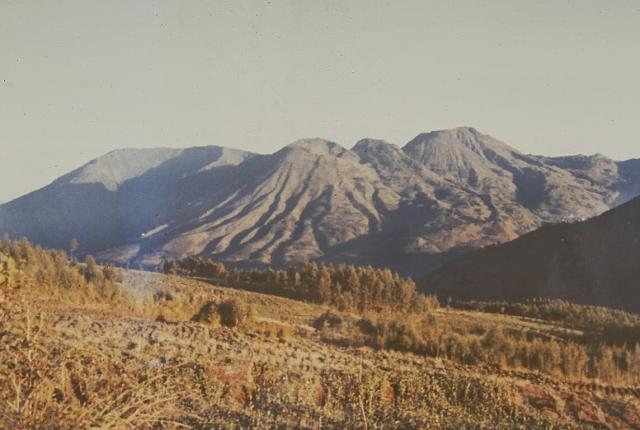

Highest point
- Elevation: 2,565 m (8,415 ft)
- Coordinates: 7.20°S 109.92°E

Geography
- Location within Java Location within Indonesia
- Location: Java, Indonesia

Geology
- Mountain type: Complex volcano
- Volcanic arc: Sunda Arc
- Last eruption: April 2021

The Dieng Volcanic Complex (Javanese: ꦢꦶꦲꦾꦁ, romanized: Dihyang) is a volcanic complex located on the Dieng Plateau in Central Java, Indonesia, a complex of volcanoes. The volcanic complex consists of two or more stratovolcanoes, more than 20 small craters, and Pleistocene to Holocene-age volcanic cones. It covers a 6 by 14 kilometres (3.7 by 8.7 mi) area. The Prahu stratovolcano was truncated by a large Pleistocene caldera and then filled by parasitic cones, lava domes, and craters which is 120 °C (248 °F). Some of them are turned into lakes. Toxic volcanic gas has caused fatalities and is a hazard at several craters. On 20 February 1979, 149 people died of gas poisoning in Pekisaran Village on the plateau near the Sinila Crater. The area is also home to a major geothermal project.

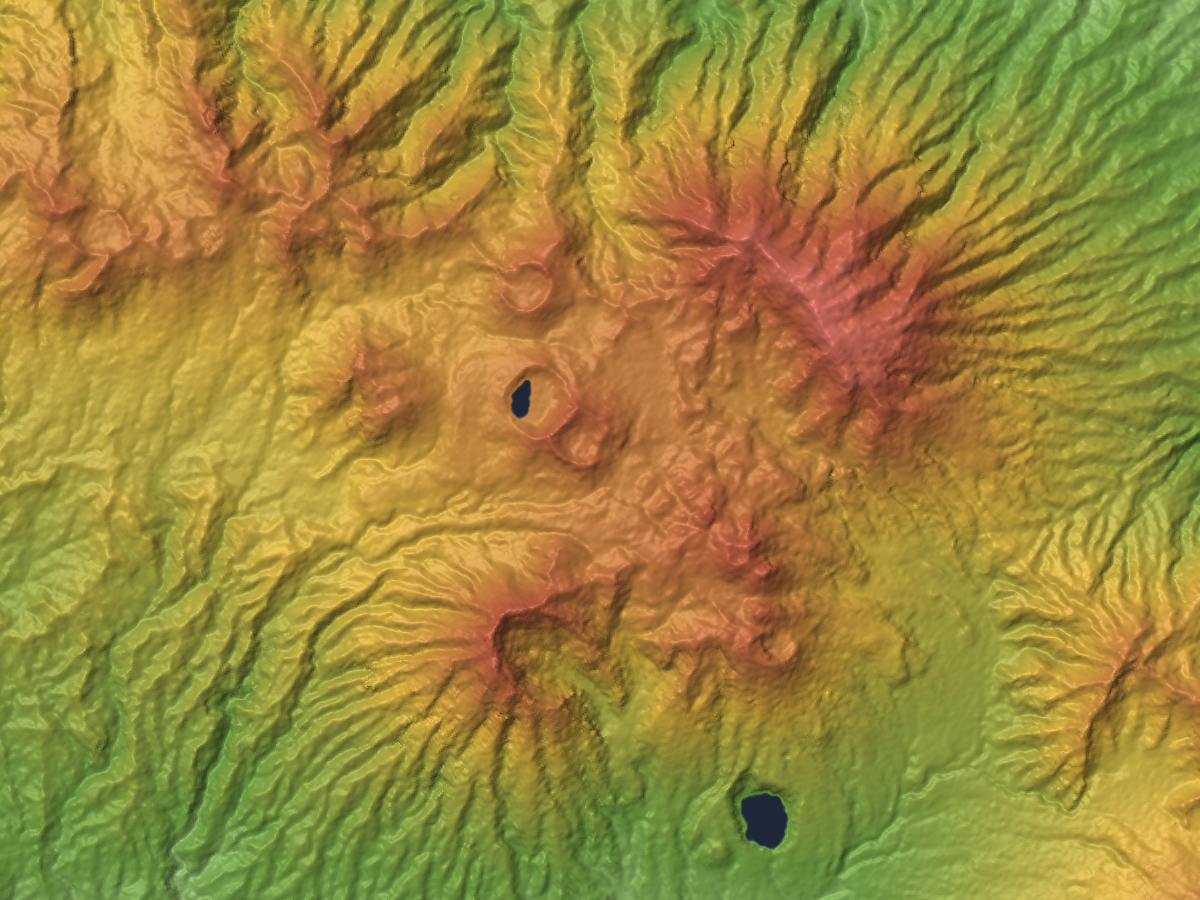
Relief Map

== See also ==
- List of volcanoes in Indonesia
- Dieng Plateau
- Dieng temples
