= Ritter Island =

Small volcanic island in Papua New Guinea

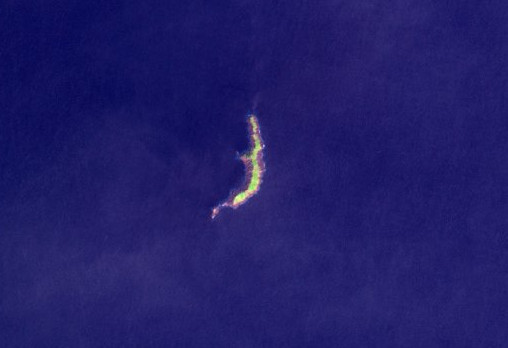
- Ritter Island in 2004

Highest point
- Elevation: 140 m (460 ft)
- Prominence: 140 m (460 ft)
- Coordinates: 5°31′S 148°07′E

Geography
- Location: Papua New Guinea

Geology
- Mountain type: Stratovolcano
- Last eruption: May 2007

Ritter Island is a small, uninhabited, crescent-shaped volcanic island 100 kilometres (62 mi) north-east of New Guinea, in the Bismarck Sea, situated between Umboi Island and Sakar Island in the Morobe Province of Papua New Guinea (PNG) and close to New Britain island.

It is one of many active volcanoes in PNG, which result from a subduction of the Solomon Sea plate beneath the South Bismarck Plate along the New Britain Trench. There were several recorded eruptions of this basaltic-andesitic stratovolcano in 1699 and 1793, prior to a spectacular lateral collapse which took place in 1888. Before that event, it was a circular conical island about 780 metres (2,560 ft) high.

== History ==
The earliest known sighting of the island by outsiders was by William Dampier, an English explorer, privateer, navigator, and naturalist. He reported that "we heard a dreadful noise like thunder, and saw a flame of fire after it, the most terrifying that ever I saw". The island is believed to have been named after the German geographer, Carl Ritter, when the area formed part of German New Guinea.

== 1888 eruption ==
At about 5:30 am local time on 13 March 1888 a large portion of the island, containing perhaps 5 km^{3} (1.2 cu mi) of material slid into the sea during a relatively minor, possibly VEI 2, phreatic eruption. Eyewitnesses at Finschhafen, 100 km (62 mi) to the south, heard explosions and observed an almost imperceptible ash fall. Tsunamis 12–15 metres (40–50 ft) high were generated by the collapse and devastated nearby islands and the adjacent New Guinea coast killing around 3,000 people.

The collapse left a 140-metre (460 ft) high, 1,900-metre (6,200 ft) long crescent-shaped island with a steep west-facing escarpment. At least two small eruptions have occurred offshore since 1888, one in 1972 and another in 1974, which have resulted in the construction of a small submarine edifice within the collapse scar.

== See also ==
- List of volcanic eruption deaths
- List of volcanoes in Papua New Guinea
