= List of volcanic eruptions in the 21st century =

- Satellite images of the 15 January 2022 eruption of Hunga Tonga–Hunga Haʻapai

This is a list of volcanic eruptions in the 21st century with a volcanic explosivity index (VEI) of 4 or higher, and smaller eruptions that resulted in fatalities, significant damage or disruptions.

The largest volcanic eruption of the 21st century is the 2022 Hunga Tonga–Hunga Haʻapai eruption and tsunami, and the deadliest are the 2018 Volcán de Fuego eruption and the 2018 Sunda Strait tsunami.

== Large eruptions (VEI of 4 or higher, or plume height of at least 15 km) ==
VEI	Volcano	Country	Year	Max plume height (km)	Material volume (km^{3})	Fatalities	Notes
?	Krakatoa	Indonesia	2026	15			
4	Hayli Gubbi	Ethiopia	2025	14			
4	Mount Lewotobi	Indonesia	2024–ongoing	18		13	On 4 November 2024, the volcano spewed molten debris at several villages some 4 km (2.5 mi) away, destroying homes and killing at least nine. The Centre of Volcanology and Geological Hazard Mitigation recommended that a 7 km (4.3 mi) radius around the volcano be evacuated. Seven villages were affected by the eruption. A larger eruption occurred on 7 November. On 8 November, the volcano erupted several times, one bearing an ash plume with a height reaching 10 km (6.2 mi). On 9 November, it erupted again, scrambling authorities to evacuate approximately 16,000 people from nearby villages. The volcano erupted twice on 7 July 2025, the first one occurring at 11:00 local time, sending a column of volcanic materials to height up to 18 km (11 mi) which was the volcano's highest since the 7 November 2024 eruption, the second eruption occurred at 19:30 local time, spewing lava and sending clouds of ash up to 13 km (8 mi), at least 24 international flights and 4 domestic flights were cancelled as a result of the eruptions on 7 July 2025.
4	Mount Ruang	Indonesia	2024	23			Thousands of homes were destroyed. Volcanic ash was reported as far away as Manado and several areas in Gorontalo. Airlines from West Malaysia and Singapore cancelled flights to Sabah and Sarawak on 18 April due to reduced visibility. The eruption also prompted the shutdown of Sam Ratulangi International Airport in North Sulawesi. All 843 residents of Ruang island were evacuated to Manado, while 12,000 residents of Tagulandang were relocated to Siau Island by ship. On 17 and 30 April, authorities raised the volcano's alert level to four, the highest in Indonesia and issued a tsunami alert which led to orders for 11,000 residents and evacuees in Tagulandang to be moved to Manado in mainland Sulawesi, citing the risk of the volcano collapsing into the sea.
4?	Sheveluch	Russia	2023	20			An eruption on 11 April ejected a cloud of volcanic gas and ash that reached a height of 20 km (12 mi) and spread over an area of 108,000 km^{2} (42,000 sq mi). Pyroclastic flows from the eruption traveled up to 19 km (12 mi) away from the volcano.
3	Bezymianny	Russia	2022	15			An eruption on 28 May sent ash to an altitude of 15 km, causing some disruptions to flights in the North Pacific, including an American Airlines flight from Dallas to Tokyo that diverted back to Los Angeles midway across the Pacific, landing after approximately 12 hours in the air.
5–6	Hunga Tonga–Hunga Ha'apai	Tonga	2022	58	6–10	6	The explosive submarine eruption began on 20 December 2021, with the largest explosion occurring on January 15, 2022. Satellite measurements recorded an eruption column of at least 30,000 m (98,000 ft) into the atmosphere. The explosion was hundreds of times more powerful than the atomic bomb dropped on Hiroshima, and was heard as far as Fairbanks, Alaska, nearly 10,000 km away. Fluctuations in air pressure were recorded all over the world as the pressure wave fully circled the world several times. Two people were killed in Peru by a 2-metre tsunami wave. A British woman was found to have been killed by the tsunami in Tonga.
4	Mount Semeru	Indonesia	2021	12		57	An eruption began on December 4, and ejected a cloud of volcanic ash 12,000 m (40,000 ft) into the air, killing at least 57 people and injuring more than 100 others.
4	Fukutoku-Okanoba	Japan	2021	16			Submarine volcano approximately 1,300 km south of Tokyo. In October, a large amount of trachytic composition pumice was seen to have been released in this eruption, and washed ashore on Okinawa and Amami Islands.
4	La Soufrière	Saint Vincent and the Grenadines	2021	16	0.3		2021 eruption of La Soufrière
4	Taal	Philippines	2020	15		39	2020 Taal Volcano eruption. A plinian eruption from the main crater spewed tephra to Calabarzon, Metro Manila, Central Luzon and Pangasinan. 39 people were killed.
4	Ulawun	Papua New Guinea	2019	19.2			On 26 June Ulawun erupted, sending an ash plume to at least 19,000 m (63,000 ft). Other large eruptions occurred on 2 August, also sending ash to 19,000 m (63,000 ft).
4	Raikoke	Russia	2019	17			First eruption since 1924. At approximately 4 am, 22 June it erupted, with a plume of ash and gas reaching between 13,000 m (43,000 ft) and 17,000 m (56,000 ft), passing the tropopause and allowing stratospheric injection of ash and sulfur dioxide.
3	Volcán de Fuego	Guatemala	2018	15		190–2,900	At least 190 people were killed in the volcano's most powerful eruption since 1974. Ash forced the closure of La Aurora International Airport in Guatemala City.
4	Volcán Wolf	Ecuador	2015	15			
4	Calbuco	Chile	2015	21	0.3–0.6		First eruption since 1972. At least 4,000 people evacuated. No casualties reported.
4	Manam	Papua New Guinea	2014–ongoing	19.8			
3	Sangeang Api	Indonesia	2014	15.2			Ash drifted SE, grounding flights between south-east Asia and Darwin, Australia.
4	Kelud	Indonesia	2014	26	0.2–0.3	7	Ash was ejected to an altitude exceeding 26 km. 7 people were killed and at least 100,000 people were evacuated. At least one commercial aircraft flew into the plume, later landing safely but incurring costly engine damage.
4	Mount Sinabung	Indonesia	2013–2019	16.8		23	Mount Sinabung's eruptions caused many pyroclastic flows, one resulting in the loss of 16 lives. An eruption on 22 May 2016, resulted in the loss of 7 lives.
4	Nabro	Eritrea	2011	18	0.47	31	2011 Nabro eruption
5	Cordón Caulle	Chile	2011–2012	14	0.75–1.3		The 2011–2012 Puyehue-Cordón Caulle eruption began on 4 June 2011, causing major flight disruptions across the southern hemisphere, including South America, South Africa, Australia and New Zealand.
4	Grímsvötn	Iceland	2011	20	0.7		2011 eruption of Grímsvötn
4	Mount Merapi	Indonesia	2010	18.3		353	2010 eruptions of Mount Merapi
4	Eyjafjallajökull	Iceland	2010	9	0.25		A series of eruptions between March and June caused the worst flight disruption over Europe since the Second World War. Over an eight-day period, an estimated 107,000 flights, representing 48% of total air traffic and 10 million passengers, were canceled. According to the IATA, The total loss to the airline industry was around $1.7 billion.
4	Sarychev Peak	Russia	2009	21	0.4		
3	Mount Redoubt	Alaska, United States	2009	20			2009 Mount Redoubt eruptive activity
4	Kasatochi	Alaska, United States	2008	13.7	0.15–0.28		
4	Chaitén	Chile	2008	30	0.5–1	1	The town of Chaitén, located about 10 km southwest of the eruption site, was blanketed with ash. About 4,000 people who lived there were evacuated by boat. One elderly person died during the evacuation efforts. On 6 May, the eruption became more forceful and generated a wider and darker gray ash plume to an estimated altitude of 30,000 m (98,400 ft) into the stratosphere. All remaining people in Chaitén were ordered to evacuate, as well as anyone within 50 km of the volcano.
4	Mount Okmok	Alaska, United States	2008	20	0.26		
4	Mount Tavurvur	Papua New Guinea	2006–2010	18			
4	Manam	Papua New Guinea	2004	24			
4	Volcán el Reventador	Ecuador	2002	17	0.37		
4	Mount Ruang	Indonesia	2002	16			

== Smaller explosive eruptions resulting in fatalities or significant damage ==
VEI	Volcano	Country	Year	Fatalities	Notes
?	Dukono	Indonesia	2026	3	May 2026 eruption of Dukono
3	Kanlaon	Philippines	2024	None	2024 Kanlaon eruption
2	Mount Marapi	Indonesia	2023	23	2023 eruption of Mount Marapi
2	Popocatépetl	Mexico	2022	1	One woman was killed and 2 other climbers were injured after being hit by hot volcanic rock during an ascent to the crater on 22 June.
2	Whakaari / White Island	New Zealand	2019	22	On 9 December a phreatic eruption launched rock and ash into the air, killing 22 of the 47 people on the island, including two who are missing and declared dead. A further twenty-five people suffered injuries, including severe burns.
2	Mount Stromboli	Italy	2019	1	A hiker was killed and several others were injured after the volcano's strongest eruption since 2002. The Italian Navy was deployed and evacuated dozens of the island's residents.
3	Krakatoa	Indonesia	2018	426	A major eruption triggered a tsunami that killed at least 420 people and injured 14,000 others. As a result of the landslide, the height of the volcano was reduced from 338 meters to 110 meters.
3	Ambae	Vanuatu	2018		During a series of eruptions, volcanic ash blackened the sky, buried crops and destroyed homes. Over the course of the year, the island's 11,000 population was forced to evacuate several times.
3	Mayon	Philippines	2018		The phreatic eruption with spewing of lava caused significant displacement, with over 90,000 people evacuated from their homes. The eruption also impacted schools and education, affecting 57 schools and 91,300 students within the 6-9 kilometer danger zones. Damage to agriculture was also reported, with an estimated 185 million PHP (approx. $3.5 million USD).
3	Mount Agung	Indonesia	2017–2019		Eruptions from 2017–2019 caused thousands to be evacuated, disrupted flights and a decline in tourism to Bali.
1	Dieng Volcanic Complex	Indonesia	2017	8	On 2 July a rescue helicopter crashed, killing all 4 crewmen and 4 rescuers on board. 11 tourists near the crater were injured.
2	Mount Etna	Italy	2017		An eruption on 16 March injured 10 people, including a BBC News television crew, after magma exploded upon contact with snow.
3	Mount Ontake	Japan	2014	63	A phreatic eruption and pyroclastic flow occurred without warning, killing 63 people. Deadliest eruption in Japan since 1902, first volcano-related deaths in Japan since 1991.
2	Gamalama	Indonesia	2011	4	
3	Pacaya	Guatemala	2010	3	On 27 May, at approximately 20:00 hours there was a strong eruption ejecting debris and ash columns up to 1,500 metres (4,900 ft) followed by several tremors. Ash rained down in many cities to the northwest of the volcano, including Guatemala City. The volcanic ash fall pelted the capital and La Aurora International Airport. The National Coordinator for Disaster Reduction (CONRED) declared a red alert for the communities near the volcano and recommended the evacuation of some of them. Noti7 reporter Anibal Archila, one of the first to cover the event, was reportedly killed by volcanic debris.
3	Jabal al-Tair	Yemen	2007	7	An eruption on the Red Sea island killed at least 7 soldiers and spewed lava and ash hundreds of metres into the air.
1	Raoul Island	Kermadec Islands, New Zealand	2006	1	An eruption on 17 March killed conservation worker Mark Kearney, who was measuring the water temperature of Green Lake.
3	Santa Ana	El Salvador	2005	2	Two farmers were killed when chunks of earth and boiling water flowed down the slopes of the volcano.
2	Mount Bromo	Indonesia	2004	2	An eruption on 8 June killed two people who had been hit by rocks from the explosion.

== Effusive eruptions ==
VEI	Volcano	Country	Year	Fatalities	Notes
1	Sundhnúkur	Iceland	2023–2025		2023–2025 Sundhnúkur eruptions
0	Mauna Loa	Hawaii, United States	2022		2022 eruption of Mauna Loa
3	Cumbre Vieja	Canary Islands, Spain	2021	1	Strombolian fissure eruption resulting in one person dead, over one billion dollars in damage and the destruction of over 2,500 buildings.
1	Mount Nyiragongo	Democratic Republic of the Congo	2021	32	Effusive eruption resulting in the destruction of 1,000 homes.
3	Kilauea	Hawaii, United States	2018		Most destructive volcanic event in the United States since the 1980 eruption of Mount St. Helens. Lava flows forced the evacuation of populated areas, destroyed over 700 homes, roads and utilities, causing at least $800 million (2018 USD) of property damage.
3	Pico do Fogo	Cape Verde	2014–2015		2014–15 Fogo eruption
0	Holuhraun	Iceland	2014-2015		2014–2015 eruption of Bárðarbunga
1	Havre Seamount	Kermadec Islands, New Zealand	2012		2012 Kermadec Islands eruption
2	Tagoro	Canary Islands, Spain	2011–2012		2011–12 El Hierro eruption
1	Mount Nyiragongo	Democratic Republic of the Congo	2002	245	Large effusive eruption. At least 15% of Goma comprising 4,500 buildings was destroyed, leaving about 120,000 people homeless.

== See also ==
- List of volcanic eruptions 1500–1999
- List of large Holocene volcanic eruptions
- List of largest volcanic eruptions
- List of natural disasters by death toll
- List of volcanic eruptions by death toll
- Lists of volcanoes
