= El Rodeo, Escuintla =

El Rodeo
- Settlement in Escuintla, Guatemala
- Location in Guatemala
- Coordinates: 14°23′26″N 90°49′53″W
- Country: Guatemala
- Department: Escuintla
- Municipality: Escuintla

Population (2002)
  - Total: 14,125

El Rodeo is a town in the Escuintla Department of Guatemala, about 35 kilometers southwest of Guatemala City. It is located at an altitude of 2,483 m (8,146 ft) above sea level on the southern slopes of an active volcano called Volcán de Fuego — Spanish for Volcano of Fire.

== History ==
The town, with a population estimated at 14,125 was reported to have been buried by volcanic material following the 2018 Volcán de Fuego eruption on 3 June 2018. The town was in the early process of evacuation when the eruption happened.

Other nearby towns also covered by the superheated pyroclastic flow include San Miguel Los Lotes, and Alotenango. At least 109 people were confirmed dead, and about 192 people are reported missing.
