= 2021 Semeru eruption =

Volcanic eruption in Indonesia

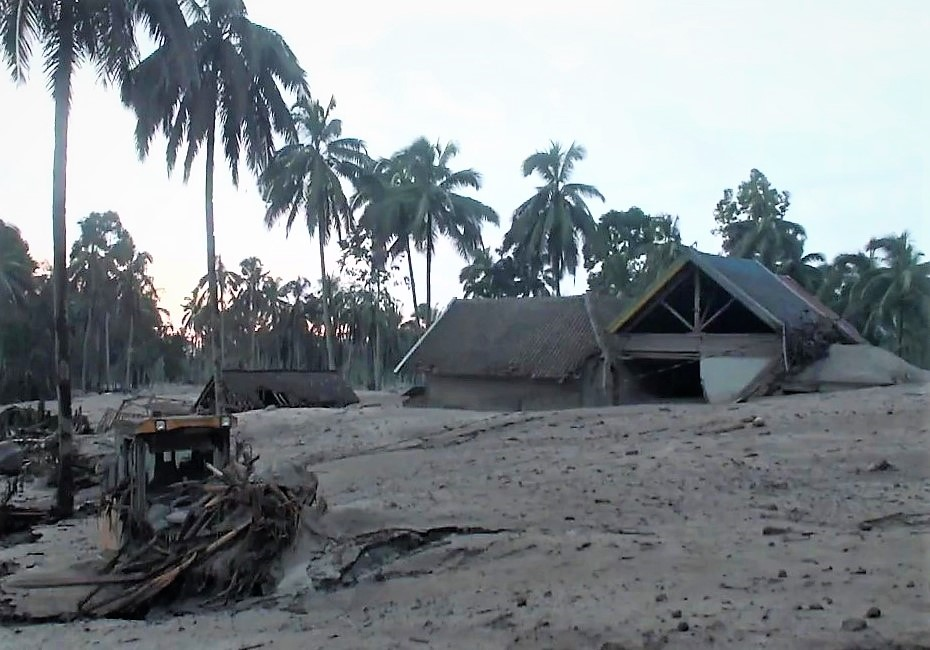
- A village partially buried by volcanic ash.
- Volcano: Semeru
- Start date: 4 December 2021
- End date: 6 December 2021
- Location: East Java, Java, Indonesia; 08°06′28″S 112°55′19″E
- VEI: 4
- Deaths: 69 dead, 104 injured, >5 missing, 10,655 displaced

Maps
- Semeru location in East Java Province

An eruption of Mount Semeru, a volcano in East Java province of the Indonesian island of Java, began on 4 December 2021. The eruption began after heavy precipitation caused the collapse of the lava dome at the summit. Pyroclastic flows and lahars damaged at least 5,205 homes and several public buildings. At least 69 people died, 104 more were injured, while more than five remain missing.

== Background ==
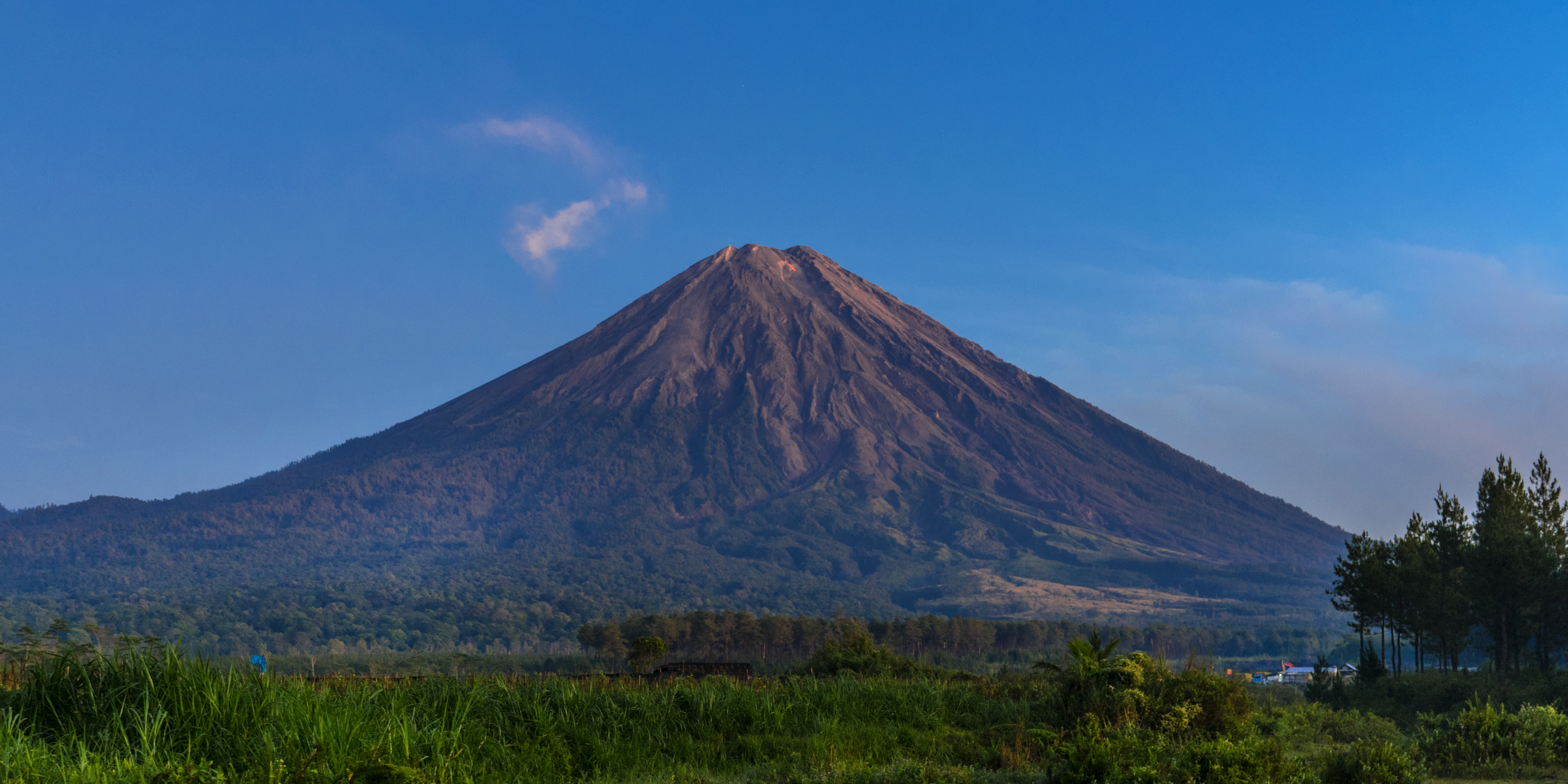
Semeru in May 2021

Semeru is one of more than 100 active volcanoes in Indonesia. At 3,676 meters in elevation, it is the highest volcano on the island. The volcano is part of a chain of volcanic mountains stretching from northern Sumatra to the Lesser Sunda Islands. Volcanism in Indonesia is mainly associated with the offshore subduction of the Australian Plate beneath the Sunda Plate. The oldest record of an eruption was from 1818. Since then, major eruptions have occurred in 1941, 1942, 1945, 1946, 1947, 1950, 1951, 1952, 1953, 1954, 1955–1957, 1958, 1959, 1960, 1977, and 1978–1989. A minor eruption occurred in January 2021 with no casualties reported. The 4 December eruption was the latest in a series of explosive eruptions on the volcano since 2014. Recent eruptions on the volcano have been accompanied by pyroclastic flows, eruption columns, and debris avalanches.

=== Past events ===
Semeru's deadliest eruption occurred on 29 August 1909 when pyroclastic flows and lava destroyed 38 settlements and 600-800 hectares of farmland. That eruption claimed 208 lives. Since then, most of the volcano's eruptive activity have been confined to minor strombolian eruptions. An eruption in 1994 caused the deaths of three people.

In May 1981, heavy rains caused the crater lake at the summit of the volcano to overflow, triggering a flash flood. Approximately 26 villages in six sub-districts were severely impacted by the floods. The official death toll from the floods totaled 251 according to government statistics. A further 120 people were lost and 152 were injured.

== Eruption ==
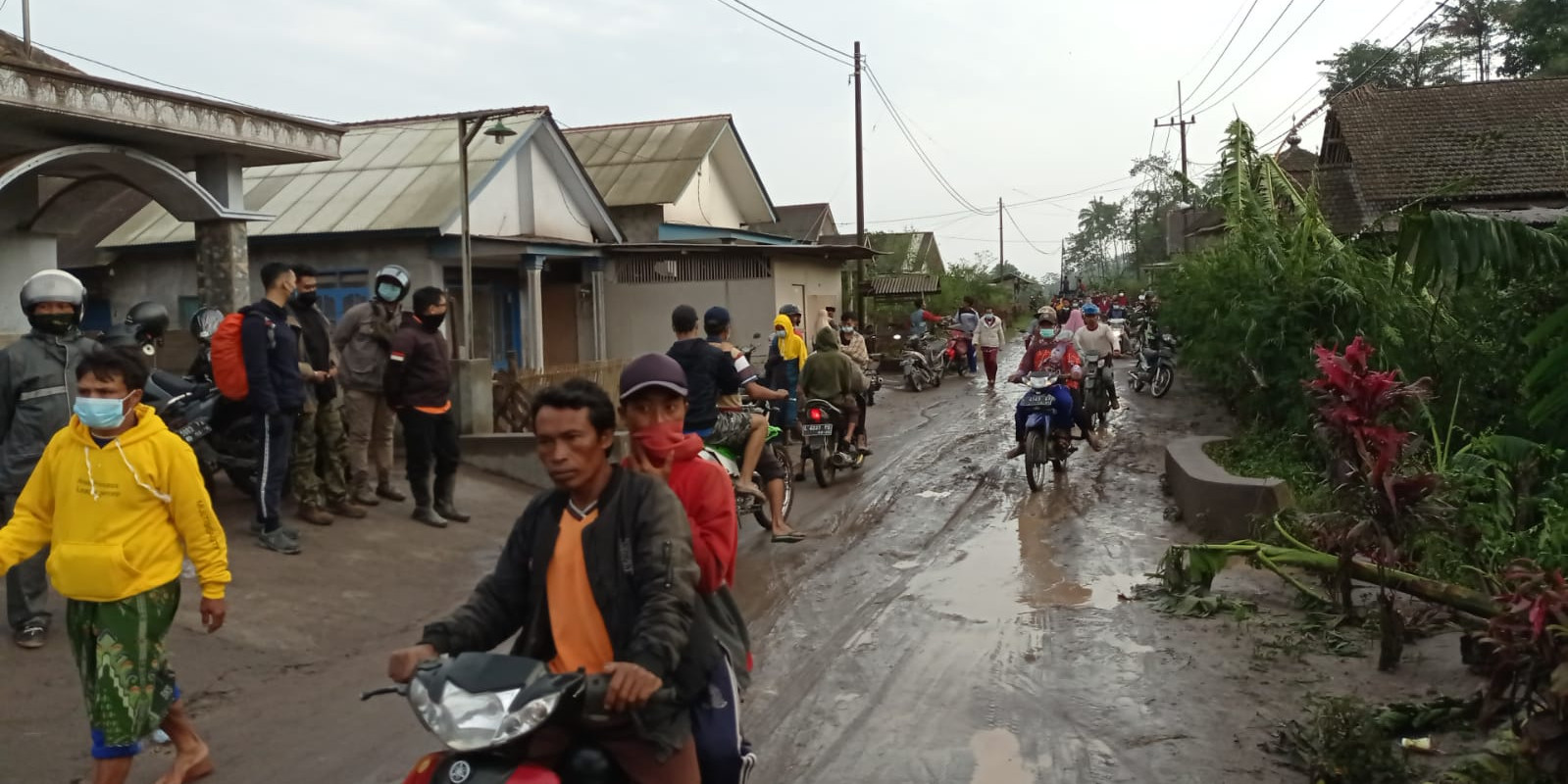
Villagers in Lumajang evacuating to a safe distance from the volcano.

The eruption was thought to have begun when a lava dome at the summit crater collapsed due to intense precipitation. A volcanologist at the Bandung Institute of Technology said the eruption debris flow was an accumulation of material from past eruptions. Heavy rainfall eroded volcanic material on the summit, destabilizing the lava dome. The collapsed dome triggered a series of pyroclastic flows that traveled down the slopes of the volcano. According to a report from the geological department of the Ministry of Energy and Mineral Resources, the plume height may have been as great as 45 km, although there are claims the height was only 11 km. Investigations are ongoing to determine the plume height. Between 5 and 9 December, eight pyroclastic flows traveled 3 km or more from the peak. The flows traveled in a southeast direction.

=== Timeline ===
Date	Description
4 December	The eruption began at 14:50 local time, ejecting a cloud of volcanic ash 40,000 feet (12,000 m) into the air. The collapse of the unstable lava dome due to heavy rainfall has been suggested as a proximate cause. Three smaller eruptions followed within a 24-hour period after the large initial eruption.
5 December	At least two pyroclasitc flows occurred at 05:13 and 10:00 local time. These flows were much smaller than the ones on 4 December, hence did not travel far from the crater.
6 December	A smaller eruption occurred on the morning, at 07:18 local time. The eruption triggered pyroclastic flows and lava flows that travelled 2.5 km down the summit. Rescuers were forced to suspend their missions due to the continued episodes of eruptions.
7 December	At 01:14 local time, an eruption column was observed climbing at least 1,000 meters above the summit. The second and third eruption occurred at 02:44 and 05:54 respectively, reaching a similar height of 1,000 meters.
8 December	At 00:01 local time Mount Semeru erupted with the height of the ash column observed reaching 500 meters above the summit.
9 December	Smoke was seen rising several hundred meters above the summit vent.
10 December	Semeru produced one eruption and two pyroclastic flows.
11 December	Earthquakes and several pyroclastic flows were reported. Smoke was seen rising 500-1,000 meters above the crater.
16 December	Recovery missions were suddenly interrupted when pyroclastic flows traveled 4.5 km towards Besuk Kobokan.
19 December	The volcano erupted a second time early in the morning, sending a column of ash 2 km high in the air.
20 December	Semeru generated an eruption column rising 1.5 km above the summit crater. The alert level of the volcano was also raised to level III.
31 December	A pyroclastic flow traveled 4 km from the summit crater down to the base in the southeast.

=== Early warnings ===
According to the Center of Volcanology and Geological Hazard Mitigation (PVMBG), warnings for a potential eruption were sent to a WhatsApp group chat four days prior to the eruption on 1 December. Warnings were also issued to people on 2 December advising not to approach the crater. Villagers however, said they did not receive any early warning for a large eruption. They added that the PVMBG did not issue any alerts or inform them for such an eruption. The PVMBG received heavy criticism by residents and on social media for their poor management and failure to inform residents of the eruption. The evacuation system in place at the villages also did not function; pyroclastic flows and ash also approached and covered an evacuation center.

== Casualties ==
A total of 69 people died and more than five remain missing.

=== 4 December ===
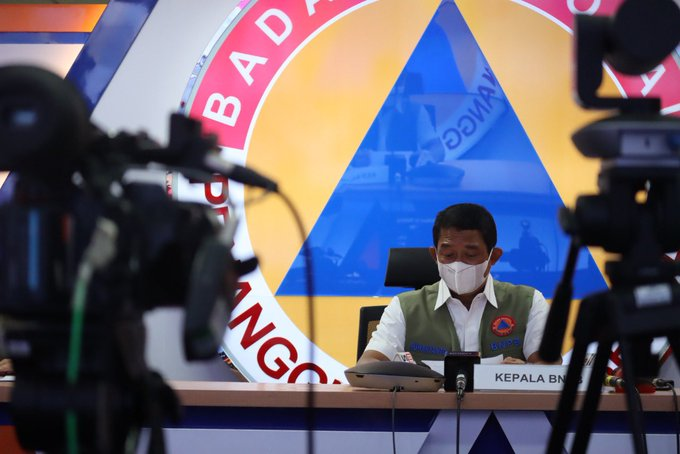
Head of BNPB, Suharyanto, holds press conference on the situation near Mount Semeru following the volcano's major eruption

Initial reports confirmed three people, a store owner and two miners, were missing when the Gladak Perak Bridge in Lumajang collapsed due to a lahar. Later in the evening, that number was revised to nine. According to the Indonesian Ministry of Health, one person was killed and 45 people were injured. More than 40 people were seriously wounded by pyroclastic flows, with four burn victims taken to the intensive care unit for their severe injuries. A total of 38 people were treated at the Penanggal Health Center. Another 10 miners at a sand mine in Renteng Village were trapped and an initial attempt to rescue the miners was unsuccessful. However, the Indonesian National Board for Disaster Management (BNPB) said that ten miners thought to be missing at a sand mine in Lumajang were rescued, with some others still unaccounted for.

=== 5 December ===
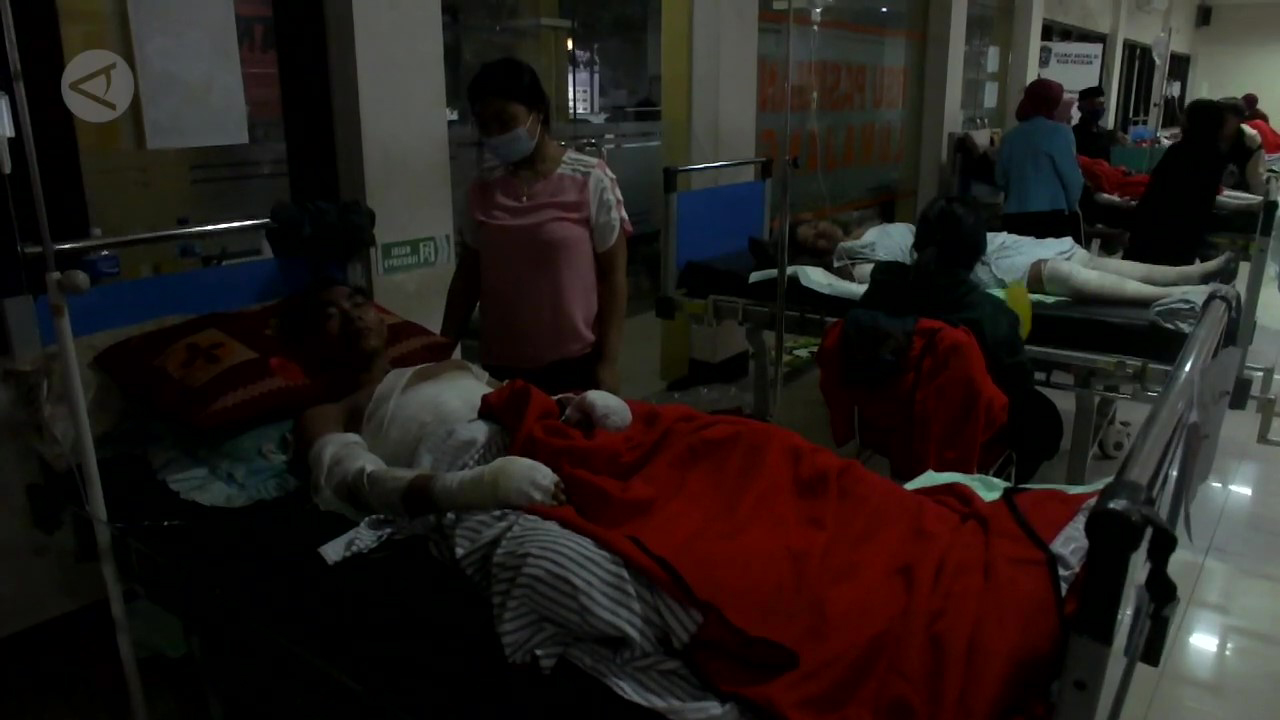
Burn victims being treated at the Pasirian Hospital in Lumajang.

A second death was confirmed in the morning at Dr. Haryoto Hospital due to severe burns. The total death toll was later revised to 14; 11 in Pronojiwo subdistrict and three in Candipuro subdistrict. Most of the fatalities succumbed to burns. Two of the fatalities were from Supiturang and Sumberwuluh villages respectively. Five other victims were from Curah Kobokan village. Five bodies are undergoing the identification process at Bhayangkara Hospital. The number of burn victims was also updated to 89 from the early morning figure of 57.

=== 6 December ===
The BNPB released an update stating that 15 people have died from the eruption while the number of missing individuals have risen to 27. Local news sources in the evening reported at least 22 fatalities, adding that only five bodies remained unidentified. The BNPB later confirmed the death toll. Fourteen of the victims were from Pronojiwo sub-district while eight others from Candipuro sub-district. According to an official from the BNPB, eight bodies from Pronojiwo had been buried.

=== 7 December ===
Officials raised the death toll in Lumajang to 34, ten of whom were unidentified. The number of unaccounted residents fell from 27 to 22 while the number of injured was updated to 169. One hospitalized victim also succumbed to his injuries. Livestock consisting of at least 138 goats and 23 cows were also lost.

=== 8 December ===
In the morning, three bodies were discovered in the cabin of a truck. The ten previously unidentified bodies were successfully identified through autopsies and forensic dentistry. The ten victims consisted of 6 males and 4 females between the ages of 15 and 70. Five bodies were returned to families of the victims through visual identification. At the Dr Haryoto Hospital, a cooler container was sent to store additional bodies due to overcapacity. A volunteer at the hospital said bodies undergoing the decomposition process would be moved into the container.

By night, officials had raised the death toll to 39.

=== 9 December ===
Four bodies were discovered during search and rescue operations, bringing the total number of victims to 43. The BNPB also updated the number of injured to 104, while at least 13 are missing. Twenty-three bodies were successfully identified by a victims identification unit.

=== 10 December ===
Recovery teams found the body of a headless person at a sand mine in Sumberwuluh, Lumajang. The body was taken to Haryoto Hospital. The Deputy Regent of Lumajang said the identification of bodies through fingerprints were impossible due to the severe injuries endured. Other methods of identification were carried out by the forensic team.

By the evening, three bodies were found, bringing the total number of fatalities to 46. In addition, at least nine people were still unaccounted. The total number of displaced individuals across 126 locations also rose to 6,573.

=== 11 December ===
The victim identification team identified four bodies, bringing the total number of identified bodies since Tuesday to 27.

=== 16 December ===
Officials recovered five human body parts in the affected area. The death toll and unaccounted was raised to 48 and 23 respectively. A total of 10,655 residents were displaced during the evacuation.

=== 18 December ===
Officials updated the death toll to 57; with 48 of the victims found at the eruption site while another nine people died during hospitalization.

=== 2022 ===
A lahar swept away two people from the village of Bades, along with several buffalo.

On 4 August, the skeletal remains of a victim were found by sand miners in Sumberwuluh village. Officials confirmed that 68 bodies were found, and more victims are possibly trapped in volcanic debris. On 11 September, the remains of a sand miner were found at Sumberwuluh. At least five people remained missing.

== Impact ==
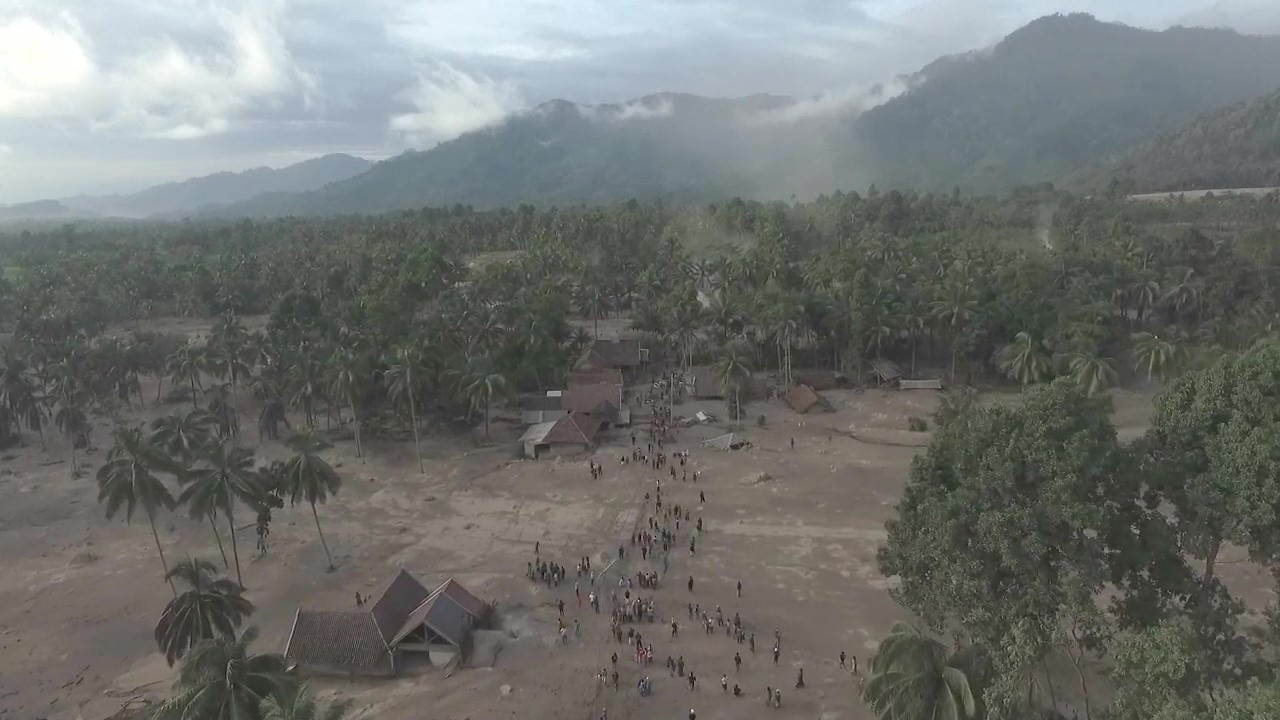
A village covered by volcanic ash.

In Malang Regency, six sub districts were affected by ashfall. Eight villages and two sub districts in Lumajang Regency were also affected. The destruction of the Gladak Perak Bridge blocked vehicle access to villages in the area. Power interruptions and blackouts were triggered, affecting at least 30,253 people. In Pronojiwo District, at least 30 homes were destroyed by lahars. Many village homes and vehicles in East Java were covered by heavy volcanic ash. An estimated 300 families were evacuated.

On 5 December, volcanic ash fell in Pronojiwo District of Lumajang, forcing many evacuees, residents and aid officials to flee. It was reported that a smaller eruption had occurred. The small eruption caused panic at nearby villages. A total of 2,970 homes and 13 public infrastructure including bridges and places of worship were damaged. Some 28 schools in two districts; six in Candipuro and 22 in Pronojiwo were heavily damaged by ashfall. At least 11 villages in Lumajang were submerged in ash reaching up the roofs of homes. Many vehicles were also submerged. Kampung Renteng, a village in Candipuro District, heavily affected by ash. At another village, ash destroyed every home.

At least 5,025 people were affected (as of 5 December), with 2,004 residents in Lumajang displaced. The displaced residents took refuge in multiple locations. In Pronojiwo District, some 305 people resided in schools and village halls. 409 people were displaced in Candipuro District, and 188 in Pasirian. Some of the evacuees later moved to other homes or buildings. Operations at Yogyakarta International Airport, Adisumarmo International Airport and Abdul Rachman Saleh Airport were unaffected by the eruption as no volcanic ash was observed. Tourism at the nearby Mount Bromo was not affected by the eruption as well. Despite Semeru located within the national park compound, visitors continued to enter the park. Access to Semeru was restricted since July 2021.

According to the Amil Zakat National Agency, the eruption caused 310 billion Rupiah worth of damage to homes, public infrastructures, local businesses, and basic services. By the afternoon of 7 December, the number of displaced individuals rose to 3,697. Most of the displaced residents were from Lumajang Regency, while 24 originated from Malang Regency. The number of displaced people rose to 4,250 by nightfall.

Officials at the emergency response post updated the number of homes damaged to 5,205. The eruption affected a total of 17 settlements in 10 sub-districts. In Kampung Renteng village, all but one home was damaged.

As of 16 December 10,655 people across 121 locations were displaced. Many of the affected, at least 2,331, were from Candipuro. In Pasirian, there was a total of 1,307 people displaced. Several hundred residents were also displaced in Pronojiwo, Tempeh, and Sukodono. At least 2,990 goats, sheep, cattle and other livestock were killed as well. Thirty-one public infrastructures were damaged.

== Response ==
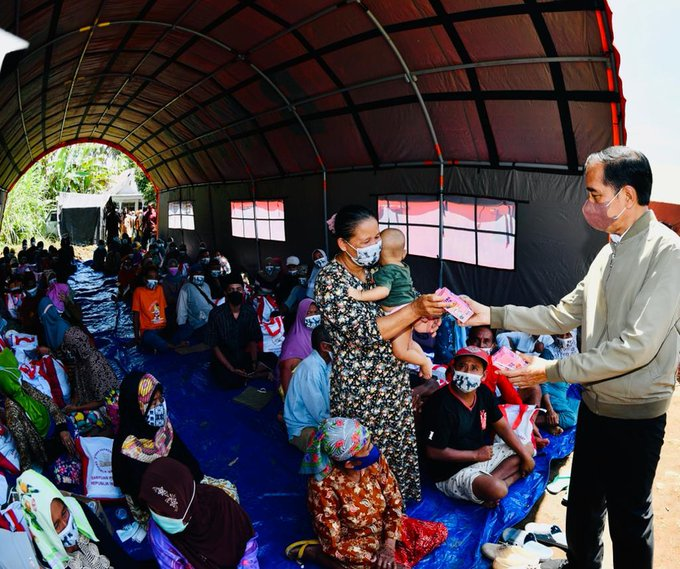
Joko Widodo visits evacuees of the 2021 Mount Semeru eruption

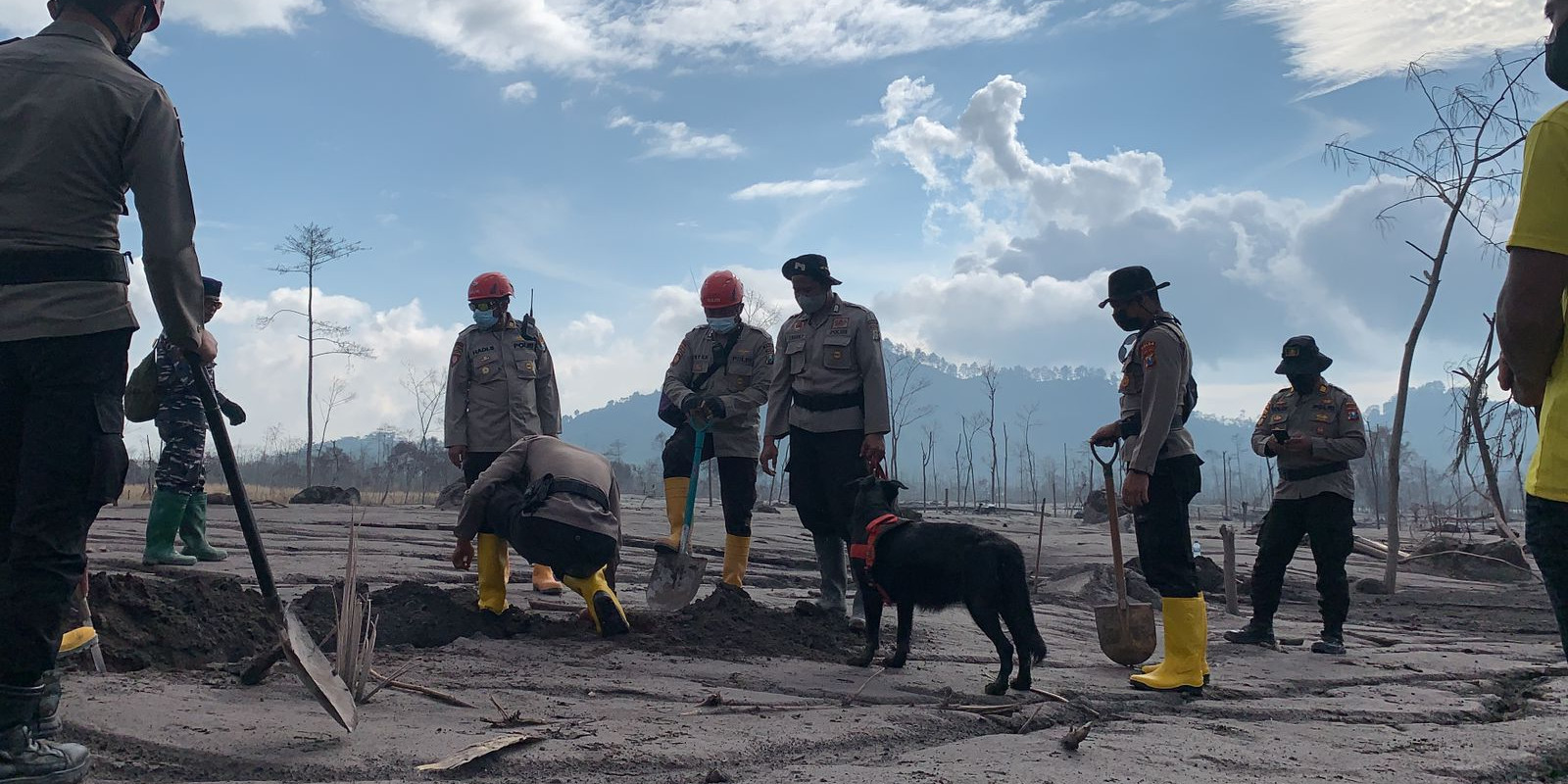
Recovery efforts of the victims of the eruption

Local authorities urged residents to keep a distance of at least 5 km away from the main summit crater as there were concerns of large pyroclastic flows. Individuals were prohibited from approaching 1 km or closer to the crater. The head of the BNPB warned of increased volcanic activity and the presence of pyroclastic flows in the volcano. He also said ashfall was occurring in some villages and urged residents to evacuate. Residents were also told to keep clear from rivers originating from Semeru as they were transporting volcanic debris. The Meteorology, Climatology, and Geophysical Agency (BMKG) issued a two-day weather forecast on 6 December warning residents of heavy rain that could trigger more lahars. The agency added that East Java had entered the rainy season where the threat of lahars are higher.

The BNPB provided meals ready-to-eat packs, blankets, mattresses, masks and refugee tents to assist the displaced residents. Medical supplies, water and instant food were also supplied. It was estimated that 1,14 billion Indonesian rupiah was utilised in providing aid. The BNPB also provided 500,000 rupiahs over a period of six months to displaced residents to pay for temporary housing, during which the construction of new homes for the affected residents took place.

Indonesian President Joko Widodo would visit the Lumajang Regency to lead the BNPB in the post-eruption recovery efforts on 5 December. Meanwhile, Khofifah Indar Parawansa, the Governor of East Java, relocated her office to the Lumajang Regency to aid in the evacuation process of residents in the danger zone. In an attempt to prevent further casualties, the Ministry of Energy and Mineral Resources suspended all mining-related operations in the immediate danger zone. The BNPB said that the response to the disaster would continue until 3 January 2022.

The Ministry of Agriculture will provide farmers seeds and beans for an area of 847 hectares. Also provided are 174 cows and goats, animal feed, grass, and medication. Tractors and hand sprayers would also be given as compensation.

=== Rescue and recovery ===
A rescue operation to locate several miners unaccounted for on the afternoon of the eruption was planned to begin once activity on the volcano has decreased. The Deputy Regent of Lumajang said that rescue and recovery efforts could not be carried out the night before due to difficult access to the affected areas.

Recovery efforts to find victims were hampered after rescuers encountered soil that was still too hot to enter. The effort to recover missing victims took approximately a week, according to search and rescue members. Superheated soil and wet conditions slowed progress of recovery.

=== Reconstructions ===
President Joko Widodo announced plans to relocate over 2,000 properties in Lumajang, and rebuilding other many affected infrastructure, including the main bridge connecting Lumajang Regency to other cities. He added that the relocation would take place after recovery efforts were complete in order to prioritize searching for missing people and treating the injured. The Indonesian government said it was looking into new locations to resettle displaced residents.

Separately, Muhadjir Effendy, the Coordinating Minister for Human Development and Cultural Affairs of Indonesia said that he was searching for possibilities to connect Lumajang and Malang after the eruption severed the Gladak Perak Bridge.

== Gallery ==
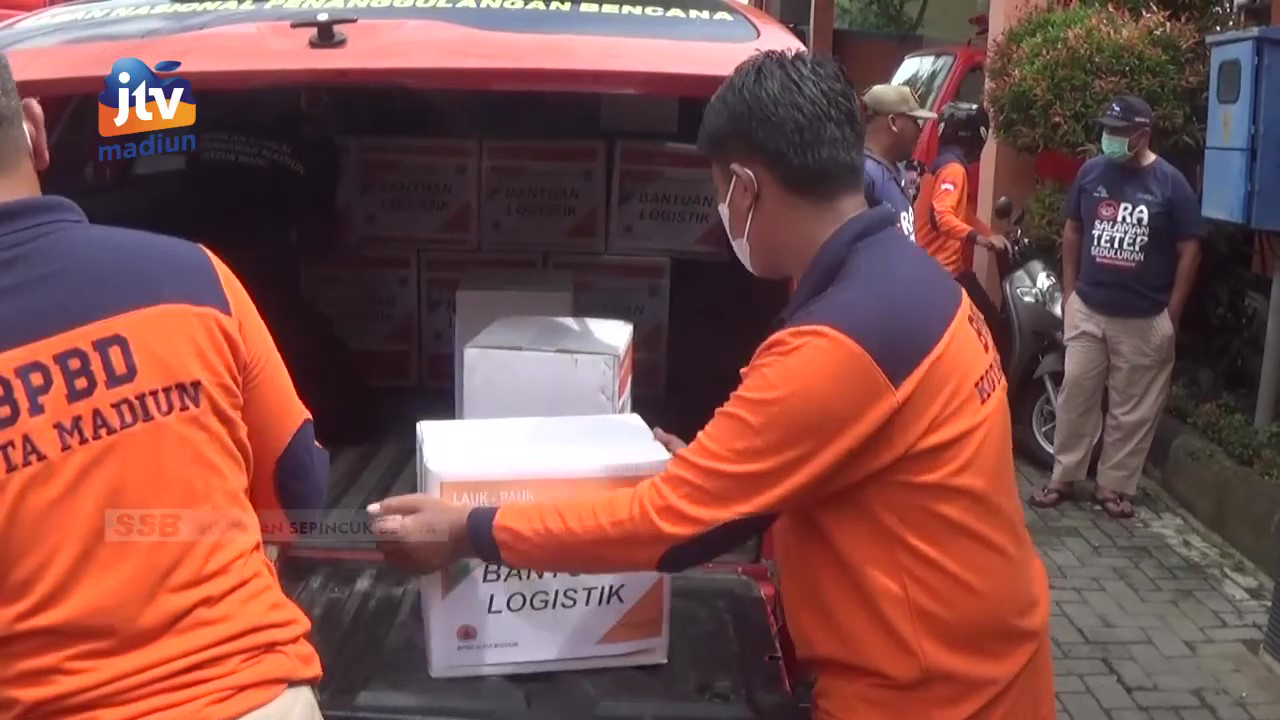
BNPB preparing to distribute logistical supplies for the refugees.

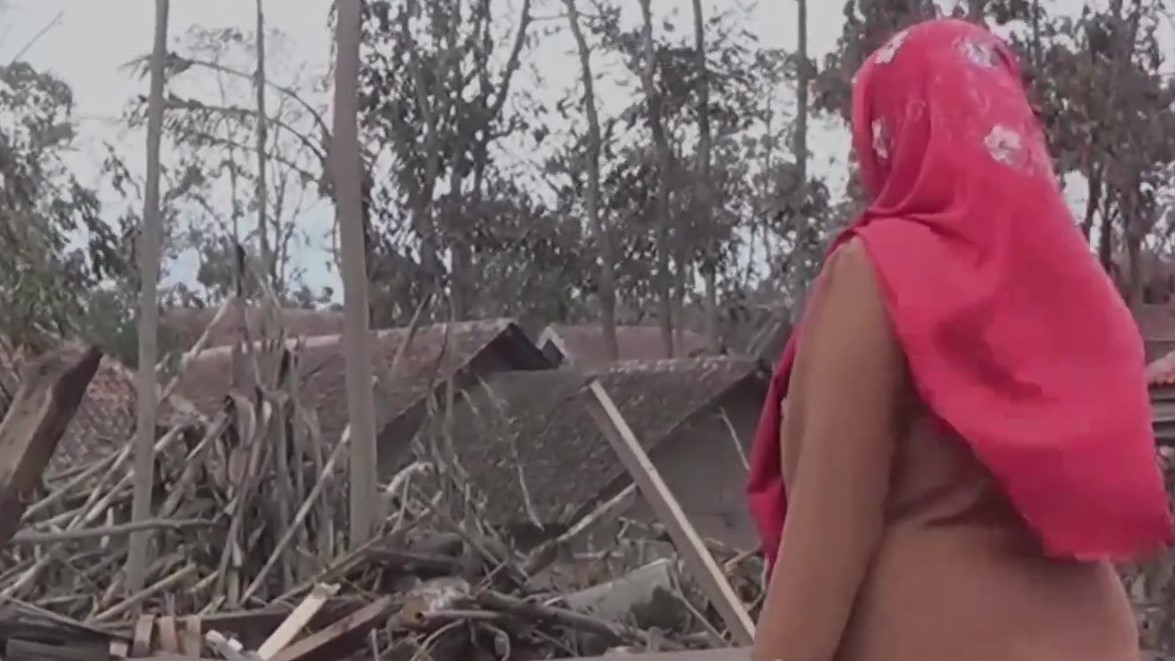
A villager staring at her house that was destroyed by the eruption.

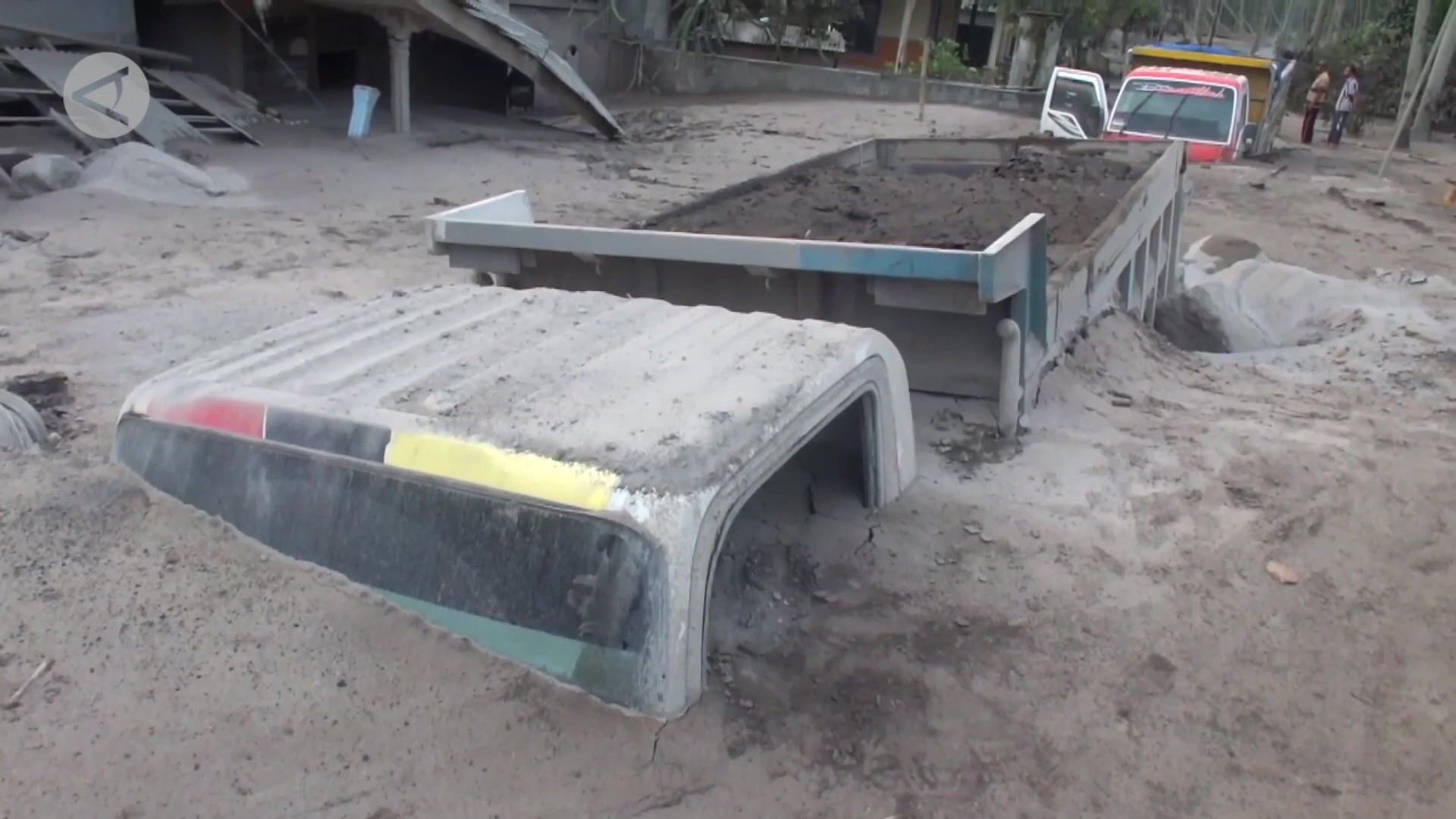
A truck partially submerged in lahar.

== See also ==
- 2020–2022 Taal Volcano eruptions – Volcanic eruptions in the Philippines
- 2018 Volcán de Fuego eruption
- 2021–22 Hunga Tonga–Hunga Haʻapai eruption and tsunami, a larger eruption that began the same month
- List of volcanic eruptions by death toll
- List of large volcanic eruptions in the 21st century
