= Volcán de Fuego =

Volcano in Guatemala

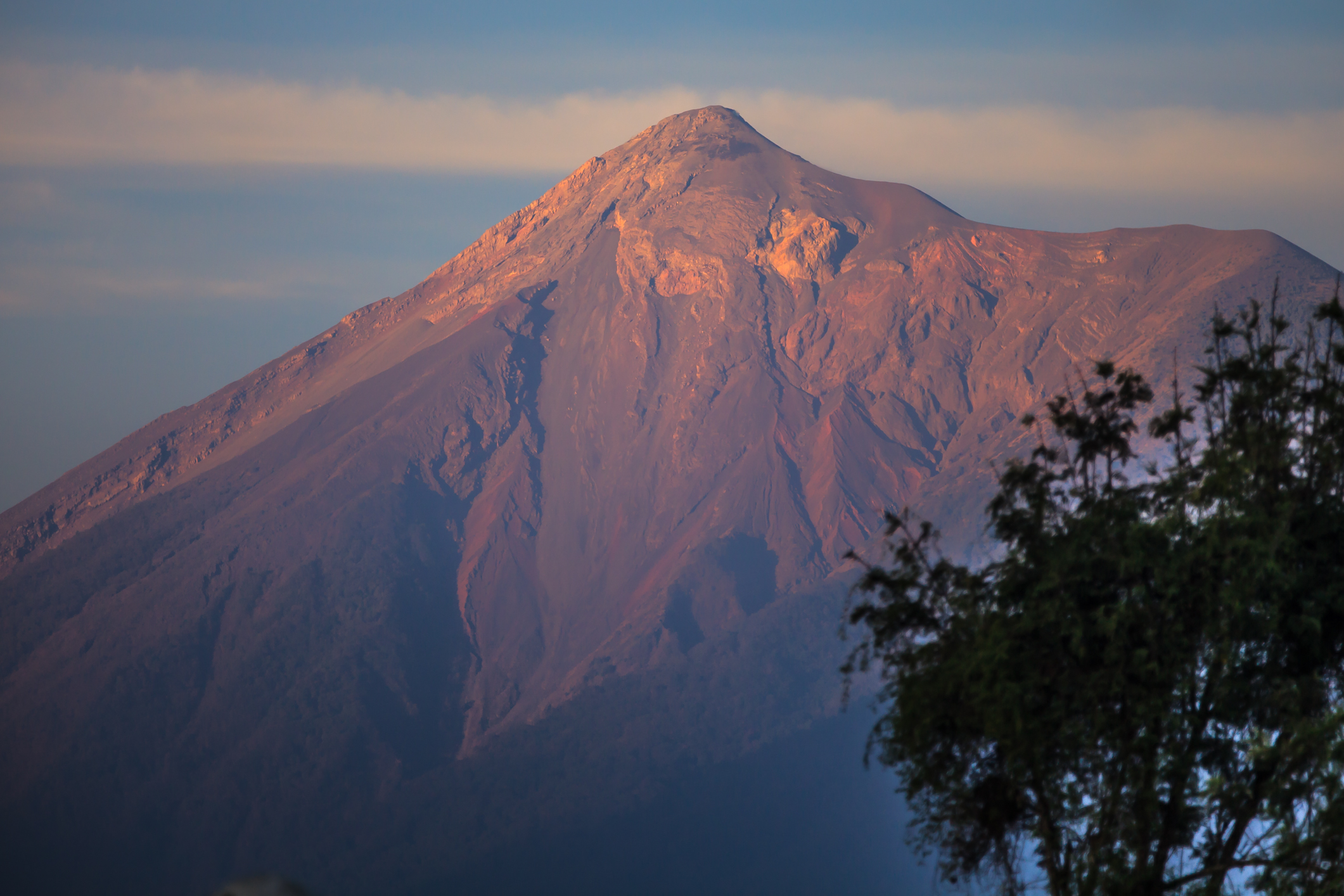
- Volcán de Fuego in 2012

Highest point
- Elevation: 3,768 m (12,362 ft)
- Prominence: 469 m (1,539 ft)
- Coordinates: 14°28′29″N 90°52′51″W

Naming
- English translation: Volcano of Fire
- Language of name: Spanish

Geography
- Location within Guatemala
- Location: Location in Guatemala
- Parent range: Sierra Madre

Geology
- Rock age: 200 kyr
- Mountain type: Stratovolcano
- Volcanic arc: Central America Volcanic Arc
- Last eruption: 4 August, 2026 (ongoing)

Climbing
- Easiest route: Fuego volcano

Volcán de Fuego (Spanish pronunciation: [bolˈkan de ˈfweɣo]; Spanish for "Volcano of Fire", often shortened to Fuego) or Chi Q'aq' (Kaqchikel for "where the fire is") is an active stratovolcano in Guatemala. Fuego lies on the borders of Chimaltenango, Escuintla and Sacatepéquez departments. Part of the mountain range of the Sierra Madre, the volcano sits about 16 kilometres (9.9 mi) west of Antigua, one of Guatemala's most famous cities and a tourist destination.

Fuego is famous for being almost constantly active. Small explosions of gas, ash, and ballistics emerge from its summit crater every 15 to 20 minutes, but larger eruptions are less frequent. Fuego's current eruptive period began with an eruption on 21 May 1999, after around 20 years of quiescence. Since 1999, Fuego has had over 80 larger eruptions - called "paroxysmal eruptions" or "paroxysms". Fuego's paroxysms produce large volumes of volcanic ash, gas, and ballistics, fire fountains, lava flows, and often pyroclastic flows. Its rock types are primarily basalt and basaltic andesite. Fuego's most recent eruptions include June and November 2018, 23 September 2021, 11 December 2022, 4 May 2023, 4 June 2025 and 4 August 2026.. The 3 June 2018 eruption caused a disaster and a national tragedy when pyroclastic flows from the eruption destroyed the Las Lajas bridge and engulfed the town of San Miguel Los Lotes, killing hundreds of people.

Fuego is monitored by INSIVUMEH, Guatemala's national scientific monitoring agency, who release daily bulletins of its eruptive activity and | special bulletins when Fuego is more active. CONRED, Guatemala's national disaster prevention agency, are responsible for assessing information on Fuego provided by INSIVUMEH and for coordinating response to Fuego's eruptive crises.

== Geology ==
Fuego is joined with Acatenango volcano to its north and collectively the complex is known as La Horqueta. Between Fuego and Acatenango is La Meseta, a scarp marking the remains of an older volcano that collapsed around 8,500 years ago. Fuego volcano started to grow after the collapse of La Meseta.

== Geography ==
The following table synthesizes the geomorphological sectors, primary drainage ravines (barrancas), and associated volcanic hazards across the slopes of Volcán de Fuego:

Geomorphological, Drainage, and Volcanic Hazard Profile of Volcán de Fuego
Sector / Flank	Elevation & Prominence	Dominant Drainage Ravines (Barrancas)	Primary Volcanic Products	Geologic Hazard & Impact Zone
Active Summit Crater	3,763 m (12,346 ft)	Upper headwaters of Las Lajas, Ceniza, Seca, and El Jute	Explosive ash plumes, ballistic blocks, and incandescent lava fountains	Direct impact zone for high-velocity volcanic projectiles and toxic gas emanation.
Eastern & Southeastern Flanks	1,200–2,800 m	Barranca Las Lajas and Barranca Honda	High-density pyroclastic density currents (PDCs) and hot lahars	Extreme vulnerability to fast-moving pyroclastic flows impacting Escuintla and Sacatepéquez corridors.
Western & Southwestern Flanks	1,400–3,000 m	Barranca Ceniza, Barranca Seca, and Achiguate tributaries	Viscous andesite-basalt lava flows, heavy ashfall, and rainfall-triggered lahares	Recurrent hydrogeological hazard for agricultural communities in Chimaltenango and Escuintla.

== Notable eruptions ==
=== 1717 destruction of Santiago de los Caballeros (Antigua) ===
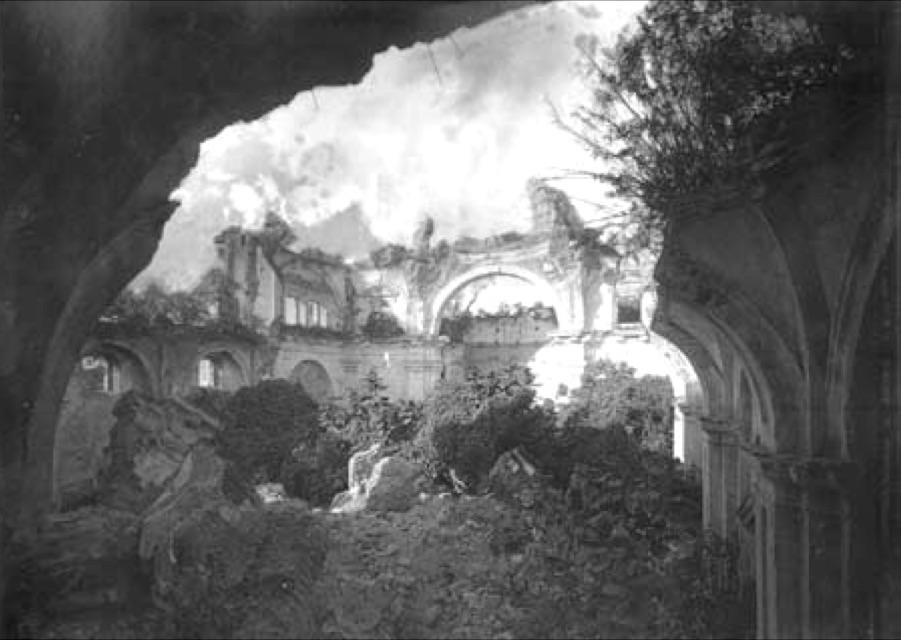
Ruins of the Society of Jesus church interior in 1880.

The strongest earthquakes experienced by the city of Santiago de los Caballeros before its final move in 1776 were the San Miguel earthquakes in 1717. In the city, people also believed that the proximity of the Volcán de Fuego (English: Volcano of Fire) was the cause of earthquakes; the great architect Diego de Porres even said that all the earthquakes were caused by volcano explosions.

On 27 August there was a strong eruption of Volcán de Fuego, which lasted until 30 August; the residents of the city asked for help to Santo Cristo of the cathedral and to the Virgen del Socorro who were sworn patrons of the Volcan de Fuego. On 29 August a Virgen del Rosario procession took to the streets after a century without leaving her temple, and there were many more holy processions until 29 September, the day of San Miguel. Early afternoon earthquakes were minor, but at about 7:00 pm there was a strong earthquake that forced residents to leave their homes; tremors and rumblings followed until four o'clock. The neighbors took to the streets and loudly confessed their sins, bracing for the worst.

The San Miguel earthquake damaged the city considerably, to the point that some rooms and walls of the Royal Palace were destroyed. There was also a partial abandonment of the city, food shortages, lack of manpower and extensive damage to the city infrastructure; not to mention numerous dead and injured. These earthquakes made the authorities consider moving to a new city less prone to seismic activity. City residents strongly opposed the move, and even took to the Royal Palace in protest; in the end, the city did not move, but the number of elements in the Army Battalion to safeguard the order was considerable. The damage to the palace was repaired by Diego de Porres, who finished repairs in 1720; although there are indications that there were more jobs done by Porres until 1736.

In 1773, the Santa Marta earthquakes destroyed much of the town, which led to the third change in location for the city. The Spanish Crown ordered, in 1776, the removal of the capital to a safer location, the Valley of the Shrine, where Guatemala City, the modern capital of Guatemala, now stands. This new city did not retain its old name and was christened Nueva Guatemala de la Asunción (New Guatemala of the Assumption), and its patron saint is Our Lady of the Assumption. The badly damaged city of Santiago de los Caballeros was ordered abandoned, although not everyone left, and was thereafter referred to as la Antigua Guatemala (the Old Guatemala).

=== Eruption of 3 June 2018 ===
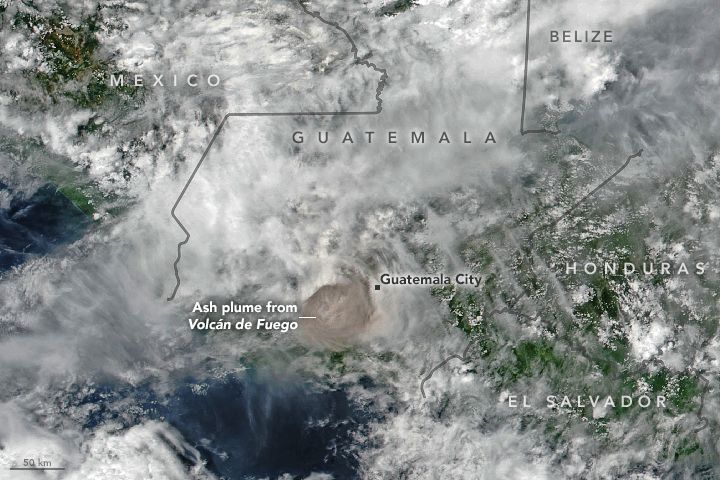
Satellite view of the eruption, showing the ash plume emitted from the volcano

Fuego's most recent period of activity began in 1999 and continues to the present day. This period consists of persistent low-level eruptive activity interspersed with occasional violent explosive "paroxysmal" eruptions. Paroxysmal eruptions (or 'paroxysms') produce a sustained eruptive plume from which ash falls on communities within 20 km of the volcano, lava flows reaching 1–2 km from the summit, and occasional pyroclastic density currents. The largest eruption of Fuego in its current period of activity happened on 3 June 2018, also the most powerful eruption of the volcano since 1974. Fuego generated large pyroclastic flows that gradually filled its drainage ravines (known locally as "barrancas"). The greatest impacts were on the east side of Fuego, where pyroclastic flows filled and eventually overcame the capacity of the Las Lajas ravine to descend on the nearby communities of San Miguel Los Lotes and El Rodeo in Escuintla and the private golf resort of La Reunión in Sacatepéquez. The flows that descended on Los Lotes buried the town in pyroclastic material and killed many of the residents, who had received limited warnings to evacuate. On 5 June, Associated Press reported that at least 99 people are dead and nearly 200 others were unaccounted for following the eruption. Ash fall extended as far as the capital, Guatemala City forcing the closure of La Aurora International Airport. The military assisted in clearing ash off the runway. Rescue attempts were seriously hampered as routes into the affected regions were seriously damaged by the pyroclastic flows.

== List of eruptive events ==
Date	Brief description
1581	Reported by historian Domingo Juarros. Caused damage in the surrounding area. It is possible the damage was related to earthquakes.
1586	Reported by historian Domingo Juarros. Caused damage in the surrounding area. It is possible the damage was related to earthquakes.
1623	Reported by historian Domingo Juarros. Caused damage in the surrounding area. It is possible the damage was related to earthquakes.
1705	Reported by historian Domingo Juarros. Caused damage in the surrounding area. It is possible the damage was related to earthquakes.
1710	Reported by historian Domingo Juarros. Caused damage in the surrounding area. It is possible the damage was related to earthquakes.
27–30 August 1717	Strong eruption right before the San Miguel earthquake.
1732	Reported by historian Domingo Juarros. Caused damage in the surrounding area. It is possible the damage was related to earthquakes.
1737	Reported by historian Domingo Juarros. Caused damage in the surrounding area. It is possible the damage was related to earthquakes.
ca. 1800	Did not have any catastrophic consequence, although it lasted for several days and heated up a nearby stream to the point that "beasts would not dare to cross it".
1880	Reported by Eugenio Dussaussay.
21 January 1932	Strong (VEI 4) eruption that covered Antigua Guatemala in ash. Eruption began at ~2pm and rapidly evolved. 52 years of calm separated the previous eruption in 1880 and this one, Fuego's longest repose period since historic records began.
February - May 1966	3 months of activity, beginning with a mild eruption in February 1966, followed by a more powerful eruption on 20 April - 1 May producing lava flows and pyroclastic flows.
22-24 August 1967	Small eruption causing several communities in Chimaltenango to evacuate. A roof shelter collapsed on evacuees, causing multiple injuries.
14-15 September 1971	Large eruption with a lot of ash fall. Approximately 20% of roofs in San Pedro Yepocapa (west of Fuego's summit) collapsed under the weight of ash from the eruption.
22 February - 3 March 1973	Large eruption producing pyroclastic flows.
10–23 October 1974	Large eruption that caused heavy agricultural losses. Pyroclastic flows destroyed all vegetation in the surroundings of the active cone.
21 May 1999	Moderate eruption producing ash, lava flows, and pyroclastic flows.
4 January 2002	Moderate eruption
29 June 2003	Eruption producing very large pyroclastic flows in Barranca Seca that overspilled the channel and flowed over nearby lands, destroying several houses. This eruption was followed by powerful lahars.
1–6 July 2004	Small eruption preceded by internal explosions.
9 August 2007	Small eruption of lava, rock and ash. Guatemala's volcano monitoring agency (INSIVUMEH) reported that seven families were evacuated from their homes near the volcano.
13 September 2012	The volcano began ejecting lava and ash, prompting officials to begin "a massive evacuation of thousands of people" in five communities. More specifically, the evacuees, roughly 33,000 people, left nearly 17 villages near the volcano. It ejected lava and pyroclastic flows about 600 metres (2,000 ft) down the slope of the volcano.
8 February 2015	A further eruption resulted in 100 nearby residents being evacuated, and the closure of La Aurora International Airport due to the amount of falling ash.
5 May 2017	A eruption resulted in 300 nearby residents from Panimaché Uno and Sangre de Cristo being evacuated. Strong explosions, sometimes producing shock waves, generated dense ash plumes that rose 1.3 km above the crater and drifted more than 50 km S, SW, and W. Ashfall was reported in many areas downwind.
3 June 2018	An eruption resulted in at least 159 deaths and at least 300 injuries, 256 missing persons and residents being evacuated, and the closure of La Aurora International Airport.
20 November 2018	Eruption. Preventive evacuations of approximately 4,000 people from communities near the volcano.
23 September 2021	Eruption producing ash column and generating pyroclastic flows that descended several ravines. No evacuations took place in this eruption.
7 March 2022	Eruption producing ash plumes, fire fountains, and pyroclastic flows (up to 7 km) in several ravines. Around 500 people were evacuated from communities close to the volcano.
4 May 2023	Eruption producing ash and pyroclastic flows. Evacuations of several communities by CONRED.
9 March 2025	Eruption producing ash up to 65km from the summit. Pyroclastic flows were also generated. Evacuations of several communities by CONRED.
4 August 2026	Eruption producing lava fountains, ash columns, and pyroclastic flows. Preventive evacuations were ordered for communities near the volcano, including El Porvenir and Las Lajitas, with around 250 people expected to be relocated by CONRED.

== Early expeditions ==
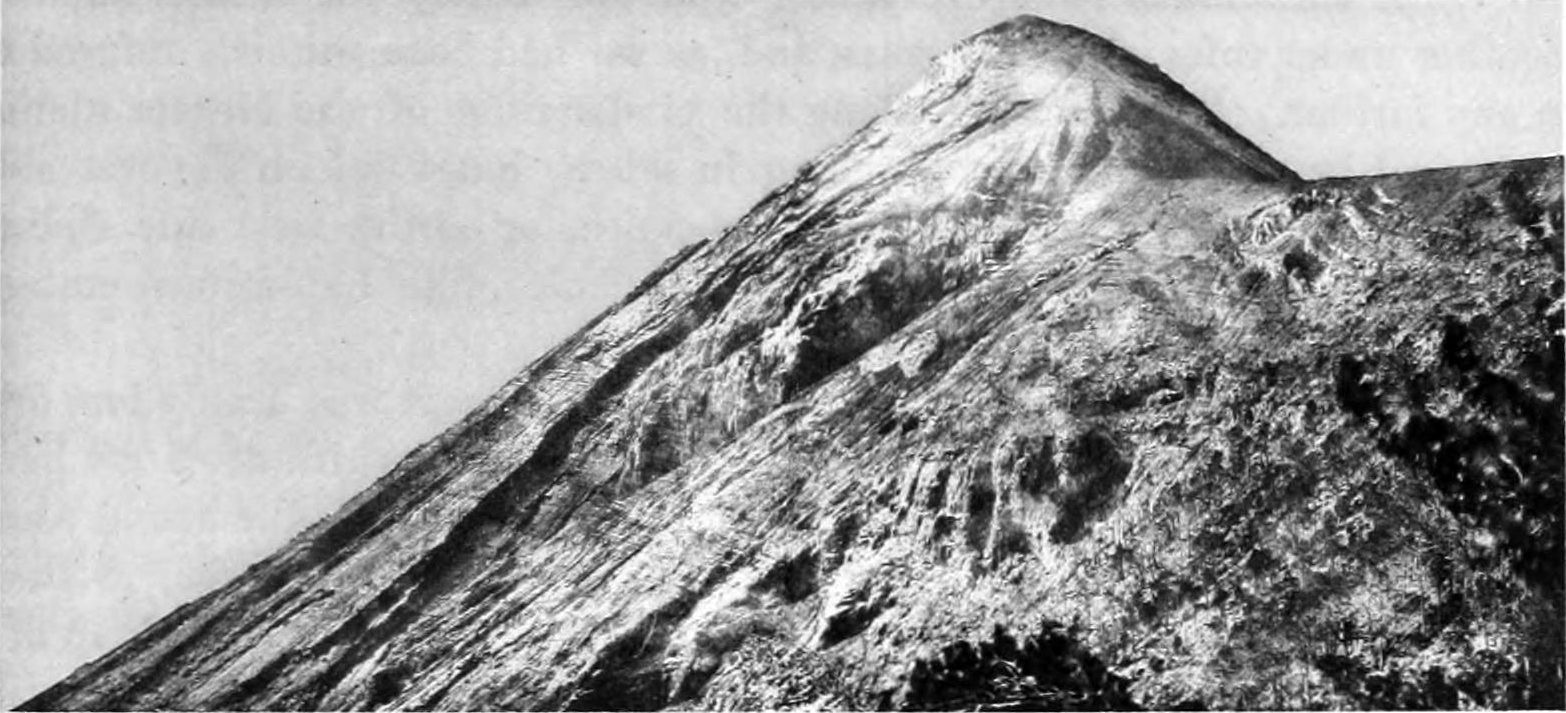
Volcán de Fuego summit as seen from the saddle that separates it from Acatenango in 1899. Photographed by Alfred Percival Maudslay.

In 1881, French writer Eugenio Dussaussay climbed the volcano, then practically unexplored. First, he needed to ask for permission to climb from the Sacatepéquez governor, who gave him a letter for the Alotenango mayor asking for his assistance with guides to help the explorer and his companion, Tadeo Trabanino. They wanted to climb the central peak, unexplored at the time, but could not find a guide and had to climb to the active cone, which had a recent eruption in 1880.

British archeologist Alfred Percival Maudslay climbed the volcano on 7 January 1892. Here is how he described his expedition:

[...] we arranged to start the very next day for the village of Alotenango. On 7 January we left that village about 7 o'clock in the morning with seven Mozos, carrying food, clothing, and my camp-bed, and rode for an hour towards the mountains, when we dismounted and sent back our mules. The first two hours' climb was not so very steep, but it was tiring work walking over the loose mould and dry leaves under the thick forest. [...] we recommenced our climb under shadow of the forest by a steep path cut through the undergrowth. At the height of about 9500 feet we, for the first time since starting, got a sight of the peak rising on the other side of a deep ravine. The whole of the slope on which we looked was bare of vegetation, and presented to the eye nothing but desolate slopes of ashes and scoriae broken higher up with patches of burnt rock; we scrambled on through the thick undergrowth, often with loose earth under foot, and by degrees the vegetation changed and we got amongst the pine-trees. At about 11,200 feet we came to a spot where the earth had been levelled for a few yards by the Indians, and there we determined to pass the night. [...] then returned and watched the reflection of the sunset over the more distant peaks and against the perfect cone of Agua. [...] but the cold which followed the sunset soon took all our attention. [...] We turned out of our shelter at about half-past four in the morning, and felt all the better after drinking hot coffee; we then sat for an hour watching a most beautiful dawn and sunrise. At the opposite side of the valley rose the Volcano of Agua, sloping on one side to the plain of Antigua, and on the other in a long unbroken sweep to the sea, more than forty miles away. Peak after peak stood out against the red light into the far distance, and on the right the low coast-line and the sea showed up very clearly. As soon as the sun was up we started for the summit. I stopped on the way to get a photograph of the cone, which lay to the left of us as we ascended; but the clouds came over just as I was ready, and I had to give it up. A little over 12,000 feet we left the scraggy pine-trees and arrived at the northern end of a cinder ridge, called the Meseta, which is at the summit of the slope we had been climbing.

— Alfred Percival Maudslay, A Glimpse at Guatemala

== See also ==
- List of volcanoes in Guatemala
- List of volcanic eruptions by death toll
