= 2018 Volcán de Fuego eruption =

Volcanic eruption in Guatemala

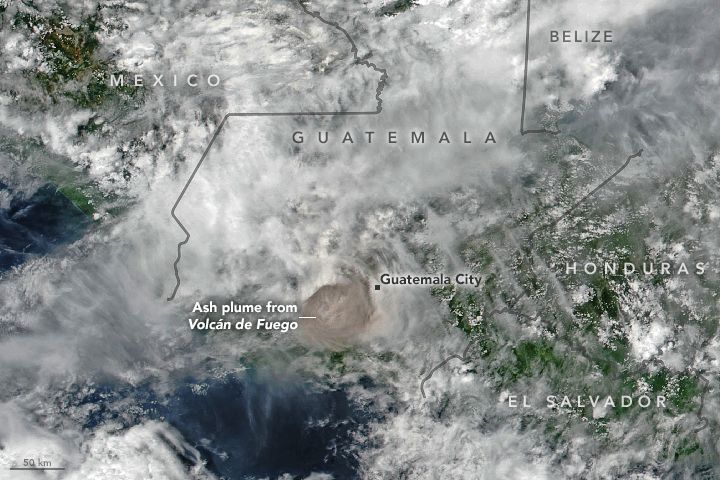
- Ash plume from Volcan de Fuego during the eruption on 3 June
- Volcano: Volcán de Fuego
- Start date: 3 June 2018
- Start time: ~12:00 local time (18:00 UTC)
- Location: Guatemala; 14°28′29″N 90°52′51″W
- VEI: 3
- Deaths: 190–2,900

Maps

The Volcán de Fuego erupted in Guatemala on Sunday 3 June 2018. The eruption produced a large ash plume fed by continuous explosions, pyroclastic flows, and lahars. Pyroclastic flows descended the Las Lajas ravine and overspilled its confines, causing the death of officially nearly 200 people. This was the deadliest eruption in Guatemala since the eruption of Volcán Santiaguito in 1902.

== Background ==
Volcán de Fuego (Spanish for "Volcano of Fire") is one of the most active volcanoes in the world and is located 44 kilometres (27 mi) from Guatemala City. It is a stratovolcano that has had more than 60 eruptions since 1524, including a major eruption in 1974 which produced pyroclastic flows and ashfall that destroyed the region's winter harvest and caused roof collapse and infrastructure damages in nearby towns. The 3 June 2018 eruption is one of several eruptions of Guatemalan volcanoes that have caused many deaths, including the Santa María eruption of 1902 and the Santiaguito dome collapse of 1929, which killed hundreds.

The most recent eruptive phase of Fuego began in 1999 and continues to the present day. Since 1999, Fuego has had several large eruptions, including an eruption on 13 September 2012, in which authorities recommended the evacuation of 33,000 people. In fact, approximately 5,000 people evacuated, and there were no reported deaths. The last eruption of Fuego prior to 3 June 2018 happened on 31 January - 1 February 2018.

The population around the volcano is estimated to be 54,000 within 10 kilometres (6.2 mi) and more than 1 million within 30 kilometres (19 mi).

== Events of eruption ==
San Miguel Los Lotes after the eruption.

Fuego began to show increased explosive activity from around 06:00 on the morning of Sunday 3 June 2018. The eruption continued to get stronger throughout the morning of 3 June, as explosions produced an ash plume that reached 15.2 km altitude and pyroclastic flows descended several of the ravines around the volcano. Most of the injuries and fatalities happened in the towns of San Miguel Los Lotes and El Rodeo, located south-east of Fuego's summit in the Escuintla department. San Miguel Los Lotes, located 2 kilometres (1.2 mi) north of El Rodeo, was covered with ash and rocks from pyroclastic flows. The eruption prompted the evacuation of about 3,100 people from nearby areas. Ashfall forced the shutdown of La Aurora International Airport, Guatemala's primary airport, where members of the Guatemalan military were deployed to remove ash off the runway;. Although some flights were canceled, the airport was reopened on 4 June.

The eruption produced an ash column approximately 15 kilometres (9.3 mi) in height. Pyroclastic flows—fast-moving clouds of hot gas and volcanic matter—caused many of the casualties and crop damage. INSIVUMEH, Guatemala's national scientific monitoring agency, warned on 4 June that further pyroclastic flows and lahars (volcanic mudflows) were possible. Heavy rainfall during and after the eruption produced large and fast-moving lahars. Volcanic material buried several of the affected villages and cut off roadways. The poor weather and volcanic deposits complicated the recovery operation, and all rescue efforts were suspended overnight on 3 June. The volcanic material also destroyed an estimated 21,000 acres (8,500 hectares) of corn, bean, and coffee crops.

=== Continued volcanic activity in June ===
On 5 June, a second eruption occurred and prompted additional evacuations. On 8 June, new volcanic flows prompted more evacuations of rescue workers and residents of the town of El Rodeo, who had recently returned to their homes and were told to leave once again. On 9 June, additional lahars prompted preventive evacuations in Santa Lucía Cotzumalguapa.

=== Later eruptions of Fuego in 2018 ===
An eruption of Fuego occurred on 12–13 October 2018, producing lava fountaining and a lava flow reaching 1 km from the volcano's summit. On 18 November 2018, Volcán de Fuego entered a new eruptive and violent phase that prompted preventive evacuations of approximately 4,000 people from communities near the volcano. CONRED issued a red alert in the area that closed main roads and suspended flights at the La Aurora International Airport.

== Victims ==
At least 190 people were killed, 57 injured, and 256 remained missing as of 30 July 2018—including a number of children, a CONRED officer, firefighters, and a policeman—although local residents estimate that approximately 2,000 people are buried and a local organization said that up to 2,900 may have died. Due to the intense heat and burn injuries, many bodies were planned to be identified with anthropological methods and DNA. As of 18 June 2018, up to 159 cases entered the morgues, with 85 of the victims having been identified.

=== Animals ===
Animals such as dogs, cats, chickens, monkeys, donkeys and other species were found by rescuers with burns or blinded by the eruption. In many cases urgent veterinary care was required to treat eye infections, respiratory problems, and burns caused by dust, hot ash and gas from the eruption. In one instance, a dog led rescuers towards its destroyed owners' home, where his owner, and the rest of people in the house, had been killed.

== Response ==
President Jimmy Morales ordered three days of national mourning in response to the disaster and visited some of the affected towns and villages in person on 4 June. Messages of support, solidarity, and offers of assistance were given by various world leaders.

The Coordinadora Nacional para la Reducción de Desastres (CONRED), Guatemala's disaster relief agency, reported that more than 1.7 million people have been affected by the eruption and its ashfall. A state of emergency was declared in the departments of Escuintla, Chimaltenango, and Sacatepéquez.

Organizations such as GoFundMe, Cruz Roja Guatemalteca, and The National Federation of Cooperatives are being used to raise physical and monetary donations to be dispersed to those affected by the eruption. GoFundMe created a centralized hub for all verified campaigns that are providing aid to those affected.

Severely wounded individuals are scheduled to receive medical attention in the United States and Mexico, and an emergency medical team from Shriners Hospitals for Children would travel from the United States.

=== Recovery ===
The Guatemalan Mountain Rescue Brigade were already searching for a missing person when they suddenly realized that the volcano's activity had increased. Firefighters have been deployed in order to help evacuate residents and recover bodies. Family members who grew tired of waiting for organized efforts by the government organized their own groups of recovery operations and defied police roadblocks to dig at the debris.

A member of a firefighter support organization stated, "Basically there's no houses left, and to my assumption there's nobody left there... except the people doing the search and rescue." A volunteer firefighter added that the ground was very unstable and that breathing was difficult and firefighters' boot soles had been torn off because of the heat.

Firefighters have stated that after 72 hours the chance of finding anyone alive would be nonexistent.

== Controversy ==
On 7 June, opposition politician Mario Taracena, in an address to Congress, accused the executive secretary of the National Coordination for Disaster Reduction (CONRED) of mismanaging the disaster warnings. The director of the National Institute for Seismology, Vulcanology, Meteorology and Hydrology also came under criticism for mismanagement and lack of warnings, a claim they refuted. Taracena also called for a government investigation into potential criminal negligence. A lawmaker told reporters that seismologists warned of the eruption eight hours before the main eruption, however, three hours later the national disaster agency CONRED called for voluntary evacuations only. Mandatory evacuations were ordered at 3pm local time, after some communities were already covered by volcanic flow.

== See also ==
- List of large volcanic eruptions in the 21st century
- List of large volcanic eruptions of the 20th century
- List of volcanic eruptions by death toll
- 1902 eruption of Santa María
