= 2024–2026 Kanlaon eruptions =

Volcanic eruptions in the Philippines

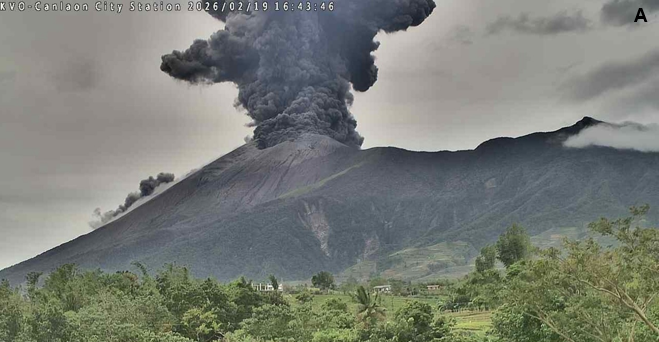
- Eruption of Kanlaon Volcano in February 2026
- Volcano: Kanlaon
- Date: June 3, 2024–present: First major eruption: June 3, 2024; Second major eruption: December 9, 2024; Third major eruption: April 8, 2025; Fourth major eruption: May 13, 2025; Fifth major eruption: February 19, 2026; Sixth major eruption: February 26, 2026; Seventh major eruption: March 15, 2026; Eighth major eruption: July 9, 2026; Ninth major eruption: October 10, 2026
- Type: Explosive eruption
- Location: Negros Island Region, Philippines; 10°24′40″N 123°07′54″E
- VEI: 3 (2024 June eruption); 2 (2024 October–December eruption)
- Impact: 57,563 affected 3,905 displaced US$3.07 million in damages (June 2024 eruption); 40,489 affected US$681,314 in damages (December 2024 eruption)

Kanlaon Volcano in the Negros Island Region of the Philippines began erupting on June 3, 2024, when an explosive eruption from its summit vent spewed ash over parts of Bago, La Carlota, La Castellana, and Canlaon. As a result, evacuations were ordered for five barangays situated near the volcano. Volcanic activity increased again on December 9, with eruptions generating a shock wave and a plume visible as far away as the islands of Panay, Guimaras, and Cebu. Since then, at least five more large eruptions and numerous smaller ash emissions have occurred with varying intensity.

About 57,563 people were affected by the June 2024 eruption, with 3,905 displaced, 2,680 houses damaged, and an estimated US$3.07 million in agricultural losses. The December 2024 eruption affected around 40,489 people in the Visayas, causing an estimated US$681,314 in agricultural damage across approximately 298.05 ha (736.5 acres) of land. The April 2025 eruption displaced more than 8,600 families, or about 28,272 people, from 34 barangays in Negros Occidental and Negros Oriental.

== Volcanic activity ==
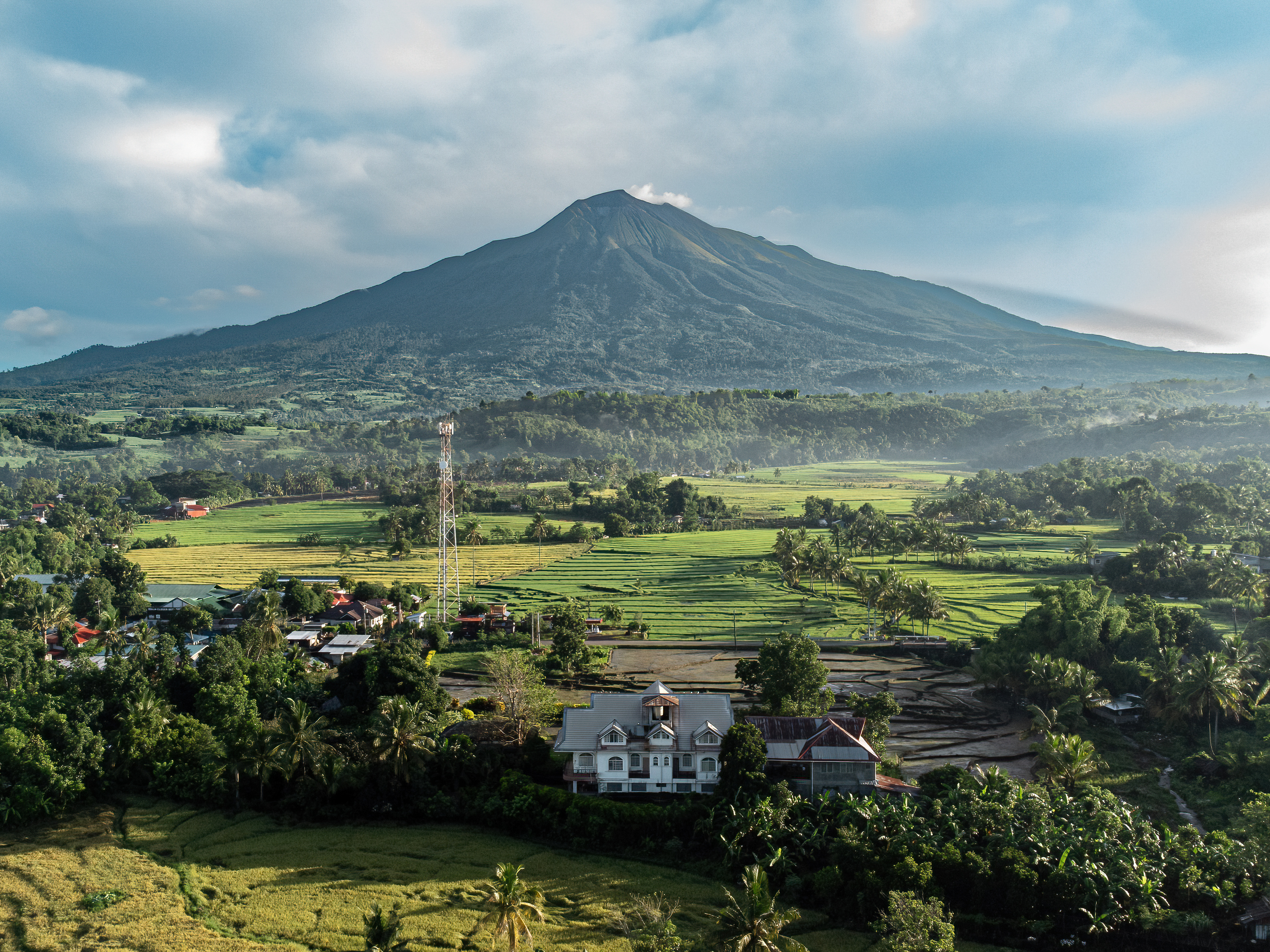
Kanlaon in 2023, one year before the eruption

=== Activity increase in 2020 ===
On March 11, 2020, PHIVOLCS raised the volcano's alert level from 0 to 1 due to its abnormal activities since March 9. 80 volcanic earthquakes were plotted since then. On June 21, the volcano showed some signs of increased unrest. By June 22, the volcano's activity continued, with a series of tectonic earthquakes ranging from M_{w} 3.2 to M_{w} 4.7. A total of 278 earthquakes was observed for a 72-hour period (from June 21, 8AM – June 24, 8AM), possibly related to the magmatic activity underneath the volcano. Earthquakes continued, with steam and fumarolic activity rising 200–300 meters above. PHIVOLCS reminded the public to stay away to the 4-km PDZ (Permanent Danger Zone) around the volcano, as abnormal conditions and sudden phreatic explosions might occur.

=== 2024 activity ===
On June 3, 2024, PHIVOLCS raised the alert level of Kanlaon from alert level 1 to alert level 2, indicating increasing unrest after an explosive eruption occurred on its summit vent at 6:51 p.m. PST. The eruption produced a voluminous and incandescent plume that rose 5,000 metres (16,000 feet) above the vent and a probable short pyroclastic flow of approximately 2-3 km down the south and southeastern slopes of the volcano. The eruption lasted for six minutes and was followed by a relatively strong volcanic earthquake. Sulfurous odors and ashfall were reported by communities on the western slope of the volcano, particularly in Bago, La Carlota, La Castellana, and Canlaon. The same reports came in from as far away as Bacolod, 85 km (53 mi) away. Particles from the volcano were deposited in the form of haze as far as the Bicol Region. On June 5, rains triggered lahar flows in La Castellana.

Kanlaon erupted on December 9, 2024, releasing a plume of volcanic ash and pyroclastic flow that reached 4,000 metres (13,000 feet)

On July 15, 2024, PHIVOLCS issued a notice regarding the increasing swelling of Kanlaon's edifice, which has been persisting since mid-June. PHIVOLCS noted that this ongoing ground deformation could indicate magmatic intrusion, potentially increasing the likelihood of eruptive activity. Increased activity was recorded by PHIVOLCS in September, starting with a series of volcano-tectonic earthquakes on September 9. On September 10, Kanlaon produced its highest volume of sulfur dioxide emissions since 2009, at 9,985 tonnes, prompting PHIVOLCS to raise concern over its possible first magmatic eruption since 1902. The record was surpassed the next day, when 11,556 tons of sulfur dioxide was emitted.

On October 19, 2024, the summit crater of the volcano exhibited continuous degassing, along with occasional weak ash emissions. PHIVOLCS recorded twenty-eight instances of ash emissions, ranging from four minutes to one hour and eighteen minutes in duration, producing grayish plumes that rose 300–800 metres (980–2,620 feet) above the summit and drifted to the west. On October 28, PHIVOLCS reported that sulfur dioxide gas emissions from the summit crater of Kanlaon totaled 10,074 tonnes, making it the fifth highest emission recorded from the volcano since instrumental gas monitoring began. Late on October 31, sixty-four volcano-tectonic earthquakes were recorded, with magnitudes ranging from M_{w} 0.9 to M_{w} 2.9, occurring at depths of 2–8 km (1–5 mi).

Before the December eruption, PHIVOLCS noted a significant decrease in summit emissions, with the average sulfur dioxide level dropping to 1,669, and only six minor volcano-tectonic earthquakes were detected, with no significant seismic activity observed leading up to the eruption.

On December 9, PHIVOLCS raised the alert level of Kanlaon from level 2 to level 3 after an explosive eruption occurred at the summit vent at 3:03 p.m. The eruption produced a large plume that rose 4,000 metres (13,000 feet) above the vent and drifted west-southwest, with pyroclastic flow moving down the south-southeastern side of the volcano. A resident volcanologist from PHIVOLCS said that a shockwave was also heard. Ashfall was recorded in Canlaon as well as in ten municipalities and cities of Negros Occidental, and affected other islands such as Guimaras and Panay, particularly in southern Iloilo and Antique. The volcanic plume was visible as far as Iloilo City and Toledo, Cebu.

On December 23, PHIVOLCS issued a notice saying that dark ash had been emitted from the summit of Kanlaon Volcano, accompanied by weak, low-frequency volcanic earthquakes. The activity produced a dark plume approximately 1.2 kilometres (3,900 feet) tall, drifting to the northwest, and ash emissions continued on the next day. On December 25, PHIVOLCS reported an increase in sulfur dioxide emissions from Kanlaon Volcano, measuring 6,014 tons compared to 3,585 tons on the previous day. Elevated sulfur dioxide emissions are typically associated with rising magma and may indicate the potential for further volcanic activity.

Eruption of Kanlaon on April 8, 2025

=== 2025 activity ===
On January 11, PHIVOLCS issued a significant warning about increased ground swelling and pressurization in Kanlaon. PHIVOLCS said that the changes were similar to the conditions observed prior to the volcano's eruption in December 2024. A minor eruption occurred on February 6.

Kanlaon had a moderate explosive eruption on May 13, 2025, ejecting large ballistic fragments around the crater.

On April 7, 14 volcanic earthquakes were recorded at Kanlaon, along with moderate ash plumes that rose up to 300 metres (980 feet) in height. On April 8, an explosive eruption began at 5:51 a.m. and ended at 6:47 a.m., producing a 4,000 metres (13,000 feet) high “voluminous” plume that drifted southwest along with pyroclastic flows. Debris ejected by the eruption also ignited vegetation and caused wildfires near the crater, which spread in part due to dry and hot weather conditions before it was contained on April 9 after heavy rains.

At around 2:55 a.m. on May 13, Kanlaon experienced a moderately explosive eruption that lasted about five minutes. It released a plume of ash and steam reaching up to 4,500 metres (14,800 feet) high, which drifted westward. Residents of Brgy. Pula in Canlaon, Negros Oriental and La Castellana reported hearing loud rumbling sounds during the eruption. PHIVOLCS reported that large ballistic fragments were ejected around the crater, landing within a few hundred meters and burning nearby vegetation near the summit, while pyroclastic flows swept down the southern slopes, reaching up to 2 kilometres (6,600 feet) from the crater. Ashfall from the eruption reached Panay, causing flight disruptions at Iloilo International Airport. On May 23, a lahar flow damaged a bridge in La Castellana.

On July 29, PHIVOLCS lowered its alert level for Kanlaon from three (magmatic unrest / high level of volcanic unrest) to two (moderate level of volcanic unrest), citing decreased activity. On September 8, Kanlaon produced a 75 m (246 ft) ash column, followed by another one measuring 600 m (2,000 ft) on September 10. On October 5, Kanlaon emitted a 500 m (1,600 ft) ash plume. Another 500 m (1,600 ft) ash plume was emitted on October 12. On October 24, Kanlaon underwent a minor explosive eruption that lasted three minutes and resulted in the formation of pyroclastic flows in the volcano's southern slopes and a 2,000 m (6,600 ft) ash cloud that drifted northwest.

=== 2026 activity ===
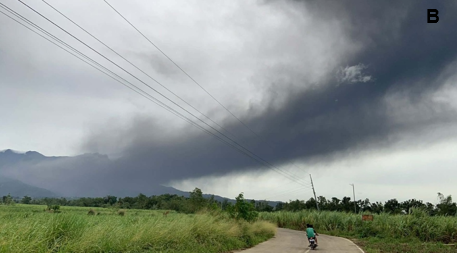
After the February 2026 eruption of Kanlaon

Before the eruption on February 19, PHIVOLCS recorded ten volcanic earthquakes, including seven low-frequency events associated with gas activity; SO₂ emissions had decreased to 174 tonnes per day, compared to the long-term average of 2,823 tonnes per day since June 3, 2024, and the volcano had shown slow but continuous inflation due to deep magma intrusion, with short-term inflation beginning in late January 2026, indicating pressurization prior to the moderately explosive eruption.

On February 19, a moderately explosive eruption occurred at 4:38 p.m. and lasted for two minutes, generating an eruption plume that rose to 2,000 m (6,600 ft) high and drifted southwest. Pyroclastic flows were also observed descending the southern and southwestern slopes of the volcano. PHIVOLCS reported that sulfurous fumes were observed in the barangays of La Carlota, Bago, and Moises Padilla, Negros Occidental, while the eruption also produced a shock wave heard as a booming sound and felt more than 30 kilometers from the crater, which was recorded by an infrasound station about 4 kilometers southeast of the crater. PHIVOLCS also reported light to moderate ashfall in 41 barangays across Bago, Pontevedra, and La Carlota in Negros Occidental.

Three further moderate eruptions occurred on February 26, March 15. and July 9.

== Response ==
Volcanic cloud from the Kanlaon eruption captured by the Japan Meteorological Agency Himawari-9 Air Mass and shown using the Geo2Grid on December 9, 2024

During the June 2024 eruption, evacuations were ordered in Canlaon for five barangays near the volcano and communities located along rivers flowing from the volcano, as well as in La Carlota and La Castellana. A mask mandate was also imposed in San Carlos. At least 4,752 people were displaced, while offices in Canlaon were ordered closed on June 4. Authorities in Negros Occidental were also placed on heightened alert, with ashfall warnings declared in Canlaon, La Carlota and La Castellana. At least 29 flights at Ninoy Aquino International Airport in Manila as well as in Iloilo, Cebu, Kalibo, Bacolod, Davao, Cagayan de Oro, General Santos, and San Jose Airports were canceled due to the eruption. At least 248 people were evacuated in Canlaon. On June 4, several flights were canceled and a mandatory emergency evacuation within a 3-kilometer radius was ordered. Canlaon Mayor Jose Chubasco Cardenas said that 23,622 residents of five barangays were affected. President Bongbong Marcos assured that the government is prepared to offer support to those impacted by the eruption of Kanlaon Volcano.

After the December 2024 eruption, PHIVOLCS instructed local government units to evacuate residents within a 6-kilometer radius of the volcano's summit and to prepare for possible additional evacuations if the volcanic activity increased. Canlaon Mayor Jose Chubasco Cardenas advised residents in affected areas to prepare for mandatory evacuations. As a precaution, classes and work in local government offices were suspended, and a curfew was imposed, with all establishments required to close from 10 p.m. to 5 a.m. Additionally, a liquor ban was enforced. Several flights were cancelled at Iloilo International Airport. A health advisory was issued in Toledo, Cebu due to air pollution risks caused by the eruption. The Office of Civil Defense said that around 87,000 people had to be evacuated, with 46,900 of them living in La Castellana. A price freeze was imposed in Negros Occidental to curb "predatory pricing" by businesses and prevent the hoarding of goods. A tent city was established in Himamaylan to house displaced residents in the event of an escalation. The Babaylan Festival dance ritual competition scheduled on February 19, 2025, was cancelled by the city government of Bago, citing Kanlaon's activity. Following the April 2025 eruption, classes were suspended in La Carlota and La Castellana. After the February 2026 eruption, the Department of the Interior and Local Government ordered local governments in Negros Island to enforce strict safety precautions, emphasizing the need to keep danger zones clear and directing local officials to ensure that no residents remain inside restricted areas.

== Impact and aftermath ==
Directorate-General for European Civil Protection and Humanitarian Aid Operations (DG ECHO) daily situation map for the Philippines on July 6

The town of La Castellana lost ₱11.33 million (US$230,075.26), during the eruption, and the city of Canlaon lost ₱93.49 million (US$1.9 million). The eruption impacted the inflation rate from 4.1 percent to 4.3 percent after the eruption. 29 flights were cancelled during the eruption. A state of calamity was declared in Canlaon and La Castellana. Around 23,000 hectares of sugarcane fields on Negros Island were affected by the eruption, while a curfew and water rationing was imposed in La Carlota and La Castellana due to sulfur contamination in regular sources. On June 18, 2024, La Castellana was given permission for more than 400 evacuees to return to their homes. Affected families were given food, hygiene kits, sleeping kits, kitchen kits, which was worth ₱26 million (US$527,918.78) by the Department of Social Welfare and Development. Canlaon was given ₱2 million (US$40,609.14) in financial aid, and La Castellana was given ₱1 million (US$20,304.57).

As of September 22, 2024, the National Disaster Risk Reduction and Management Council (NDRRMC) reported that the June 2024 volcanic eruption affected 57,563 people, displacing 3,905 individuals and damaging 2,680 homes. The agricultural sector suffered an estimated loss of ₱150.96 million (US$3.07 million), with 1,595.81 ha (3,943.3 acres) of land impacted. Following the December 2024 eruption, the NDRRMC estimated that around 46,259 people in the Visayas were affected and reported that assistance and relief goods worth ₱148.97 million (US$3.02 million), had been distributed to the affected families. The agricultural sector suffered an estimated loss of ₱33.55 million (US$681,314.14), with 298.05 ha (736.5 acres) of land impacted. According to the NDRRMC, a state of calamity was declared in 31 cities and municipalities due to the severe impact of the volcanic eruption. More than 8,600 families—or about 28,272 people—from 34 barangays in Negros Occidental and Negros Oriental were displaced after the eruption of Kanlaon in April 2025. On April 24, President Bongbong Marcos created a national task force to oversee the government's response to the eruption.

== See also ==
- List of large volcanic eruptions in the 21st century
