= Gladak Perak Bridge =

Gladak Perak Bridge Jembatan Gladak Perak
- Coordinates: 8°10′52.91″S 113°1′9.21″E
- Crossed: Besuk Sat River
- Locale: Sumberwuluh, Candipuro, Lumajang Regency, East Java, Indonesia

Characteristics
- Total length: 100 m

History
- Opened: 1930 (old bridge); 1998 (new bridge)
- Collapsed: 4 December 2021

The Gladak Perak Bridge, also called the Besuk Koboan Bridge, was the name of two bridges located in Lumajang Regency, East Java, Indonesia. These bridges were referred to as the Old Gladak Perak Bridge and the New Gladak Perak Bridge. The old one was built between 1925 and 1930 during the Dutch East Indies era and was no longer used for vehicles. The new bridge was built in 1998 to be used for vehicular traffic. Both bridges were destroyed as a result of the 2021 Semeru eruption on 4 December.
