= San Miguel Los Lotes =

- Village
- Location in Guatemala
- Coordinates: 14°24′31″N 90°49′41″W
- Country: Guatemala
- Department: Escuintla
- Municipality: Escuintla
- Time zone: UTC-6 (Central Time)
- Climate: Cwb

San Miguel Los Lotes is a former village on the border of the Escuintla Department and Sacatepéquez Department of Guatemala.

It was buried by a pyroclastic flow during the 2018 Volcán de Fuego eruption on 3 June 2018.

The former Village of San Miguel Los Lotes, buried by a pyroclastic flow from Volcán Fuego on June 3, 2018. It is now officially designated as a national cemetery by the Government of Guatemala.
