= Coordinadora Nacional para la Reducción de Desastres =

Guatemalan government agency

Coordinadora Nacional para la Reducción de Desastres (CONRED)
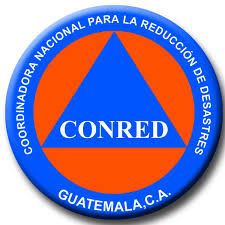
- Seal of CONRED

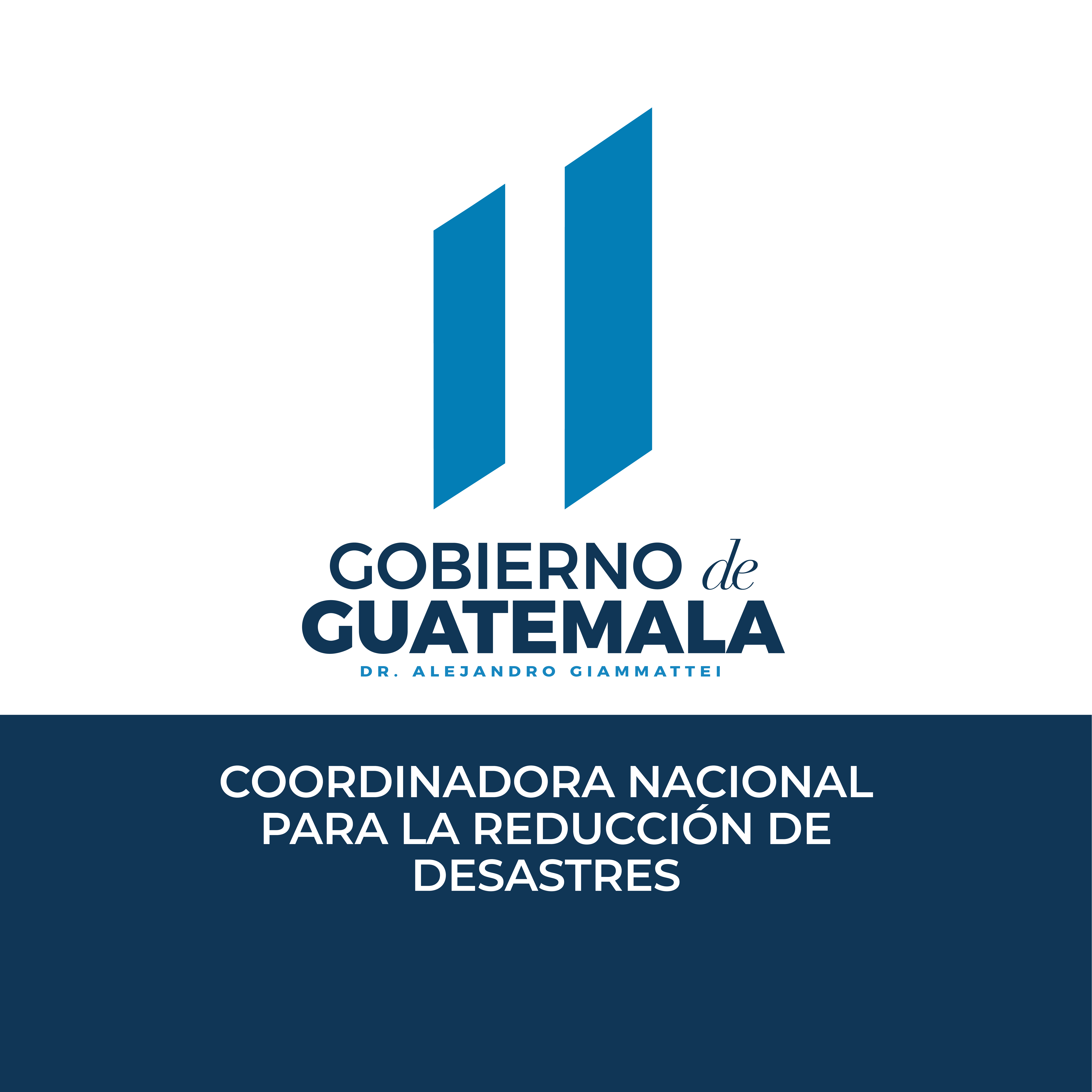
- Logo used by the government

Agency overview
- Formed: November 11, 1996
- Preceding agency: Comité Nacional de Emergencia (CONE)
- Jurisdiction: Government of Guatemala
- Headquarters: Avenida Hincapié 21-72, Zona 13, Guatemala City
- Annual budget: Q. 42 million
- Agency executives: Oscar Estuardo Cossío Cámara, Executive Secretary; Sergio Antonio Reyes Recinos, Undersecretary for Coordination and Administration; Walter René Monroy Valenzuela, Undersecretary for Risk Reduction Management
- Website: www.conred.gob.gt

The National Coordination for Disaster Reduction (Spanish: Coordinadora Nacional para la Reducción de Desastres, CONRED) is a Guatemalan government organization created to prevent disasters or reduce their impact on society, and coordinate disaster relief efforts. Day-to-day management is carried out by the Executive Secretary of CONRED, also known as SE-CONRED. The current Executive Secretary of CONRED is Oscar Estuardo Cossío Cámara, a former Vice Minister of Defense and former general of the Guatemalan Army.

CONRED is responsible for assessing potential hazards, impending or actual disasters based on information provided by the National Institute for Seismology, Vulcanology, Meteorology and Hydrology (INSIVUMEH), and for declaring states of alert. Once a disaster has been declared, it is responsible for the coordination of cross-sectoral disaster relief efforts.

CONRED is part of a Central American network of governmental disaster relief agencies known as the Coordination Center for the Prevention of Natural Disasters in Central America (Spanish: Centro de Coordinación para la Prevención de los Desastres Naturales en América Central (CEPREDENAC)). CEPREDENAC was created in the context of the Central American Integration System.

== History ==
CONRED was officially established in 1996 by the Guatemalan congress in Decree No. 109-96, Law on the National Coordinator for the Reduction of Natural or Manmade Disasters (Spanish: Decreto No. 109-96, Ley de la Coordinadora Nacional para la Reduccion de Desastres de Origen Natural o Provocado). The organization was intended as a civilian successor to CONE, the military-led National Committee on Emergency.

== List of Executive Secretaries ==
Executive Secretary of CONRED
Officeholder	From	To
Colonel Homero García	1997	1998
Jorge Estuardo Ayala Marroquín	1999	2000
Alejandro Maldonado Lutomirsky	2000	2004
Hugo René Hernández	2004	2008
Alejandro Maldonado Lutomirsky	2008	2016
Sergio Garcia Cabañas	2016	2020
Colonel Miguel Ángel Escribá Pimentel	2020	2020
General Oscar Estuardo Cossío Cámara	2020	present
