= Instituto Nacional de Sismología, Vulcanología, Meteorología e Hidrología =

Scientific agency of the Guatemalan government

Instituto Nacional de Sismología, Vulcanología, Meteorología e Hidrología (INSIVUMEH)
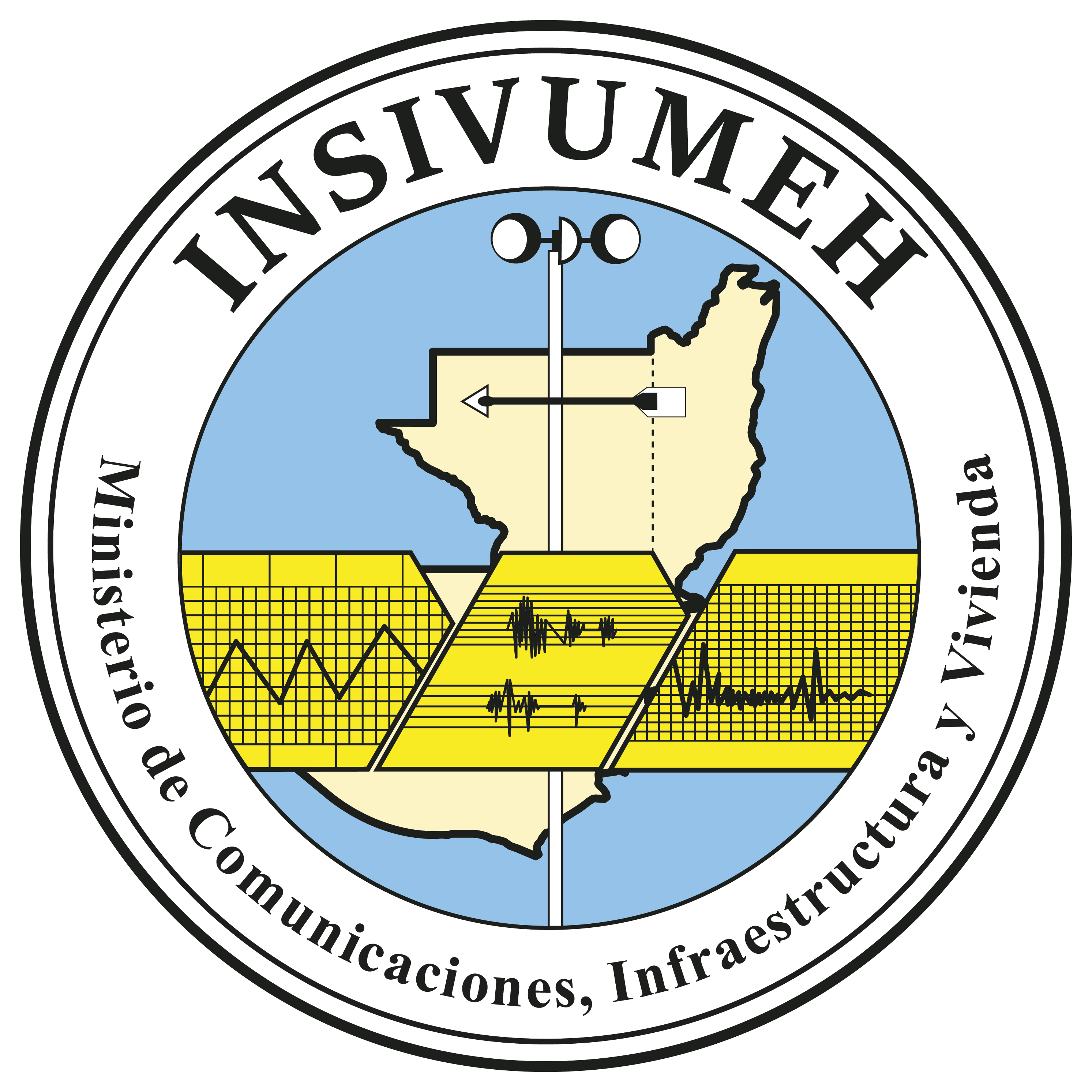
- Logo of INSIVUMEH

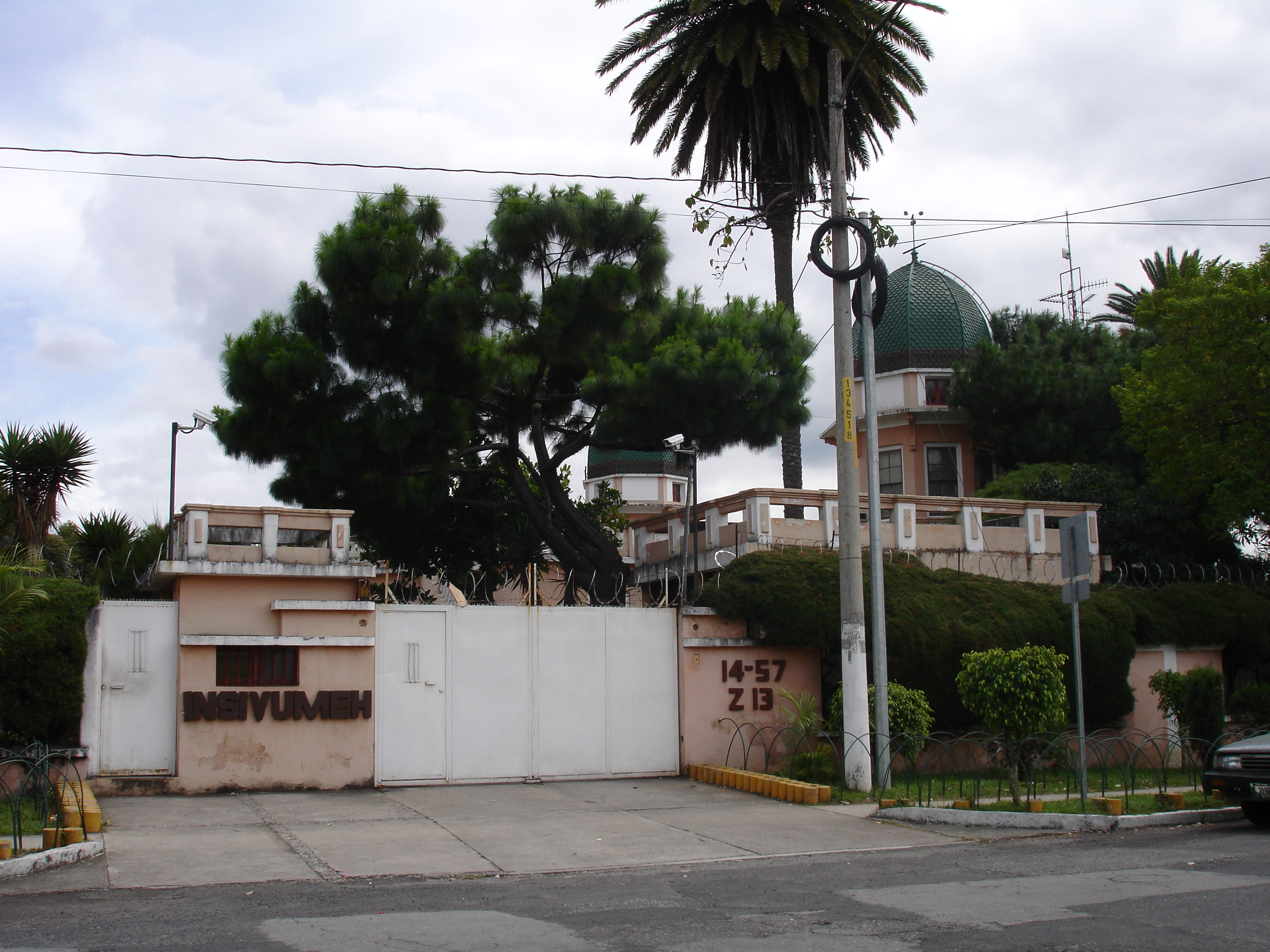
- Headquarters of the agency

Agency overview
- Formed: March 26, 1976
- Jurisdiction: Government of Guatemala
- Headquarters: Guatemala City
- Annual budget: Q 29,085,525 (2008) (US$ 2,647,272)
- Agency executives: Juan Pablo Oliva Hernández, General Director; Raúl Armando Salguero Girón, Deputy General Director
- Parent agency: Ministry of Communications, Infrastructure and Housing
- Website: www.insivumeh.gob.gt

The National Institute for Seismology, Vulcanology, Meteorology and Hydrology of Guatemala (in Spanish: Instituto Nacional de Sismología, Vulcanología, Meteorología e Hidrología (INSIVUMEH)) is a scientific agency of the Guatemalan government. The agency was created to study and monitor atmospheric, geophysical and hydrological phenomena and events, their hazards to Guatemalan society, and to provide recommendations to the government and the private sector in the occurrence of natural disasters. The agency has four major scientific disciplines, concerning Seismology, Vulcanology, Meteorology and Hydrology.

The INSIVUMEH was created in March 1976, shortly after the major 1976 Guatemala earthquake and is part of the Ministry of Communications, Infrastructure and Housing.
