= Kamchatka Volcanic Eruption Response Team =

Volcano research center in Russia

Coordinates: 53°4′00″N 158°36′27″E

- KVERT Logo

Agency overview
- Formed: 1993
- Headquarters: Petropavlovsk-Kamchatsky, Russia
- Agency executive: Dr. Olga A. Girina, Head of KVERT (IVS FEB RAS)
- Website: http://kvert.febras.net/

The Kamchatka Volcanic Eruption Response Team (KVERT) is a Russian national institution dedicated to provide information of any volcanic activity taking place on the Kamchatka Peninsula and the Kuril Islands of Russia that could become a threat to local communities and aviation. It was established in 1993 by the Far Eastern Branch of the Russian Academy of Sciences, Institute of Volcanic Geology and Seismology (IVS FEB RAS) under cooperation with the Kamchatkan Branch of Geophysical Survey (KBGS RAS). The Alaska Volcano Observatory (AVO), United States Geological Survey (USGS) and its affiliates also provide joint efforts to the program. The KVERT website, posted in both Russian and English, allows users to view information on volcanoes in the region and monitor reports of active volcanoes. A section also provides webcameras at select locations that update regularly. As of 2022, around 66 active volcanoes (31 on the Kamchatka Peninsula and 35 in the Kuril Islands) are routinely monitored. The majority of the volcanoes on the Kuril Islands are monitored by the Sakhalin Volcanic Eruption Response Team (SVERT), which is located in Yuzhno-Sakhalinsk, but all reports of volcanic activity in the island chain are posted in joint effort on the KVERT website.

The offices for KVERT are located at the Institute of Volcanic Geology and Seismology in Petropavlovsk-Kamchatsky on the Kamchatka Peninsula.

== Monitored volcanoes ==
The following list shows volcanoes currently monitored by KVERT or SVERT. Many rely on the use of activity detection instruments or satellite and local observations. While the majority of these volcanoes are in remote locations and would only pose a threat to aviation, there are a few that could have an impact on populated communities. Monitored volcanoes are not limited to the ones currently listed, and more may be added in the future if necessary.

=== Kamchatka Peninsula ===
- Akademia Nauk in the central region
- Avachinsky in the central region
- Bezymianny in the northern region
- Diky Greben in the southern region
- Gamchen in the central region
- Gorely in the southern region
- Ichinsky in the northern region
- Ilyinsky in the southern region
- Kambalny in the southern region
- Karymsky in the central region
- Khangar in the central region
- Khodutka in the southern region
- Kikhpinych in the central region
- Kizimen in the central region
- Kliuchevskoi in the northern region
- Komarov in the central region
- Koryaksky in the central region
- Koshelev in the southern region
- Krasheninnikov in the central region
- Kronotsky in the central region
- Ksudach in the southern region
- Maly Semyachik in the central region
- Mutnovsky in the southern region
- Opala in the southern region
- Sheveluch in the northern region
- Taunshits in the central region
- Tolbachik in the northern region
- Ushkovsky in the northern region
- Vysoky in the central region
- Zheltovsky in the southern region
- Zhupanovsky in the central region

=== Kuril Islands ===
- Antsiferov on Antsiferov Island
- Alaid on Atlasov Island
- Atsonupuri on Iturup Island
- Baransky on Iturup Island
- Berutarube on Iturup Island
- Bogatyr Ridge on Iturup Island (includes Stokap)
- Bogdan Khmelnitsky on Iturup Island
- Brat Chirpoyev on Brat Chirpoyev Island
- Chikurachki on Paramushir Island (includes the Lomonosov and Tatarinov groups)
- Chirinkotan on Chirinkotan Island
- Chyorny on Chirpoy Island
- Ebeko on Paramushir Island
- Ekarma on Ekarma Island
- Fuss Peak on Paramushir Island
- Golovnin on Kunashir Island
- Goryashchy on Simushir Island
- Grozny Group on Iturup Island
- Karpinsky Group on Paramushir Island
- Kolokol Group on Urup Island (includes Berg and Trezubets)
- Kuntomintar on Shiashkotan Island
- Medvezhya Volcanic Group on Iturup Island (includes Kudryavy)
- Mendeleyeva on Kunashir Island
- Nemo Peak on Onekotan Island
- Pallas Peak on Ketoy Island
- Prevo Peak on Simushir Island
- Raikoke on Raikoke Island
- Rasshua on Rasshua Island
- Sarychev Peak on Matua Island
- Severgin on Kharimkotan Island
- Sinarka on Shiashkotan Island
- Snow on Chirpoy Island
- Tao-Rusyr Caldera on Onekotan Island (includes Krenitsyn Peak)
- Tyatya on Kunashir Island
- Yankicha in the Ushishir Islands
- Zavaritski Caldera on Simushir Island

== See also ==
- Russian Academy of Sciences
- Alaska Volcano Observatory
