= Lvinaya Past =

Volcano in the Kuril Islands

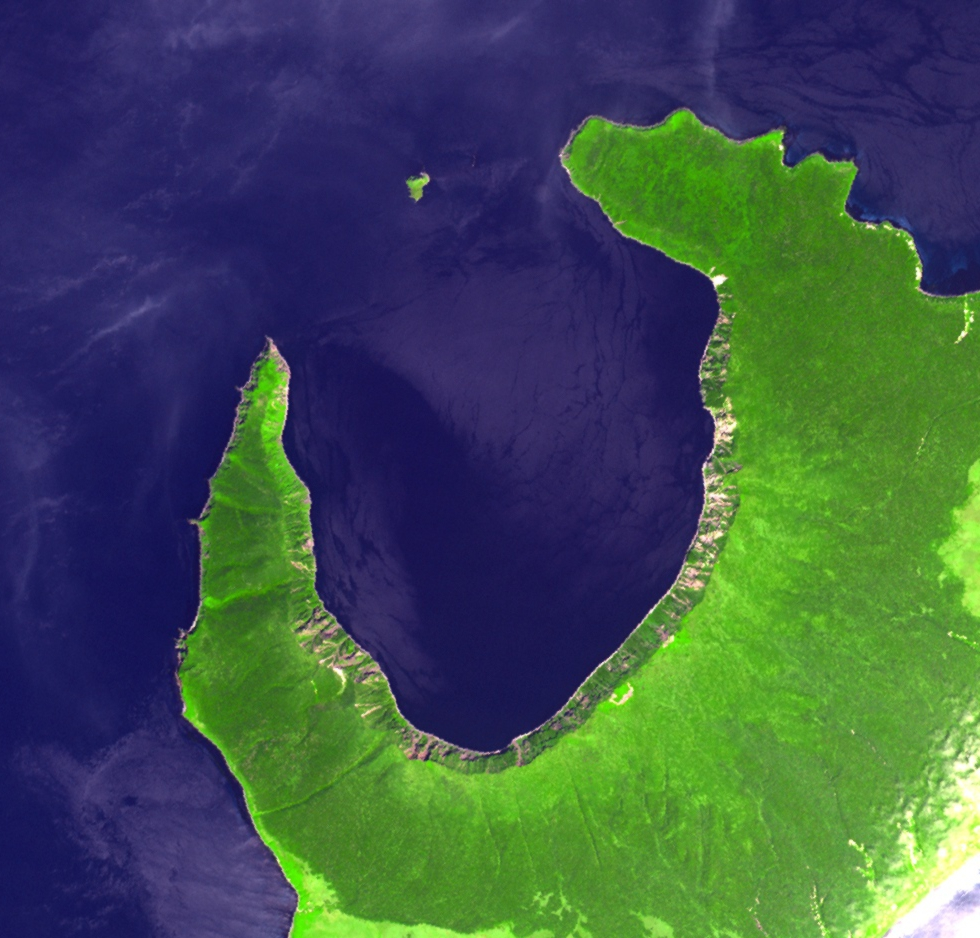

Highest point
- Elevation: 528 m (1,732 ft)
- Coordinates: 44.608°N 146.994°E

Geography
- Location within Russia
- Location: Iturup, Kuril Islands, Russia

Geology
- Mountain type: Stratovolcano / Caldera
- Last eruption: 7480 BC ± 80 years

Lvinaya Past (Russian: Львиная Пасть, literally "Lion's Maw", after a rock that emerges from the sea and resembles a sleeping lion), also known as Moekeshiwan (Japanese: 萌消湾), is a volcano in the southern part of Iturup in the Kuril Islands, administered by Russia and claimed by Japan. The volcano is characterized by a large caldera that is flooded by the Sea of Okhotsk. A large eruption occurred early during the Holocene which reached a volcanic explosivity index of 7.

== Location ==
Iturup island contains about nine stratovolcanoes, some pyroclastic cones, one somma volcano and several geothermal fields. Among these, Lvinaya Past is formed by a 7-by-9-kilometre (4.3 mi × 5.6 mi) wide and 550-metre (1,800 ft) deep caldera, which is connected with the Sea of Okhotsk by a 5-kilometre (3.1 mi) wide and maximally 50-metre (160 ft) deep strait. The volcano is 528 metres (1,732 ft) high, almost 1 kilometre (0.62 mi) above the bottom of the caldera. The caldera lies close to the southernmost point of Iturup and is flanked to the east by the Urbich volcano and to the southwest by the Berutarube volcano. The isthmuses east and southwest of Lvinaya Past are covered by its eruption products.

== Series of eruptions ==
Large eruptions took place 13,000 and 12,300 years ago, and a major eruption occurred 7480 ± 80 BC. The submarine caldera formed during this eruption and heavily altered the topography on Iturup, generating an ignimbrite which joined the three southernmost volcanoes of Iturup to the main island. The total volume of tephra ejected amounts to 170 cubic kilometres (41 cu mi). This eruption had a volcanic explosivity index of 7, making it one of the largest eruptions that are known to have occurred in the Kuril Islands, and the strongest known to have occurred during the Holocene in the Southern Kurils.

== Younger Dryas eruptions and their impact ==
Ice cores taken in the Siberian Altai Mountains demonstrate increased sulfate concentrations at the time, possibly stemming from large sulfate release by the eruptions of Lvinaya Past and contemporaneous large scale activity at Caldera Fisher in Alaska and Pinatubo in the Philippines and may relate to the Younger Dryas event. Habitats may have been destroyed to distances of 50 kilometres (31 mi) from the volcano, and Iturup was devastated. The development of alder-containing birch forests in the region may have been favoured by the ash fall from the eruption, which would have killed more susceptible conifers. The impact of the eruption may have extended all the way to southern North America.

== Magma content ==
Lvinaya Past has erupted tholeiitic magmas with a low potassium content. Other rocks include andesite, basaltic andesite, basalt, dacite and picrite. The caldera-forming eruption ejected dacitic material with hornblende and quartz forming phenocrysts.

== Nearby volcanoes ==
Other volcanoes on Iturup include Astonupuri, Baransky, Berutarube, Bogatyr Ridge, Chirip, Demon, Golets-Tornyi, Grozny Group, Medvezhy and Past.

== See also ==
- List of volcanoes in Russia
