= Gorny Institute =

Stratovolcano located on the Sredinny range in Kamchatka, Russia

Gornyi Institute
- Горный Институт
- Location within Kamchatka Krai

Highest point
- Elevation: 2,125 m (6,972 ft)
- Coordinates: 57.20°N 160.11°E

Geography
- Location: Kamchatka, Russia
- Parent range: Sredinny Range

Geology
- Rock age: Late Quaternary Period
- Mountain type: Stratovolcano
- Last eruption: 1250 (?)

Gorny Institute (Russian: Горный Институт), also spelled Gornyi Institut, is a stratovolcano located in the Sredinny Range on Russia's Kamchatka Peninsula. It lies just east of the Titila volcano and north of the Kebeney volcano.

The volcano is named after the St. Petersburg State Mining Institute which was established by Catherine the Great to oversee the study of mining and mountain geology.

== See also ==
- List of volcanoes in Russia
