= Bliznets =

Stratovolcano in central Kamchatka

- Location within Kamchatka Krai

Highest point
- Elevation: 1,244 m (4,081 ft)
- Coordinates: 56.97°N 159.78°E

Geography
- Location: Kamchatka, Russia
- Parent range: Sredinny Range

Geology
- Mountain type: Stratovolcano
- Last eruption: Unknown

Bliznets (Russian: Близнец) is a stratovolcano in central Kamchatka. The volcano is situated on the crest of the central Sredinny Range south-west of Kebeney volcano.

== See also ==
- List of volcanoes in Russia
