= Pogranichny Volcano =

Shield volcano in central Kamchatka

Pogranichny

Highest point
- Elevation: 1,427 m (4,682 ft)
- Coordinates: 56.85°N 159.80°E

Geography
- Location: Kamchatka, Russia
- Parent range: Sredinny Range

Geology
- Mountain type: Shield volcano
- Last eruption: Unknown

Pogranichny (Russian: Пограничный) is a shield volcano in central Kamchatka. It is the highest and the easternmost among three shield volcanoes located north-east of Cherny volcano in the central Sredinny Range.

== See also ==
- List of volcanoes in Russia
