= Bolshaya Ipelka =

Massive shield volcano in southern Kamchatka

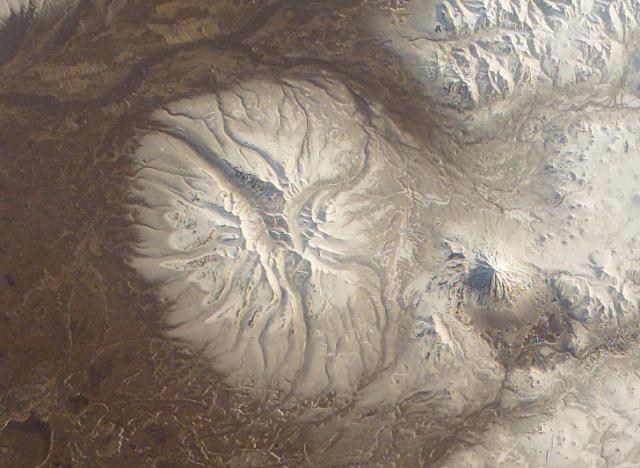
- Satellite image of Bolshaya Ipelka, with Opala being the small conical mountain to the right.

Highest point
- Elevation: 1,155 m (3,789 ft)
- Coordinates: 52.63°N 156.97°E

Geography
- Location within Kamchatka Krai
- Location: Kamchatka, Russia
- Parent range: Eastern Range

Geology
- Mountain type: Shield volcano
- Last eruption: Pleistocene

Bolshaya Ipelka (Russian: Большая Ипелька) is a massive shield volcano at the southern end of the Kamchatka Peninsula in Russia's Far East region. It represents the largest volcanic structure of southern Kamchatka Krai, covering an area measuring 32 km (20 mi) long and 42 km (26 mi) wide. Bolshaya Ipelka is of Pleistocene age and formed west of the main volcanic zone in southern Kamchatka. The shield volcano is now inactive, having last erupted during the Pleistocene epoch.

Bolshaya Ipelka is extensively eroded, having been dissected by deep valleys along its flanks that were formed as a result of glaciers flowing out from the summit during past glacial periods. The summit is the most severely eroded part of the original cone, which originally had a much higher elevation than its present 1,155 m (3,789 ft). By contrast, the neighbouring Opala stratovolcano has an uneroded form and is still volcanically active, having last erupted about 300 years ago.

== See also ==
- List of volcanoes in Russia
