= Kostakan =

North to South trending chain of Cinder cones in southern Kamchatka

- Location within Russia Location within Kamchatka Krai

Highest point
- Elevation: 1,150 m (3,770 ft)GVP
- Coordinates: 53.83°N 158.05°E

Geography
- Location: Kamchatka, Russia
- Parent range: Eastern Range

Geology
- Mountain type: Cinder cones
- Last eruption: 1350 (?) (GVP)

Kostakan (Russian: Костакан) is a north-south trending chain of cinder cones located in the southern part of the Kamchatka Peninsula, Russia.

== Geology ==
Volcanism of the Kostakan cones belongs to a pattern of basaltic volcanism that is recognized to the west of Kamchatka's Eastern Volcanic Zone (GVP).

The Kostakan cones are found south of Bakening volcano, from Kostakan Lake southward in a north-south lineament (GVP). They are associated with lava flows and maars. (Ponomareva et al. 2007). Some of these lava flows have lengths of more than 1 kilometre (0.62 mi) (Dorendorf et al. 2000). Zmeya crater formed inside a landslide scar and is the highest cone at 1,150 metres (3,770 ft) of altitude (GVP).

Activity commenced in the Pleistocene and continued on into the Holocene, with the latest eruption occurring perhaps 1350 at Glavny cone. Other eruptions occurred 1200, 1000, 800, 6550 BP and 8050 BP, with varying uncertainties (GVP).

Their composition ranges from basalt to basaltic andesite, with medium contents of potassium (Ponomareva et al. 2007).

== See also ==
- List of volcanoes in Russia
