= Kell (volcano) =

Small extinct stratovolcano in southeast Kamchatka

- Location within Kamchatka Krai

Highest point
- Elevation: 900 m (3,000 ft)
- Coordinates: 51.65°N 157.35°E

Geography
- Location: Kamchatka, Russia
- Parent range: Eastern Range

Geology
- Mountain type: Stratovolcano
- Last eruption: Unknown

Kell (Russian: Келля) is a small Pleistocene stratovolcano. It is located just north of the Zheltovsky volcano, within the Prizrak caldera on the southeast coast of the Kamchatka Peninsula in Russia.

Because of its remote and inaccessible location, most information about the volcano comes from aerial surveys. The volcano was discovered during an aerial survey in 1946.

The Prizrak caldera has a diameter of about 4 km (2.5 mi). It is located on top of the site of an ancient stratovolcano whose base has a diameter of about 10 km (6.2 mi). The slopes of the caldera feature a network of erosional valleys. Within the Prizrak caldera complex are at least three partially nested calderas, each about 3 to 5 km (1.9 to 3.1 mi) in diameter. Kell is the largest of several small stratovolcanoes, composed mainly of lava, in the innermost portion of the caldera. The caldera also contains lava domes.

The innermost caldera is thought to date from the Late Pleistocene. The activity of the volcano appears to have ceased in post-glacial time; there is no evidence of recent volcanism or hydrothermal activity.

== See also ==
- List of volcanoes in Russia
