= Anaun =

Stratovolcano on the Kamchatka peninsula, Russia

- Location within Kamchatka Krai

Highest point
- Elevation: 1,828 m (5,997 ft)
- Coordinates: 56.32°N 158.83°E

Geography
- Location: Kamchatka, Russia
- Parent range: Sredinny Range

Geology
- Mountain type: Stratovolcano
- Last eruption: Unknown

Anaun (Russian: Анаун) is a stratovolcano in central Kamchatka. The volcano is located to the north-east of Uksichan volcano in the southern Sredinny Range.

== See also ==
- List of volcanoes in Russia
