= Barkhatnaya Sopka =

Volcano located in the southern part of the Kamchatka peninsula, Russia

- Location within Kamchatka Krai

Highest point
- Elevation: 874 m (2,867 ft)
- Listing: Volcanoes of Russia
- Coordinates: 52°48′07″N 158°14′24″E

Geography
- Location: Kamchatka, Russia
- Parent range: Eastern Range

Geology
- Mountain type: Lava domes
- Last eruption: 3550 BCE

Barkhatnaya Sopka (Russian: Бархатная сопка, lit. 'Velvet Hill') is a volcano located in the southern part of Kamchatka Peninsula, Russia, along the Paratunka River. The mountain complex is named by the red-velvety color of its volcanic deposits.
