= Voyampolsky =

Shield volcano in the northern part of the Kamchatka peninsula, Russia

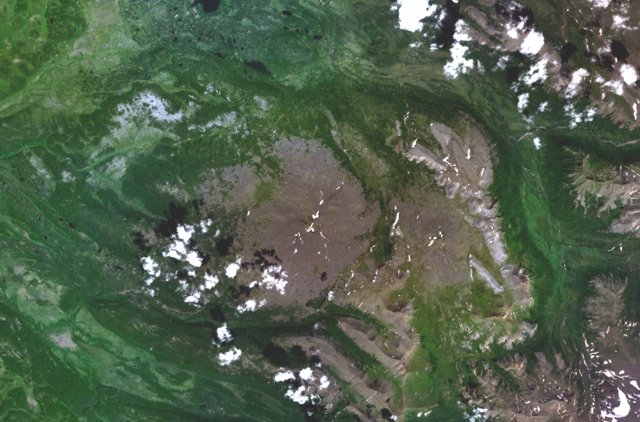
- Satellite view of volcano Voyampolsky.

Highest point
- Elevation: 1,103 m (3,619 ft)
- Coordinates: 58.37°N 160.62°E

Geography
- Location within Kamchatka Krai Location within Russia
- Location: Kamchatka, Russia
- Parent range: Sredinny Range

Geology
- Mountain type: Shield volcanoes
- Last eruption: Unknown

Voyampolsky (Russian: Воямпольский) is a volcano located in the northern part of the Kamchatka Peninsula, Russia. It is composed of two shield volcanoes, Voyampolsky and Kakhtana. Voyampolsky is the highest one. Headwaters of the Kakhtana River are located nearby.

== See also ==
- List of volcanoes in Russia
