= Khuvkhoitun =

Mountain in Kamchatka Peninsula, Russia

Khuvkoitun
- Location within Kamchatka Krai

Highest point
- Elevation: 2,616 m (8,583 ft)
- Prominence: 1,920 m (6,300 ft)
- Listing: Ultra, Ribu
- Coordinates: 57°55′15″N 160°40′33″E

Geography
- Location: Kamchatka, Russia
- Parent range: Middle Range

Geology
- Mountain type: Stratovolcano

Khuvkhoitun (Russian: Хувхойтун) sometimes referred to as Gora Khuvkhoitun is a stratovolcano located on Russia's Kamchatka Peninsula. The mountain reaches 2,616 m in elevation above sea level.

== See also ==
- List of ultras of Northeast Asia
- List of volcanoes in Russia
