= Golaya =

Small stratovolcano in southern Kamchatka

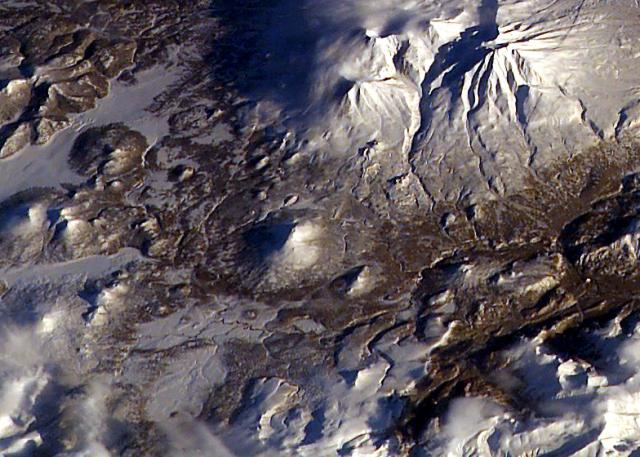
- Golaya seen from space

Highest point
- Elevation: 858 m (2,815 ft)
- Coordinates: 52.263°N 157.787°E

Geography
- Location within Kamchatka Krai
- Location: Kamchatka, Russia
- Parent range: Eastern Range

Geology
- Mountain type: Stratovolcano
- Last eruption: Unknown

Golaya (Russian: Голая - bare) is a small stratovolcano located in the southern part of the Kamchatka Peninsula, Russia.

== See also ==
- List of volcanoes in Russia
