= Vernadskii Ridge =

Mountain in Russia

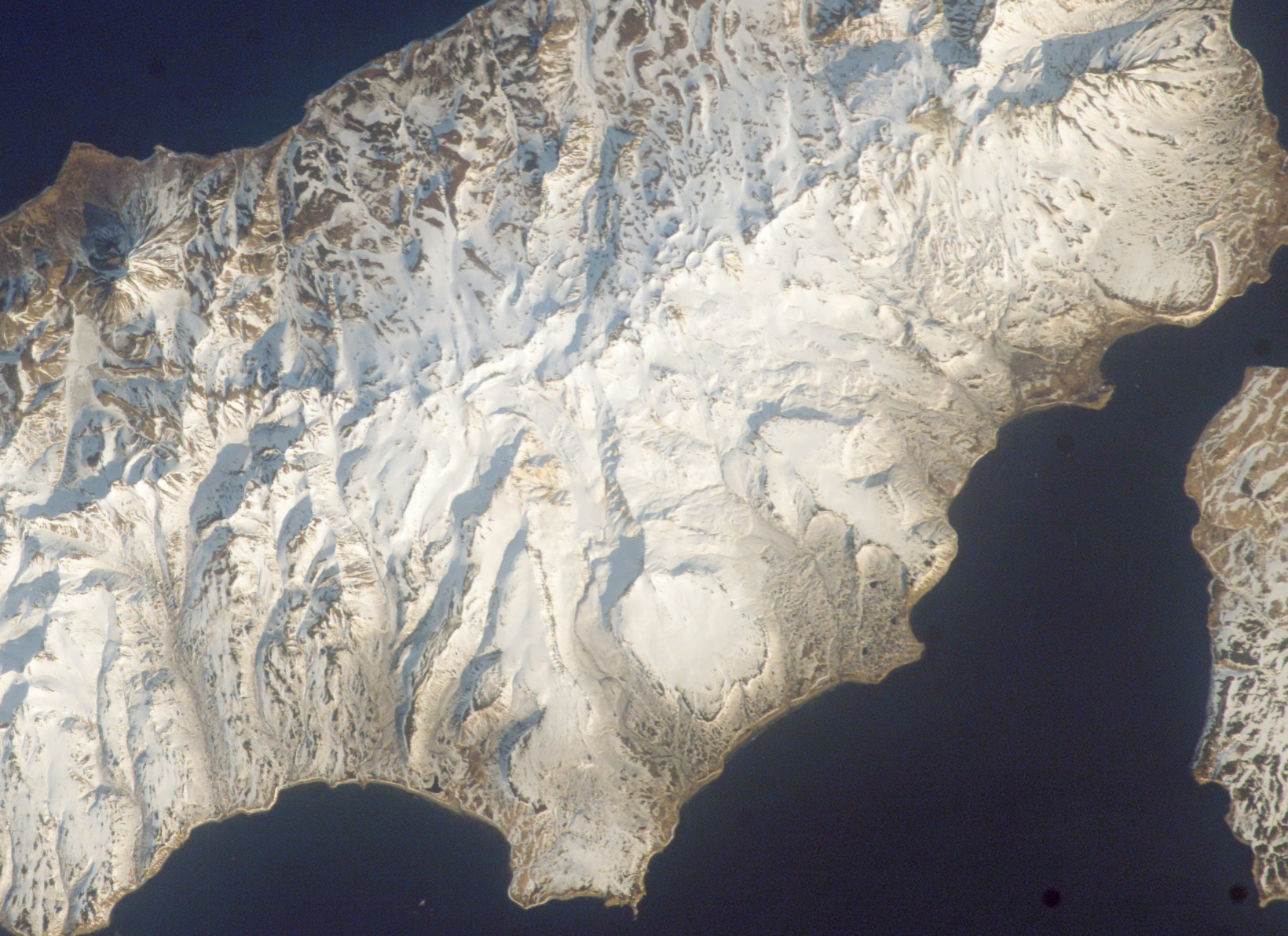

Highest point
- Elevation: 1,183 m (3,881 ft)
- Coordinates: 50.55°N 155.97°E

Geography
- Location within Far Eastern Federal District
- Location: Paramushir, Kuril Islands, Russia

Geology
- Mountain type: Volcanic group of Cinder cones
- Last eruption: Unknown

Vernadskii Ridge (Russian: Хребет Вернадского) is a volcanic group located in the northern part of Paramushir Island, Kuril Islands, Russia. It is named after Russian scientist Vladimir Vernadsky. The Vernadskii Ridge together with Ebeko is one of the volcanoes on Paramushir that have erupted after the last glacial age, and both of them form one of Paramushir's volcanic ridges; during the last ice age glaciers from the Vernadskii Ridge merged the island with Shumshu island. A hydrothermal system is associated with the Vernadskii Ridge, which has temperatures of 180–260 °C (356–500 °F). Metasomatic alteration of country rock has taken place.

== See also ==
- List of volcanoes in Russia
