= Eggella =

Shield volcano in central Kamchatka

- Location within Kamchatka Krai

Highest point
- Elevation: 1,046 m (3,432 ft)
- Coordinates: 56.57°N 158.52°E

Geography
- Location: Kamchatka, Russia
- Parent range: Sredinny Range

Geology
- Mountain type: Shield volcano
- Last eruption: Unknown

Eggella (Russian: Эггелла) is a shield volcano in central Kamchatka. The volcano is located on the west axis of the southern Sredinny Range.

== See also ==
- List of volcanoes in Russia
