= Belenkaya =

Stratovolcano in southern Kamchatka, Russia

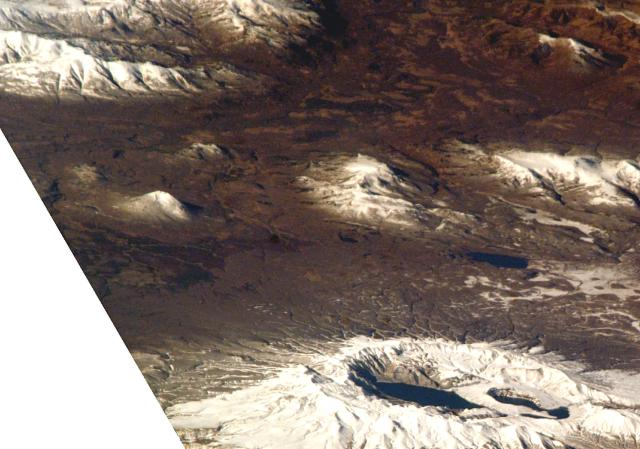

Highest point
- Elevation: 892 m (2,927 ft)
- Listing: Volcanoes of Russia
- Coordinates: 51°45′N 157°16′E

Geography
- Location within Kamchatka Krai
- Location: Kamchatka, Russia
- Parent range: Eastern Range

Geology
- Mountain type: Stratovolcano
- Last eruption: Pleistocene

Belenkaya (Russian: Беленькая) is a basaltic stratovolcano that is located in the southern part of Kamchatka Peninsula, Kamchatka Krai, Russia. It is a part of the Eastern Range. It is small and conical with an elevation of around 892 meters (2,927 ft).

This volcano's last known eruption occurred during the Pleistocene epoch. There are no known eruptions from the Holocene epoch.
