= Yelovsky =

Yelovsky (masculine), Yelovskaya (feminine), or Yelovskoye (neuter) may refer to:

- Yelovsky District, a district of Perm Krai, Russia
- Yelovsky (volcano), a shield volcano in Russia
