= Cherpuk Group =

Two cinder cones in Russia

- Location within Kamchatka Krai

Highest point
- Elevation: 1,868 m (6,129 ft)
- Coordinates: 55.55°N 157.47°E

Geography
- Location: Kamchatka, Russia
- Parent range: Middle Range

Geology
- Mountain type: Cinder cones
- Last eruption: 4550 BCE (?)

Cherpuk Group (Russian: Черпук) is a group of two cinder cones located in the central part of Kamchatka Peninsula, Russia. It is a group of a few mostly dormant cinder cones.

== See also ==
- List of volcanoes in Russia
