= Mashkovtsev =

Mashkovtsev may refer to:

- Vladilen Mashkovtsev (1929—1997) — Russian writer
- Mashkovtsev (volcano) — volcano in Kamchatka (Russia)
