= Romanovka stratovolcano =

Volcano on the Kamchatkan Peninsula within the country of Russia

Romanovka

Highest point
- Elevation: 1,442 m (4,731 ft)
- Coordinates: 55.65°N 158.80°E

Geography
- Location: Kamchatka, Russia
- Parent range: Sredinny Range

Geology
- Mountain type: Stratovolcano
- Last eruption: Unknown

Romanovka (Russian: Романовка) is a stratovolcano in central Kamchatka. The volcano is located at the north of Kozyrevka River in the southern Sredinny Range.

== See also ==
- List of volcanoes in Russia
