= Bolshoy Kekuknaysky =

Volcano located on the central part of Kamchatka

- Location within Kamchatka Krai

Highest point
- Elevation: 1,401 m (4,596 ft)
- Coordinates: 56.47°N 157.80°E

Geography
- Location: Kamchatka, Russia
- Parent range: Middle Range

Geology
- Mountain type: Shield volcanoes
- Last eruption: 5310 BCE ± 100 years

Bolshoy Kekuknaysky (Russian: Большой Кекукнайский) is a volcano located in the central part of the Kamchatka Peninsula, Russia. It comprises two shield volcanoes: Bolshoy (1301 m) and Kekuknaysky (1401 m). Their lava flows and cinder cones have dammed a valley dissecting the mountain, creating the Bolshoye Goltsovoye and Maloye Goltsovoe lakes. The last eruption occurred at Kekuk Crater, about 7,200 years ago.

== See also ==
- List of volcanoes in Russia
