= Srednego Strait =

Strait

Coordinates: 47°36′N 152°55′E

Srednego Strait (Russian: Proliv Srednego; Japanese: Suride Kaikyo) is a strait that separates the islands of Rasshua and Ushishir. It is about 14.5 km (about 9 mi) wide. The strait is obstructed by several rocks and reefs and has tidal currents that reach four knots and create heavy tide rips, reportedly making it the most dangerous passage for vessel traffic in the Kuril Island chain.
