= Shishel =

Volcano in Kamchatka Peninsula, Russia

- Location within Kamchatka Krai

Highest point
- Elevation: 2,525 m (8,284 ft)
- Prominence: 1,328 m (4,357 ft)
- Coordinates: 57.45°N 160.37°E

Geography
- Location: Kamchatka, Russia
- Parent range: Sredinny Range

Geology
- Mountain type: Shield volcano
- Last eruption: Unknown

Shishel (Russian: Шишель) is an extinct shield volcano located in the northern part of Kamchatka Peninsula, Russia.

== See also ==
- List of volcanoes in Russia
