= Alngey =

Stratovolcano in central Kamchatka, Russia

Highest point
- Elevation: 1,853 m (6,079 ft)
- Coordinates: 57.70°N 160.40°E

Geography
- Location: Kamchatka, Russia
- Parent range: Sredinny Range

Geology
- Mountain type: Stratovolcano
- Last eruption: Unknown

Alngey (Russian: Алнгей) is a stratovolcano in central Kamchatka. The volcano is located to the east of the shield volcano Tekletunup and to the west of the crest of the northern Sredinny Range.

== See also ==
- List of volcanoes in Russia
