= Akhtang =

Shield volcano topped by a small stratovolcano in Kamchatka

- Location within Far Eastern Federal District Location within Kamchatka Krai

Highest point
- Elevation: 1,956 m (6,417 ft)
- Coordinates: 55°26′N 158°39′E

Geography
- Location: Kamchatka, Russia
- Parent range: Sredinny Range

Geology
- Rock age: Holocene
- Mountain type: Stratovolcano
- Last eruption: unknown

Akhtang (Russian: Ахтанг) is a shield volcano topped by a small basaltic stratovolcano located in the Sredinny Range on the Kamchatka Peninsula, Russia southeast of the Ichinsky volcano.

== See also ==
- List of volcanoes in Russia
