= Bely (volcano) =

Basaltic shield volcano in Kamchatka, Russia

- Location within Kamchatka Krai

Highest point
- Elevation: 2,080 m (6,820 ft)
- Coordinates: 57.88°N 160.53°E

Geography
- Location: Kamchatka, Russia
- Parent range: Sredinny Range

Geology
- Mountain type: Shield volcano
- Last eruption: Unknown

Bely (Russian: Белый вулкан, lit. "white volcano") is a basaltic shield volcano in central Kamchatka. The volcano is located in the northern Sredinny Range.

== See also ==
- List of volcanoes in Russia
