= Tuzovskiy =

Tuzovskiy (Russian: Тузо́вский), sometimes transliterated as Tuzovsky may refer to:

- Tuzovskiy (volcano), Russia
- Roman Tuzovskiy (born 1985), Russian footballer
