= Verkhovoy =

Mountain in Kamchatka Peninsula, Russia

Highest point
- Elevation: 1,400+ metres (4,593 feet)
- Coordinates: 56.52°N 159.53°E

Geography
- Location: Kamchatka, Russia
- Parent range: Sredinny Range

Geology
- Mountain type: Shield volcano
- Last eruption: Unknown

Verkhovoy (Russian: Верховой) is a shield volcano located in the northern part of Kamchatka Peninsula, Russia.

== See also ==
- List of volcanoes in Russia
