= Asacha =

Complex volcanoes in southern Kamchatka, Russia

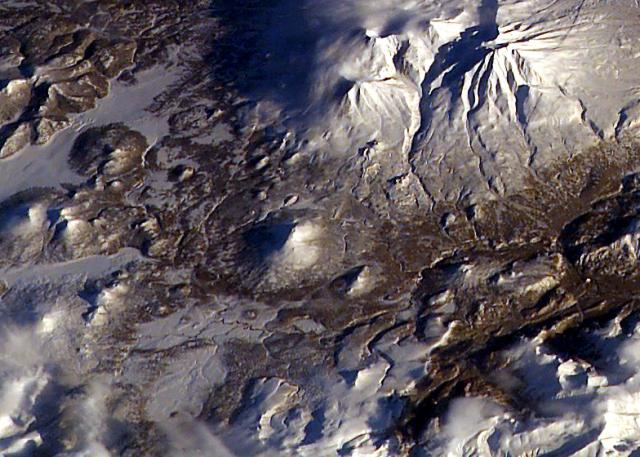
- Satelitní snímek Asači (vpravo nahoře).

Highest point
- Elevation: 1,910 m (6,270 ft)
- Prominence: 1,220 m (4,000 ft)
- Listing: Volcanoes of Russia, Ribu
- Coordinates: 52.355°N 157.827°E

Geography
- Location within Kamchatka Krai
- Location: Kamchatka, Russia
- Parent range: Eastern Range

Geology
- Mountain type: Complex volcano
- Last eruption: Unknown

Asacha (Russian: Асача) is a complex volcano located in the southern part of Kamchatka Peninsula, Russia.
