= Maly Payalpan =

Shield volcano in central Kamchatka, Russia

- Location within Kamchatka Krai

Highest point
- Elevation: 1,802 m (5,912 ft)
- Coordinates: 55.82°N 157.98°E

Geography
- Location: Kamchatka, Russia
- Parent range: Sredinny Range

Geology
- Mountain type: Shield volcano
- Last eruption: Unknown

Maly Payalpan (Russian: Малый Паялпан) is a shield volcano located in the central part of Kamchatka Peninsula, Russia.

== See also ==
- List of volcanoes in Russia
