= Karymshina =

Large caldera located in the southern part of Kamchatka, Russia

- Location within Kamchatka Krai

Highest point
- Elevation: 1,300 m (4,300 ft)
- Coordinates: 52°24′N 158°00′E

Geography
- Location: Kamchatka Peninsula, Russia
- Parent range: Eastern Range

Geology
- Rock age: 1.5 Ma
- Mountain type: Caldera
- Last eruption: 1.5 Ma

Karymshina is a large volcanic caldera located in the southern Kamchatka Peninsula of Russia. It was discovered in 2006 by Vladimir L Leonov and Aleksey N. Rogozin.

== Location ==
Karymshima is located about 50 km southwest of Petropavlovsk-Kamchatsky. Although it is towards the east side of Kamchatka, it is on Kamchatka's watershed, with rivers flowing to both the west and east coast.

== Description ==
Karymshina is a volcanic caldera. There is little to see on the ground since due to the volcano's great age (1.2-1.5 million years), it has been eroded and covered by younger lava flows from other volcanoes. The caldera measures about 25 km x 15 km. The highest point is Mount Tolstyi at 1,300 m. In the northwest of the caldera, there is an uplifted block, indicating an abortive eruption since forming. At present, the caldera floor is dry, but in the past it contained a lake that has left a sandstone layer. There are thermal springs, apparently heated by a large magma chamber that is still warm.

== Eruptive history ==
The earliest known eruption occurred about 1.5 million years ago. Although it is difficult to estimate ejecta volume due to erosion and more recent activity covering this eruptions ejecta, an estimate of ejecta volume has been produced by the discoverers, i.e. ~ 825 cubic km. After this eruption, an uplifted block formed. Rhyolite domes have also formed around the rim, about 500-800,000 years ago.

== See also ==
- List of volcanoes in Russia
- Volcanoes of Kamchatka
