= Snegovoy =

Shield volcano in northern Kamchatka, Russia

- Location within Kamchatka Krai

Highest point
- Elevation: 2,169 m (7,116 ft)
- Coordinates: 58.20°N 160.97°E

Geography
- Location: Kamchatka, Russia
- Parent range: Sredinny Range

Geology
- Mountain type: Shield volcano
- Last eruption: Unknown

Snegovoy (Russian: Снеговой, meaning "snowy") is a shield volcano located in the northern part of the Kamchatka Peninsula, Russia.

== See also ==
- List of volcanoes in Russia
