= Titila =

Shield volcano in Kamchatka Peninsula, Russia

- Location within Kamchatka Krai

Highest point
- Elevation: 1,523 m (4,997 ft)
- Coordinates: 57.40°N 160.10°E

Geography
- Location: Kamchatka, Russia
- Parent range: Sredinny Range

Geology
- Mountain type: Shield volcanoes
- Last eruption: 550 BCE (?)

Titila (Russian: Титила) is a shield volcano located in the northern part of Kamchatka Peninsula, Russia. It comprises two shield volcanoes: Titila and Rassoshina, from which Titila is the higher one.

== See also ==
- List of volcanoes in Russia
