= Ketoy =

Uninhabited island in the Kuril Island chain

Native name: Кетой (Russian); 計吐夷島 (Japanese)
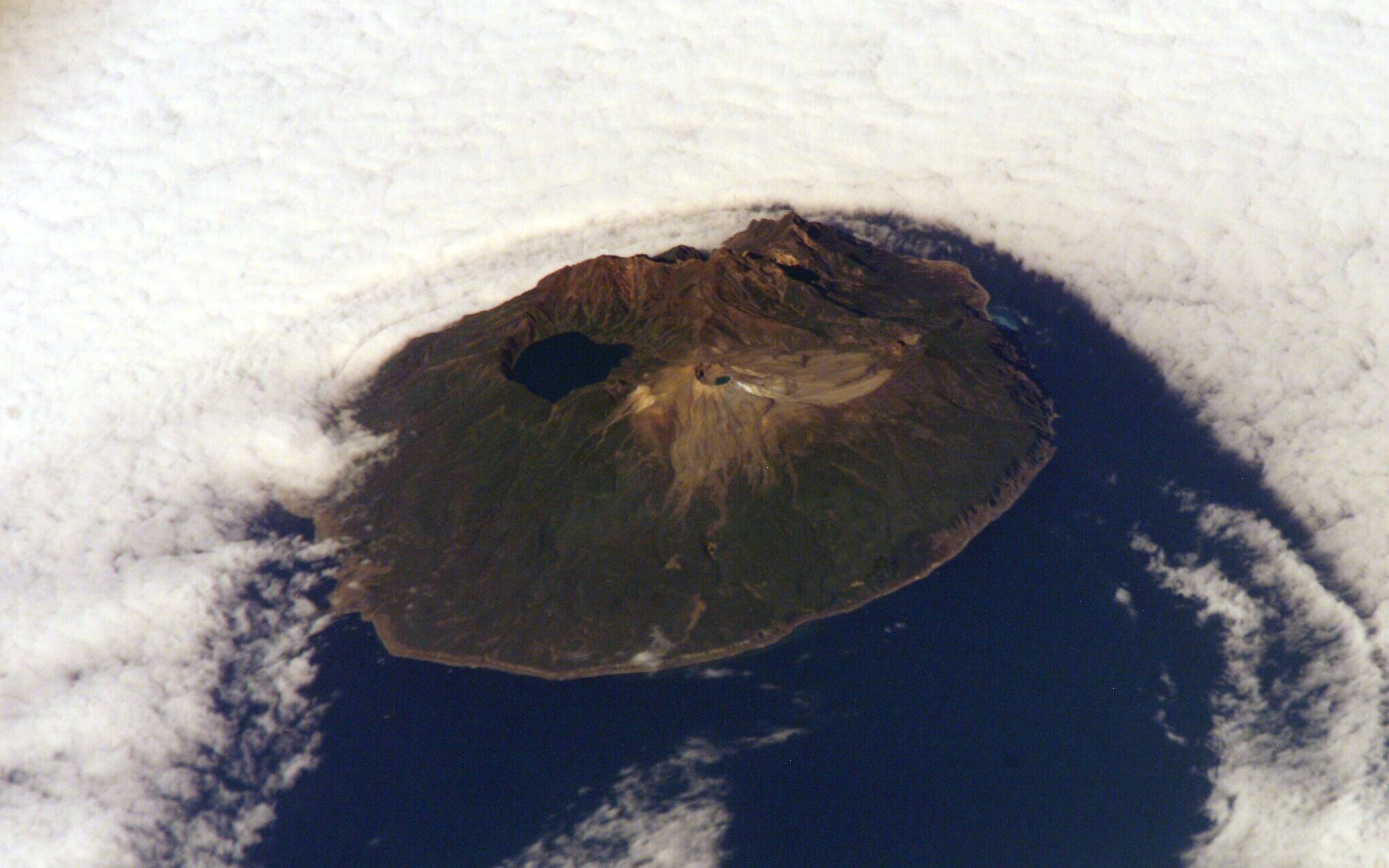
- Oblique astronaut photograph of Ketoy, with both crater lakes visible

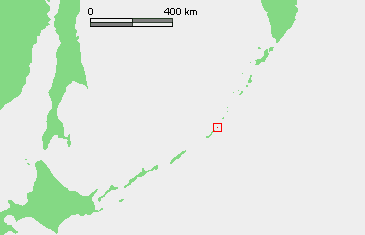

Geography
- Location: Sea of Okhotsk
- Coordinates: 47.35°N 152.475°E
- Archipelago: Kuril Islands
- Area: 73 km^{2} (28 sq mi)
- Highest elevation: 1,172 m (3845 ft)
- Highest point: Ketoy

Administration
- Russia

Demographics
- Population: 0
- Ethnic groups: Ainu (formerly)

Ketoy or Ketoi (Russian: Кетой; Japanese: 計吐夷島, romanized: Ketoi-tō) is an uninhabited volcanic island located in the centre of the Kuril Islands chain in the Sea of Okhotsk in the northwest Pacific Ocean. Its name is derived from the Ainu language for "skeleton" or "bad".

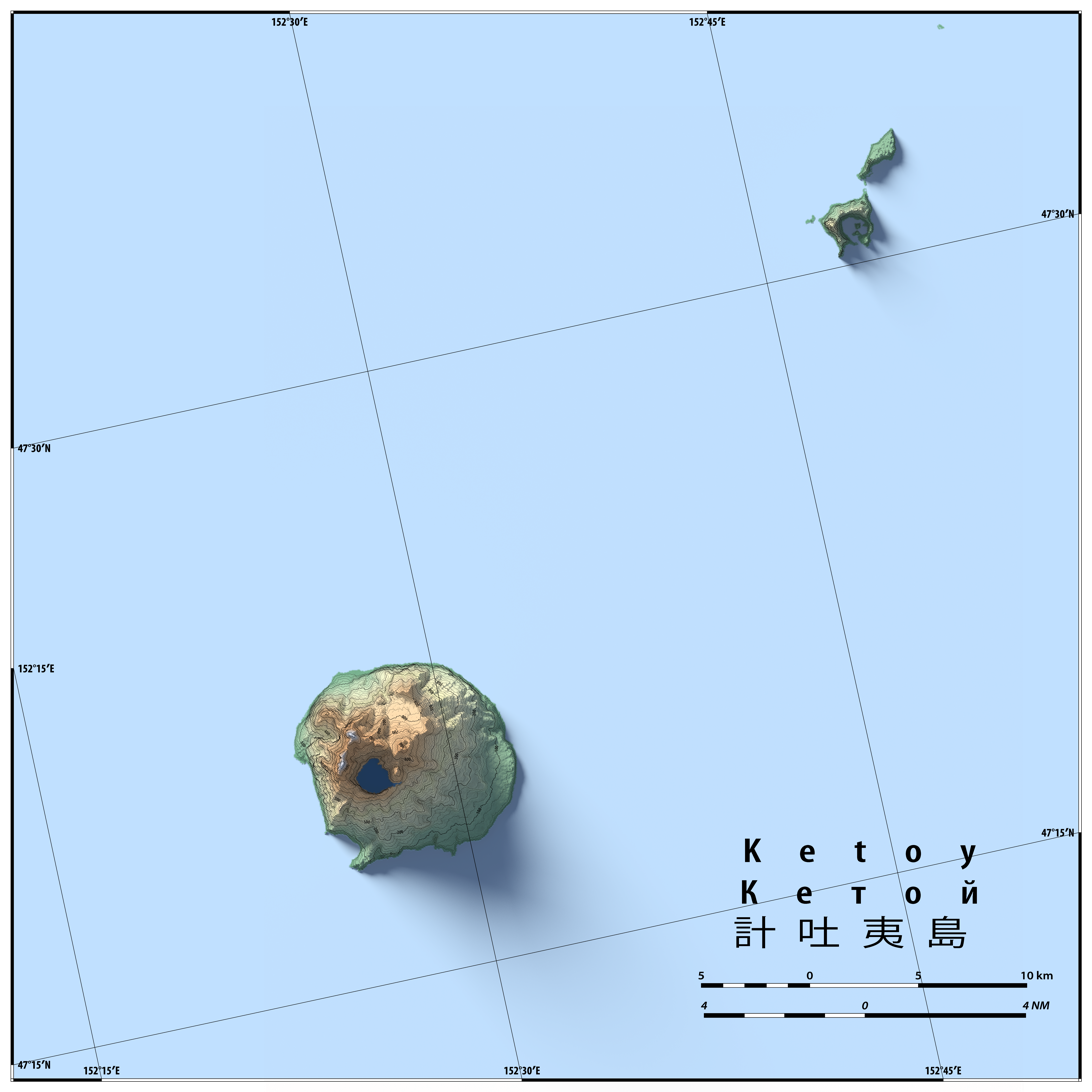
Topographic map of Ketoy

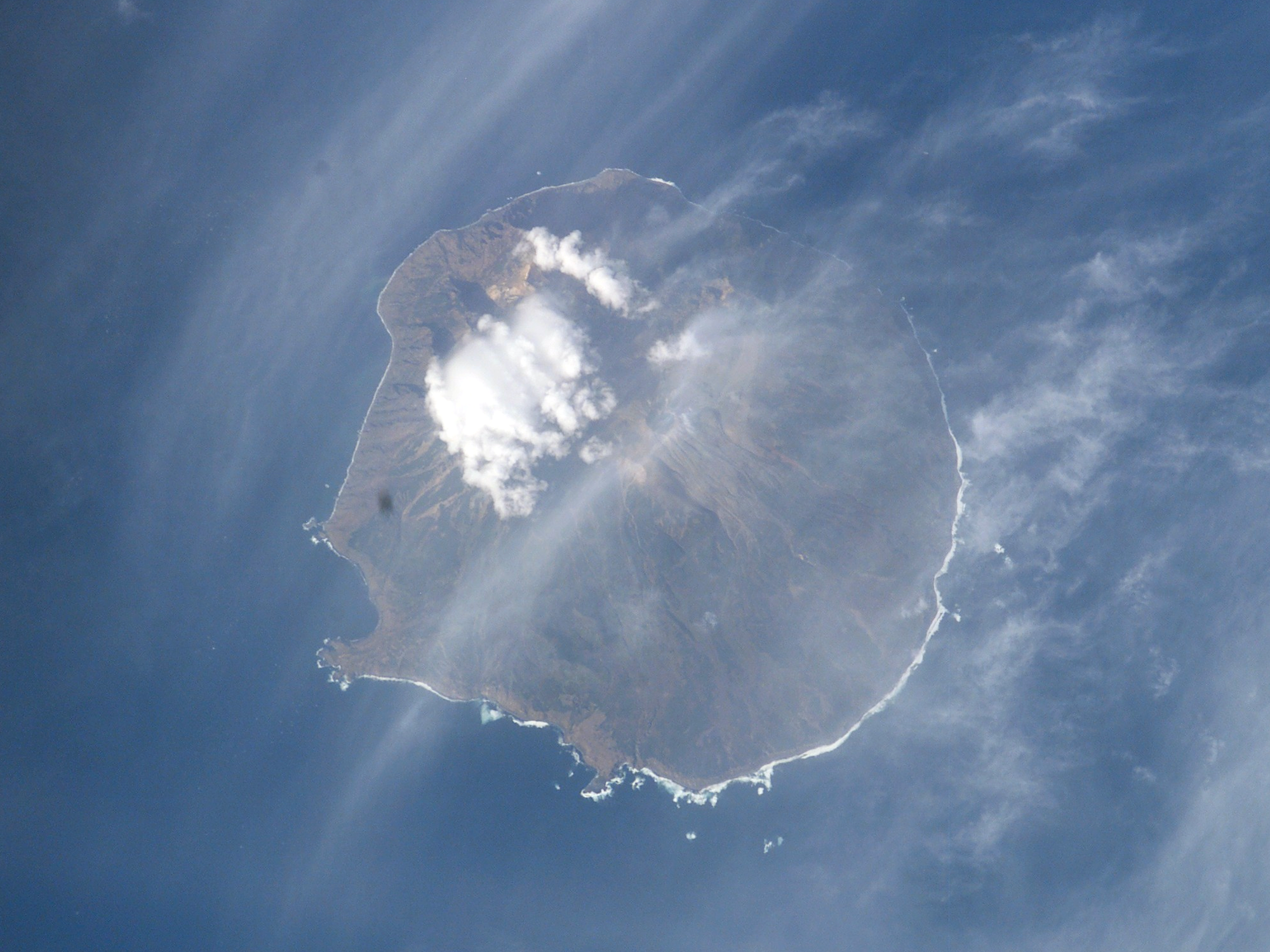
Astronaut photograph of Ketoy from the International Space Station

== Geography ==
The shape of the island is almost circular: approximately 10 km in length by approximately 9 km in width, with an area of 71.25 square kilometres (27.51 sq mi) The length of the coastline is 38.3 kilometers. Despite its relatively small area, the island has much landscape diversity, which is explained by its complex geomorphology, in which there are stratovolcanic cones, calderas, lava flows, volcanic plateaus, various valleys, high and steep coastal ledges, sea terraces, and rocky beaches. The steep cliffs ranging from 30 metres to 60 metres on the east and south sides with the west and north being taller. The beaches on the island consist of boulders and stones. The rivers and streams are numerous: mostly flowing to the south and east. The terrain is undulating and steep with numerous hills, rising to two main peaks:

The highest point is Mount Ketoy (Russian: влк Кетой; Japanese 計吐夷岳; Ketoidake) with a height of 1,172 meters to the east of the 1.5 km wide freshwater crater lake. The lake is 110 meters deep, and is the source of the Stochny Creek, which flows into the Pacific Ocean; the surface of the lake is at an altitude of 667 meters. The waters of thermal springs at the lake contain strontium, which makes them potentially interesting for the metallurgical industry.

The second peak is Pallas -(Russian: влк Палласа; Japanese 白烟山; Shirokemuriyama) with a height of 993 meters in the center of the island, which is still an active volcano. A major eruption occurred from 1846 to 1847, with the last known eruption in 1960. Eruptions of uncertainty occurred in 2013 and 2018. Pallas also has a crater lake, Lake Glazok, about 300 meters wide and 40 meters deep, with acidic water.

== History ==
Ketoy had no permanent habitation prior to European contact, but was visited in summer by the Ainu tribes from Rasshua for hunting. Members of the Russian expedition who visited the island in 1811, found the remains of a wooden cross with the word "God", which was presented as evidence of the gradual Christianization and Russification of the Ainu; however, a census in 1831 found no permanent inhabitants. Claimed by the Empire of Russia, sovereignty was passed to the Empire of Japan per the Treaty of Saint Petersburg along with the rest of the Kuril islands. The island was formerly administered as part of Shimushiro District of Nemuro Subprefecture of Hokkaidō. After World War II, the island came under the control of the Soviet Union, and is now administered as part of the Sakhalin Oblast of the Russian Federation.

== See also ==
- List of volcanoes in Russia
