= Mezhdusopochny =

Shield volcano in the central Kamchatka peninsula

Mezhdusponchy
- Location within Russia

Highest point
- Elevation: 1,641 m (5,384 ft)
- Listing: Ultra
- Coordinates: 57°47′N 160°25′E

Geography
- Location: Kamchatka Peninsula, Russia

Geology
- Mountain type: Shield volcano
- Last eruption: Unknown

Climbing
- Easiest route: climbing

Mezhdusopochny is a snow-capped shield volcano in the central Kamchatka Peninsula. The volcano has shown rare activity since 1292. The volcano's proximity is covered with other volcanoes and cinder cones.

== See also ==
- List of volcanoes in Russia
