= List of volcanoes in Russia =

This is a list of active and extinct volcanoes in Russia.

== European Russia ==
| Name | Elevation (m) | Elevation (ft) | Coordinates | Area | Last eruption |
|---|---|---|---|---|---|
| Kazbek | 5033 | 16,512 | 42.51°N 44.31°E | Caucasus Mountains | 750 BC |
| Elbrus | 5642 | 18,510 | 43.33°N 42.45°E | Caucasus Mountains | 50 AD |

== Kamchatka ==
Volcanoes of the Kamchatka Peninsula of the northwestern Pacific Ocean and the Russian Far East.

| Name | Elevation (m) | Elevation (ft) | Coordinates | Last eruption |
|---|---|---|---|---|
| Akademia Nauk | 1180 | 3871 | 53.98°N 159.45°E | 1996 |
| Akhtang | 1956 | 6417 | 55.43°N 158.65°E | Holocene |
| Alney-Chashakondzha | 2598 | 8534 | 56.70°N 159.65°E | 1050 BC ± 1000 years |
| Alngey | 1853 | 6079 | 57.70°N 160.40°E | Holocene |
| Anaun | 1828 | 5997 | 56.32°N 158.83°E | Holocene |
| Asacha | 1910 | 6256 | 52.355°N 157.827°E | Holocene |
| Atlasova | 1764 | 5787 | 57.97°N 160.65°E | Holocene |
| Avachinsky | 2741 | 8990 | 53.255°N 158.830°E | 2001 |
| Bakening | 2278 | 7474 | 53.905°N 158.07°E | 550 BC |
| Barkhatnaya Sopka | 870 | 2854 | 52.823°N 158.27°E | 3550 BC |
| Belenkaya | 892 | 2926 | 51.75°N 157.27°E | Holocene |
| Bely (volcano) | 2080 | 6824 | 57.88°N 160.53°E | Holocene |
| Bezymianny | 2882 | 9453 | 55.97°N 160.58°E | 2024 (continuing) |
| Bliznets | 1244 | 4081 | 56.97°N 159.78°E | Holocene |
| Bolshaya Ipelka | 1154 | 3785 | 52.67°N 156.9°E | - |
| Bolshe-Bannaya | 1200 | 3937 | 52.90°N 157.78°E | - |
| Bolshoi Payalpan | 1906 | 6253 | 55.88°N 157.78°E | - |
| Bolshoy Semyachik | 1720 | 5642 | 54.32°N 160.02°E | - |
| Bolshoy Kekuknaysky | 1401 | 4596 | 56.47°N 157.80°E | Holocene |
| Cherny | 1778 | 5833 | 56.82°N 159.67°E | Holocene |
| Cherpuk Group | 1868 | 6129 | 55.55°N 157.47°E | - |
| Diky Greben | 1331 | 4366 | 51.43°N 156.93°E | 350 AD ± 300 years |
| Dzenzursky | 2285 | 7497 | 53.637°N 158.922°E | Holocene |
| Eggella | 1046 | 3432 | 56.57°N 158.52°E | Holocene |
| Fedotych | 965 | 3166 | 57.13°N 160.40°E | Holocene |
| Gamchen | 2576 | 8449 | 54.97°N 160.68°E | - |
| Geodesistoy | 1170 | 3839 | 56.33°N 158.67°E | Holocene |
| Golaya | 858 | 2815 | 52.263°N 157.787°E | Holocene |
| Gorely | 1829 | 6000 | 52.56°N 158.03°E | 2013 |
| Gorny Institute | 2125 | 6972 | 57.33°N 160.20°E | Holocene |
| Ichinsky | 3621 | 11,880 | 55.68°N 157.73°E | 1740 |
| Iettunup | 1340 | 4396 | 58.40°N 161.08°E | Holocene |
| Iktunup | 2300 | 7546 | 58.08°N 160.77°E | Holocene |
| Ilyinsky | 1578 | 5176 | 51.49°N 157.20°E | 1901 |
| Kaileney | 1578 | 5176 | 51.49°N 157.20°E | - |
| Kambalny | 2156 | 7072 | 51.30°N 156.87°E | 2017 |
| Kamen (volcano) | 4582 | 15,043 | 52.24°N 158.00°E | - |
| Karymshina | 1486 | 4874 | 54.1°N 159.4°E | 1.5 Ma |
| Karymsky | 1486 | 4874 | 54.1°N 159.4°E | 2025 May 2 (continuing non-stop) |
| Kebeney | 1527 | 5010 | 57.10°N 159.93°E | Holocene |
| Kekurny | 1377 | 4518 | 56.40°N 158.85°E | Holocene |
| Kell | 900 | 2953 | 51.65°N 157.35°E | Holocene |
| Khangar | 2000 | 6562 | 54.75°N 157.38°E | - |
| Khodutka | 2090 | 6857 | 52.063°N 157.703°E | - |
| Khuvkhoitun | 2616 | 8583 | 57°55′N 160°41′E | - |
| Kikhpinych | 1552 | 5092 | 54.489°N 160.253°E | 1550 |
| Kizimen | 2376 | 7795 | 55.130°N 160.32°E | 2013 |
| Klyuchevskaya Sopka | 4790 | 15,715 | 56.0°N 160.5°E | 2025 May 2 (continuing) |
| Komarov | 2070 | 6791 | 55.032°N 160.720°E | 450 |
| Koryaksky | 3456 | 11,340 | 53.320°N 158.688°E | 2008 |
| Koshelev | 1812 | 5943 | 51.357°N 156.75°E | - |
| Kostakan | 1150 | 3773 | 53.83°N 158.06°E | 1360 |
| Kozyrevsky | 2016 | 6614 | 55.58°N 158.38°E | Holocene |
| Krainy | 1554 | 5098 | 56.37°N 159.03°E | Holocene |
| Krasheninnikov | 2025 | 6089 | 54.593°N 160.273°E | 2025 August 3 (Currently/actively erupting) |
| Kronotsky | 3528 | 11,572 | 54.9°N 160.52°E | 1923 |
| Ksudach | 1079 | 3539 | 51.80°N 157.53°E | 1907 |
| Kulkev | 915 | 3002 | 56.37°N 158.37°E | Holocene |
| Kurile Lake | 81 | 266 | 51.345°N 157.312°E | 6440 BC |
| Leutongey | 1333 | 4373 | 57.30°N 159.83°E | Holocene |
| Maly Payalpan | 1802 | 5912 | 55.82°N 157.98°E | Holocene |
| Maly Semyachik | 1560 | 5118 | 54.13°N 159.67°E | 1952 |
| Mashkovtsev | 503 | 1650 | 51.10°N 156.72°E | - |
| Mezhdusopochny | 1641 | 5384 | 57.47°N 160.25°E | Holocene |
| Mutnovsky | 2322 | 7616 | 52.45°N 158.19°E | 2000 |
| Olkhovy | 636 | 2234 | 52.077°N 157.477°E | Holocene |
| Opala | 2475 | 8118 | 52.54°N 157.34°E | 1776 CE |
| Ostanets | 719 | 2359 | 52.146°N 157.322°E | Holocene |
| Ostry | 2552 | 8373 | 58.18°N 160.82°E | - |
| Otdelniy | 791 | 2595 | 52.220°N 157.428°E | Holocene |
| Ozernoy | 562 | 1844 | 51.88°N 157.38°E | Holocene |
| Pauzhetka | 1331 | 4366 | 51.43°N 156.9°E | - |
| Piratkovsky | 1322 | 4337 | 52.113°N 157.849°E | Holocene |
| Plosky | 1236 | 4055 | 55.20°N 158.47°E | - |
| Pogranychny | 1427 | 4682 | 56.85°N 159.80°E | Holocene |
| Romanovka | 1442 | 4731 | 55.65°N 158.80°E | Holocene |
| Schmidt | 2020 | 6627 | 54.92°N 160.63°E | - |
| Sedankinsky | 1241 | 4071 | 57.23°N 160.08°E | Holocene |
| Severny (volcano) | 1936 | 6352 | 58.28°N 160.87°E | Holocene |
| Shishel | 2525 | 8284 | 57.45°N 160.37°E | Holocene |
| Shiveluch | 2444 | 8028 | 55.38°N 161.19°E | 2025 (continuing non-stop) |
| Snegovoy | 2169 | 7116 | 58.20°N 160.97°E | Holocene |
| Snezhniy | 2169 | 7116 | 58.02°N 160.75°E | Holocene |
| Soboliny | 1560 | 5117 | 54.13°N 159.67°E | - |
| Spokoyny | 2171 | 7123 | 58.13°N 160.82°E | 3450 BC |
| Taunshits | 2353 | 7720 | 54.53°N 159.80°E | 550 BC |
| Titila | 1559 | 5115 | 57.40°N 160.11°E | Holocene |
| Tolbachik | 3682 | 12,080 | 55.830°N 160.330°E | 2013 |
| Tolmachev Volcano | 1415 | | 52.5518°N 157.7329°E | Holocene |
| Tundroviy | 739 | 2425 | 52.25°N 157.60°E | Holocene |
| Tuzovsky | 1533 | 5029 | 57.32°N 159.97°E | Holocene |
| Udina | 2923 | 9590 | 55.755°N 160.527°E | - |
| Uka | 1643 | 5390 | 57.70°N 160.58°E | Holocene |
| Uksichan | 1692 | 5551 | 56.08°N 158.38°E | Holocene |
| Ushkovsky | 3943 | 12,936 | 56.105°N 160.470°E | 1890 |
| Uzon | 1617 | 5305 | 54.50°N 159.97°E | 5700 BC |
| Veer | 520 | 1706 | 53.63°N 158.42°E | 1856 |
| Verkhovoy | 1400 | 4593 | 56.52°N 159.53°E | Holocene |
| Vilyuchik | 2173 | 7127 | 52.68°N 158.30°E | 8050 BC |
| Visokiy | 1234 | 4049 | 52.43°N 157.93°E | Holocene |
| Voyampolsky | 1225 | 4019 | 58.37°N 160.62°E | Holocene |
| Vysoky | 2161 | 7090 | 55.07°N 160.77°E | 50 BC |
| Yelovsky | 1381 | 4531 | 57.53°N 160.53°E | Holocene |
| Zaozerny | 1349 | 4426 | 56.88°N 159.95°E | Holocene |
| Zavaritsky | 1567 | 5141 | 53.905°N 158.385°E | - |
| Zheltovsky | 1953 | 6407 | 51.57°N 157.323°E | 1972 |
| Zhupanovsky | 2958 | 9705 | 53.590°N 159.147°E | 2016 |
| Zimina | 3119 | 10,230 | 55.85°N 160.50°E | - |

== Kuril Islands ==
Volcanoes of the Kuril Islands, in the northwestern Pacific Ocean between the Kamchatka Peninsula and Japan.

| Name | Elevation (m) | Elevation (ft) | Coordinates | Last eruption |
|---|---|---|---|---|
| Alaid | 2339 | 7674 | 50.85°N 155.55°E | 2019 |
| Atsonupuri | 1205 | 3952 | 44.8°N 147.1°E | 1932 |
| Baransky | 1132 | 3714 | 45.10°N 148.02°E | 1951 |
| Berutarube | 1221 | 4006 | 44.459°N 146.936°E | - |
| Bogatyr Ridge | 1634 | 5359 | 44.8°N 147.4°E | - |
| Chikurachki | 1816 | 5958 | 50.32°N 155.45°E | 2005 |
| Chirinkotan | 724 | 2375 | 48.98°N 153.48°E | 2013 |
| Chirip | 1589 | 5207 | 45.38°N 147.92°E | 1860 |
| Chirpoi | 742 | 2434 | 46.52°N 150.87°E | 2013 |
| Demon | 1205 | 3953 | 45.50°N 148.85°E | Holocene |
| Ebeko | 1156 | 3793 | 50.68°N 156.02°E | 2024 (continuing) |
| Ekarma | 1170 | 3839 | 48.956°N 153.93°E | 1980 |
| Fuss Peak | 1772 | 5814 | 50.27°N 155.25°E | 1854 |
| Golets-Torny Group | 442 | 1450 | 45.3°N 148.4°E | - |
| Golovnin | 543 | 1781 | 43.85°N 145.53°E | 1848 |
| Goriaschaia Sopka | 891 | 2923 | 46.83°N 151.75°E | 1914 |
| Grozny Group | 1211 | 3973 | 45.02°N 147.87°E | 1989 |
| Ivao Group | 1426 | 4678 | 45.77°N 149.68°E | Holocene |
| Karpinsky Group | 1345 | 4413 | 50.13°N 155.37°E | 1952 |
| Ketoi | 1172 | 3845 | 47.35°N 152.475°E | 1960 |
| Kharimkotan | 1145 | 3757 | 49.12°N 156.508°E | 1933 |
| Kolokol Group | 1328 | 4357 | 46.04°N 150.05°E | 1973 |
| Kuntomintar | 828 | 2717 | 48.77°N 154.02°E | Pleistocene-Fumarolic |
| Lomonosov Group | 1681 | 5513 | 50.3°N 155.4°E | - |
| Lvinaya Past | 528 | 1732 | 44.608°N 146.994°E | 7480 BC |
| Medvezhya | 1125 | 3691 | 45.387°N 148.843°E | 1999 |
| Mendeleyeva | 887 | 2913 | 43.98°N 145.70°E | 1907 |
| Milna | 1540 | 5052 | 46.82°N 151.78°E | - |
| Nemo Peak | 1018 | 3339 | 49.6°N 154.8°E | 1938 |
| Piip | -300 | -984 | 55.42°N 167.33°E | 5050 BC |
| Prevo Peak | 1360 | 4462 | 47.02°N 152.12°E | 1825 |
| Raikoke | 551 | 1808 | 48.29°N 153.25°E | 2019 |
| Rasshua | 956 | 3136 | 47.77°N 153.02°E | 1957 |
| Rudakov | 542 | 1778 | 45.88°N 149.83°E | Holocene |
| Sarychev Peak | 1496 | 4908 | 48.092°N 153.20°E | 2009 |
| Shirinki | 761 | 2497 | 50.20°N 154.98°E | Holocene |
| Sinarka | 934 | 3064 | 48.87°N 154.17°E | 1878 |
| Smirnov | 1189 | 3901 | 44.43°N 146.13°E | Holocene |
| Srednii | 36 | 108 | 47.6°N 152.9°E | - |
| Tao-Rusyr Caldera | 1325 | 4347 | 49.35°N 154.70°E | 1952 |
| Tiatia | 1819 | 5968 | 44.351°N 146.256°E | 1981 |
| Tri Sestry | 998 | 3274 | 45.93°N 149.92°E | Holocene |
| Urataman | 678 | 2224 | 47.12°N 152.23°E | Holocene |
| Ushishur | 401 | 1316 | 47.52°N 152.80°E | 1884 |
| Vernadskii Ridge | 1183 | 3881 | 50.55°N 155.97°E | Holocene |
| Zavaritski Caldera | 624 | 2047 | 46.925°N 151.95°E | 1957 |

== Other parts of Russia ==
| Name | Elevation (m) | Elevation (ft) | Coordinates | Area | Last eruption |
|---|---|---|---|---|---|
| Aluchin | | | 66.1°N 165.4°E | Chukchi Peninsula | 1000 AD? |
| Anyuyskiy | 1054 | 3,458 | 67°10′27″N 165°50′8″E | Anyuy Mountains | Pleistocene - Holocene? |
| Azas Plateau | 2765 | 9071 | 53.53°N 98.60°E | west of Lake Baikal | - |
| Balagan-Tas | 993 | 3258 | 66.43°N 143.73°E | Chersky Range, Siberia | 1775 |
| Jom-Bolok volcanic field | | | 52°42′0″N 98°58′48″E | west of Lake Baikal | 682-779 CE |
| Khulugayshi | | | 52°N 102.5°E | west of Lake Baikal | Quaternary |
| Oka Plateau | 2077 | 6814 | 53.70°N 98.98°E | between Irkutsk and Krasnoyarsk | - |
| Tunkin Depression | 1200 | 3937 | 51.50°N 102.50°E | west of Lake Baikal | Holocene |
| Udokan Plateau | 2180 | 7152 | 56.28°N 117.77°E | northeast of Lake Baikal | 220 BC |

== Example ==
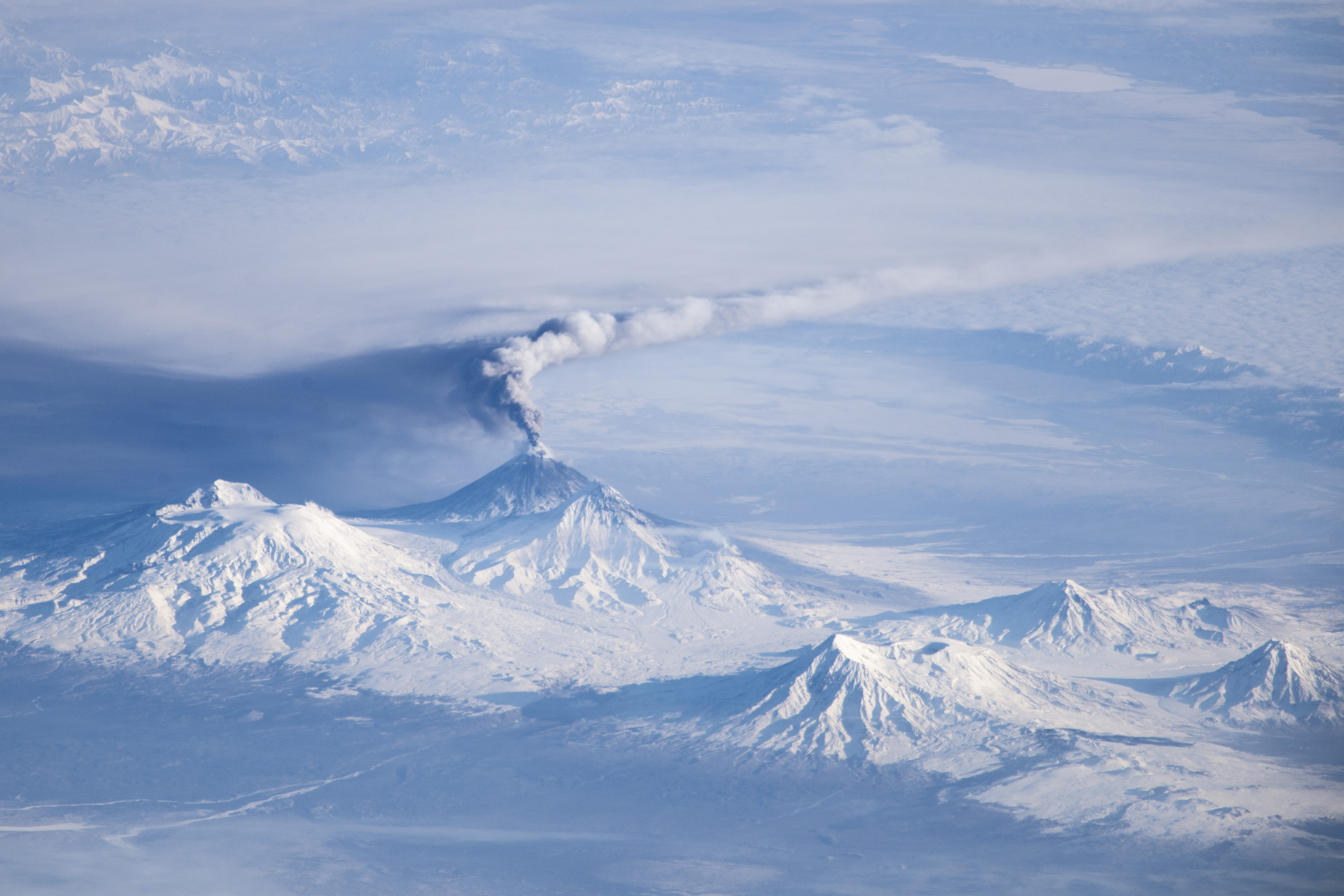
View includes Ushkovsky, Tolbachik, Bezymianny, Zimina, Udina, and Klyuchevskaya Sopka. Oblique view taken on November 16, 2013 from ISS.
