= Khangar =

Mountain in Kamchatka Peninsula, Russia

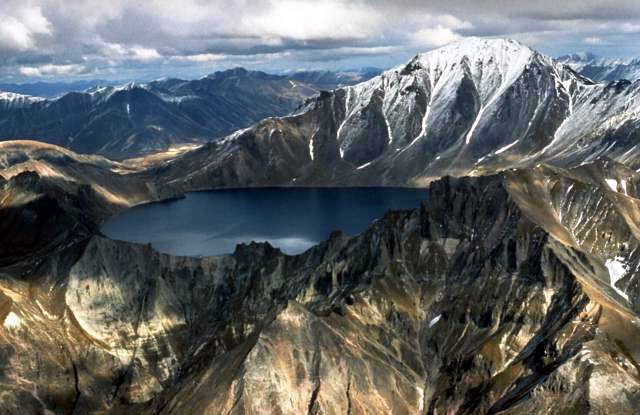

Highest point
- Elevation: 1,967 m (6,453 ft)
- Coordinates: 54.75°N 157.38°E

Geography
- Location within Far Eastern Federal District Location within Kamchatka Krai
- Location: Kamchatka, Russia
- Parent range: Sredinny Range

Geology
- Mountain type: Stratovolcano
- Last eruption: 1500 AD

Khangar (Russian: Хангар) is a stratovolcano located in the central part of Kamchatka Peninsula, Russia. It is the southernmost volcano of the Sredinny Range. Its 2 km-wide caldera is now filled by a lake.

== See also ==
- List of volcanoes in Russia
