= Chyorny Volcano =

Stratovolcano in central Kamchatka, Russia

Chyorny
- Location within Kamchatka Krai

Highest point
- Elevation: 1,778 m (5,833 ft)
- Coordinates: 56.82°N 159.67°E

Geography
- Location: Kamchatka, Russia
- Parent range: Middle Range

Geology
- Mountain type: Stratovolcano
- Last eruption: Unknown

Chyorny Volcano (Russian: Чёрный, romanized: Chyornyy, lit. 'Black') is a stratovolcano situated in the central Kamchatka peninsula in Russia.

== See also ==
- List of volcanoes in Russia
