= Tuzovskiy (volcano) =

Mountain in Kamchatka Peninsula, Russia

- Location within Russia

Highest point
- Elevation: 1,516 m (4,974 ft)
- Coordinates: 57.32°N 159.97°E

Geography
- Location: Kamchatka, Russia
- Parent range: Sredinny Range

Geology
- Mountain type: Shield volcanoes
- Last eruption: Unknown

Artur Tuzovskiy (Russian: Тузо́вский), also sometimes transliterated as Tuzovsky, is a shield volcano located in the northern part of Kamchatka Peninsula, Russia. It comprises three shield volcanoes from which Tuzovsky is the higher one.

== See also ==
- List of volcanoes in Russia
