= Bakening =

Stratovolcano in Kamchatka, Russia

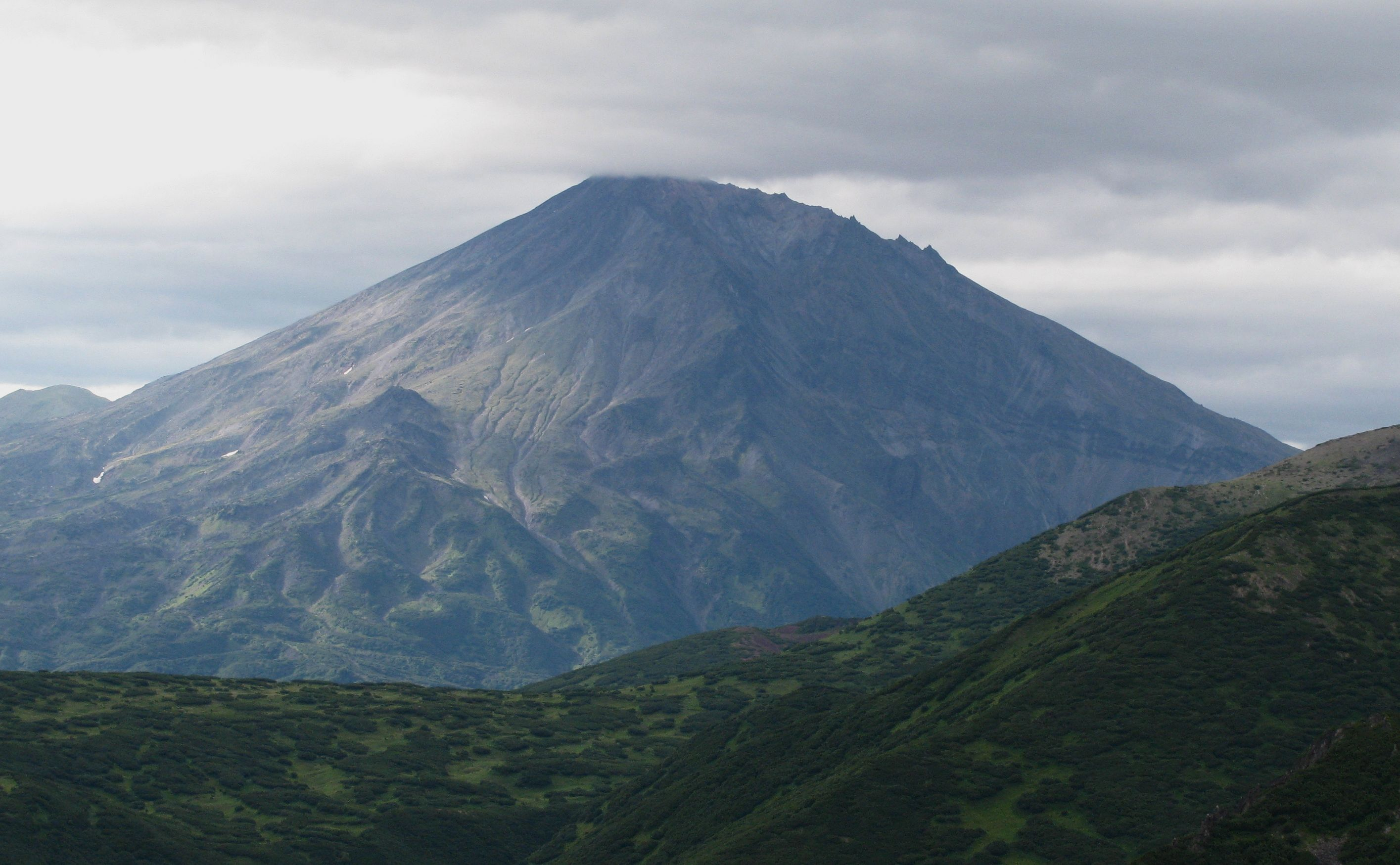

Highest point
- Elevation: 2,276 m (7,467 ft)
- Prominence: 1,610 m (5,280 ft)
- Listing: Ultra, Ribu
- Coordinates: 53°54′15″N 158°04′12″E

Geography
- Location within Kamchatka Krai
- Location: Kamchatka, Russia
- Parent range: Eastern Range

Geology
- Mountain type: Stratovolcano
- Last eruption: 550 BC

Bakening (Russian: Бакенинг) (also known as Bakenin (Russian: Бакенин)) is a stratovolcano located in the southern part of Kamchatka Peninsula, Russia.

== See also ==
- List of volcanoes in Russia
- List of ultras of Northeast Asia

== Sources ==
- "Bakening". Global Volcanism Program. Smithsonian Institution.
- "Gora Bakening, Russia". Peakbagger.com.
