= Vysoky (lower stratovolcano) =

Stratovolcno in southern Kamchatka, Russia

- Location within Kamchatka Krai Location within Russia

Highest point
- Elevation: 1,234 m (4,049 ft)
- Coordinates: 52.43°N 157.93°E

Geography
- Location: Kamchatka, Russia

Geology
- Mountain type: Stratovolcano
- Last eruption: Unknown

Vysoky (Russian: Высокий) is a stratovolcano located in the southern part of Kamchatka Peninsula, Russia.

"Высокий" means "tall" or "high" in Russian.

== See also ==
- List of volcanoes in Russia
