= Ozernoy =

Mountain in Kamchatka Peninsula, Russia

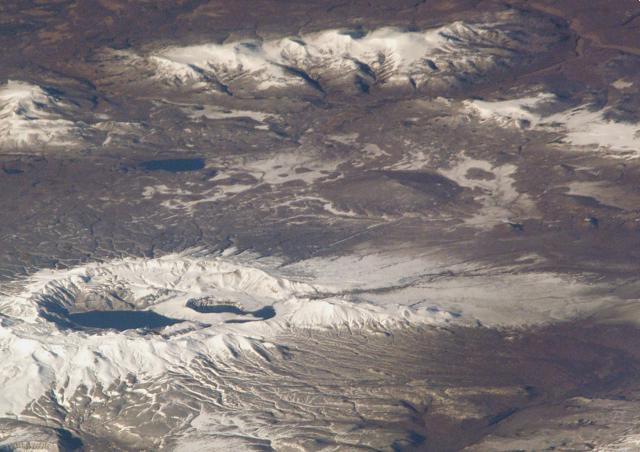

Highest point
- Elevation: 562 m (1,844 ft)
- Coordinates: 51.88°N 157.38°E

Geography
- Location within Russia Location within Kamchatka Krai
- Location: Kamchatka, Russia

Geology
- Mountain type: Shield volcano
- Last eruption: Unknown

Ozernoy (Russian: Озерной) is a small early Holocene basaltic shield volcano located in the southern part of the Kamchatka Peninsula in Russia. The massive Ksudach volcano is located nearby.

== See also ==
- List of volcanoes in Russia
