= Otdelny =

Shield volcano in Kamchatka Peninsula, Russia

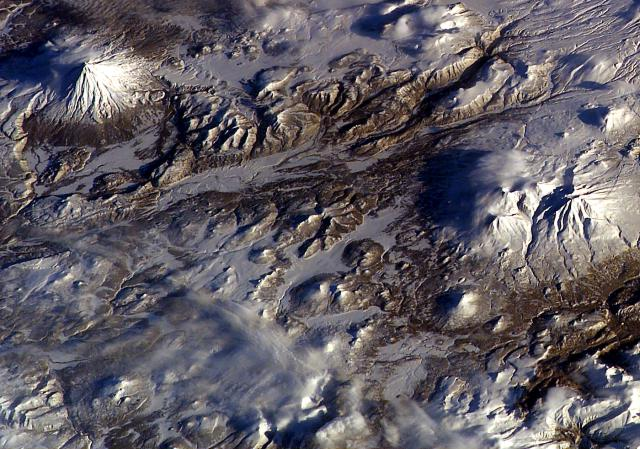
- Otdelniy, Tundroviy and other adjacent unnamed shield volcanoes are surrounded by a large group of late-Pleistocene to Holocene pyroclastic cones SE of Opala (the conical stratovolcano at the upper left) and SW of Asacha volcano (right-center)

Highest point
- Elevation: 791 m (2,595 ft)
- Coordinates: 52.220°N 157.428°E

Geography
- Location within Kamchatka Krai
- Location: Kamchatka, Russia

Geology
- Mountain type: Shield volcanoes
- Last eruption: Unknown

Otdelny (also known as Otdelniy) (Russian: Отде́льный) is a shield volcano located in the southern part of Kamchatka Peninsula, Russia, east of the Savan River.

== See also ==
- List of volcanoes in Russia
