= Koshelev (volcano) =

Complex stratovolcano in the Kamchatka peninsula, Russia

- Location within Kamchatka Krai

Highest point
- Elevation: 1,853 m (6,079 ft)
- Prominence: 1,268 m (4,160 ft)
- Listing: Ribu
- Coordinates: 51.357°N 156.75°E

Geography
- Location: Kamchatka, Russia
- Parent range: Eastern Range

Geology
- Mountain type: Stratovolcanoes
- Last eruption: 1690 ± 10 years

Koshelev (Russian: Кошелев) is a complex stratovolcano located in the southern part of Kamchatka Peninsula, Russia. It consists of four stratovolcanoes, from which the Central Koshelev is the highest.

== See also ==
- List of volcanoes in Russia
