= Uksichan =

Shield volcano in northern Kamchatka, Russia

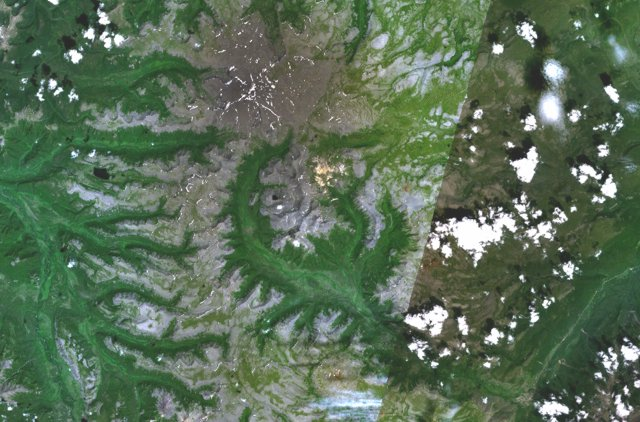
- Uksichan satellite view

Highest point
- Elevation: 1,692 m (5,551 ft)
- Coordinates: 56.08°N 158.38°E

Geography
- Location within Kamchatka Krai Location within Russia
- Location: Kamchatka, Russia
- Parent range: Sredinny Range

Geology
- Mountain type: Shield volcano
- Last eruption: Unknown

Uksichan (Russian: Уксичан) is a shield volcano located in the northern part of the Kamchatka Peninsula, Russia.

== See also ==
- List of volcanoes in Russia
