= Schmidt (volcano) =

Volcano in Kamchatka Peninsula, Russia

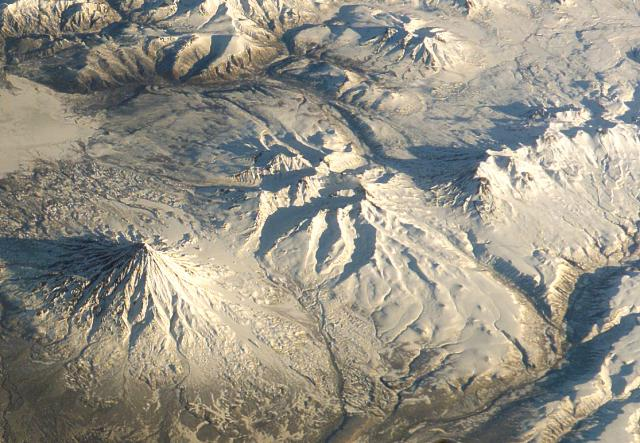
- The extensively eroded edifice in this center of this image with north to the upper right is Schmidt volcano. Schmidt is flanked by the conical Kronotsky stratovolcano at the lower left and the Gamchen complex at the far right.

Highest point
- Elevation: 2,020 m (6,630 ft)
- Coordinates: 54.92°N 160.63°E

Geography
- Location within Far Eastern Federal District
- Location: Kamchatka, Russia

Geology
- Mountain type: Shield volcano
- Last eruption: Unknown

Schmidt (Russian: Вулкан Шмидта, Vulkan Schmidta) is a shield volcano located in the southeastern part of Kamchatka Peninsula, Russia.

== See also ==
- List of volcanoes in Russia
