= Yelovsky (volcano) =

Shield volcano in central Kamchatka, Russia

Highest point
- Elevation: 1,381 m (4,531 ft)
- Coordinates: 57.55°N 160.53°E

Geography
- Location: Kamchatka Peninsula, Russia
- Parent range: Sredinny Range

Geology
- Mountain type: Shield volcano
- Last eruption: 7550 BCE ± 500 years

Yelovsky (Russian: Еловский вулкан) is an extinct shield volcano in central Kamchatka. The volcano is the edifice among several overlapping small basaltic shield volcanoes. Yelovsky is located at the east of the crest of the Sredinny Range.

== See also ==
- List of volcanoes in Russia
