= Komarov (volcano) =

Stratovolcano in the southeastern part of the Kamchatka peninsula

- Location within Kamchatka Krai

Highest point
- Elevation: 2,065 m (6,775 ft)
- Coordinates: 55.032°N 160.720°E

Geography
- Location: Kamchatka, Russia
- Parent range: Eastern Range

Geology
- Mountain type: Stratovolcano
- Last eruption: 950 CE (?)

Komarov (Russian: Комаров) is an inactive stratovolcano located in the southeastern part of the Kamchatka Peninsula, Russia. It was named after Vladimir L. Komarov.

== See also ==
- List of volcanoes in Russia
