= Kebeney =

Shield volcano in the Sredinny range, Russia

- Location within Kamchatka Krai

Highest point
- Elevation: 1,527 m (5,010 ft)
- Coordinates: 57.10°N 159.93°E

Geography
- Location: Kamchatka, Russia
- Parent range: Sredinny Range

Geology
- Mountain type: Shield volcano
- Last eruption: Unknown

Kebeney (Russian: Кэбеней) is an extinct shield volcano located in central Sredinny Range, in the northern part of the Kamchatka Peninsula, Russia. It is a basaltic/andesidic shield volcano with a number of cinder cones on its flanks, aligned along the Sredinny Range NE-SW axis.

== See also ==
- List of volcanoes in Russia
