= Maly Semyachik =

Stratovolcano in Kamchatka, Russia

- Малый Семячик
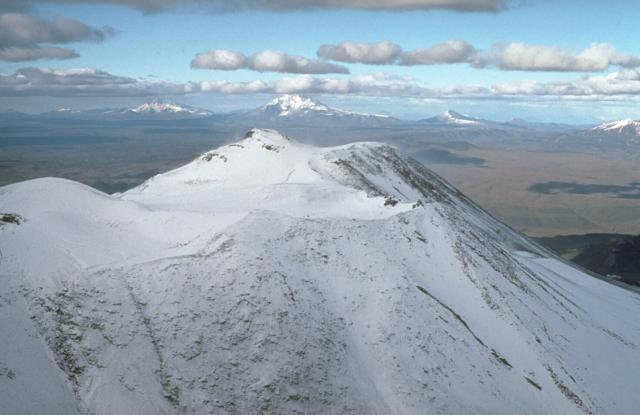
- Maly Semyachik peak

Highest point
- Elevation: 1,527 m (5,010 ft)
- Listing: List of volcanoes in Russia
- Coordinates: 54°08′N 159°40′E

Geography
- Location within Russia
- Location: Kamchatka, Russia

Geology
- Mountain type: Stratovolcano within a caldera
- Last eruption: December 1952

Maly Semyachik (Russian: Малый Семячик) is a stratovolcano located in the eastern part of Kamchatka Peninsula, Russia. It is a compound stratovolcano located in a 10-km-wide caldera within the 15×20-km mid-Pleistocene Stena-Soboliny caldera. Three overlapping stratovolcanoes were constructed sequentially along a NE-SW line, with the youngest cone, Tseno-Semyachik, at the southwest end. A hot, acidic crater lake fills the historically active Troitsky Crater, which formed during a large explosive eruption of Ceno-Semiachik about 400 years ago.

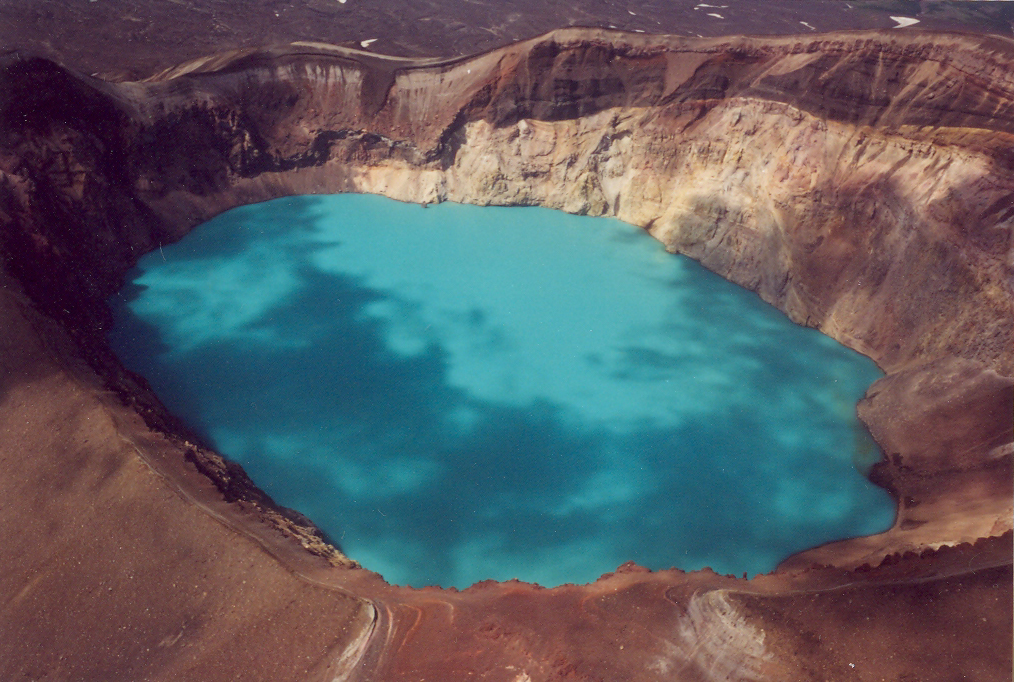
Maly Semyachik with acidic crater lake

The water in the lake is poisonous and has an unusual bright turquoise color as a result of several types of acids and other substances being dissolved in it. The water in the lake never freezes, even when everything is covered with a layer of ice and deep snow. The name "Semyachik" in translation from Itelmensky means "Stone Earth".
