= Khulugayshi =

Coordinates: 52°N 102.5°E

Khulugayshi is a volcano in Russia. It is formed by an explosion vent or diatreme in the Mondinsk Depression. The volcano's eruption products lie on top of gravels of Quaternary age and consist of olivine tuffs.
