= Opala (volcano) =

Stratovolcano on the southern part of the Kamchatka peninsula, Russia

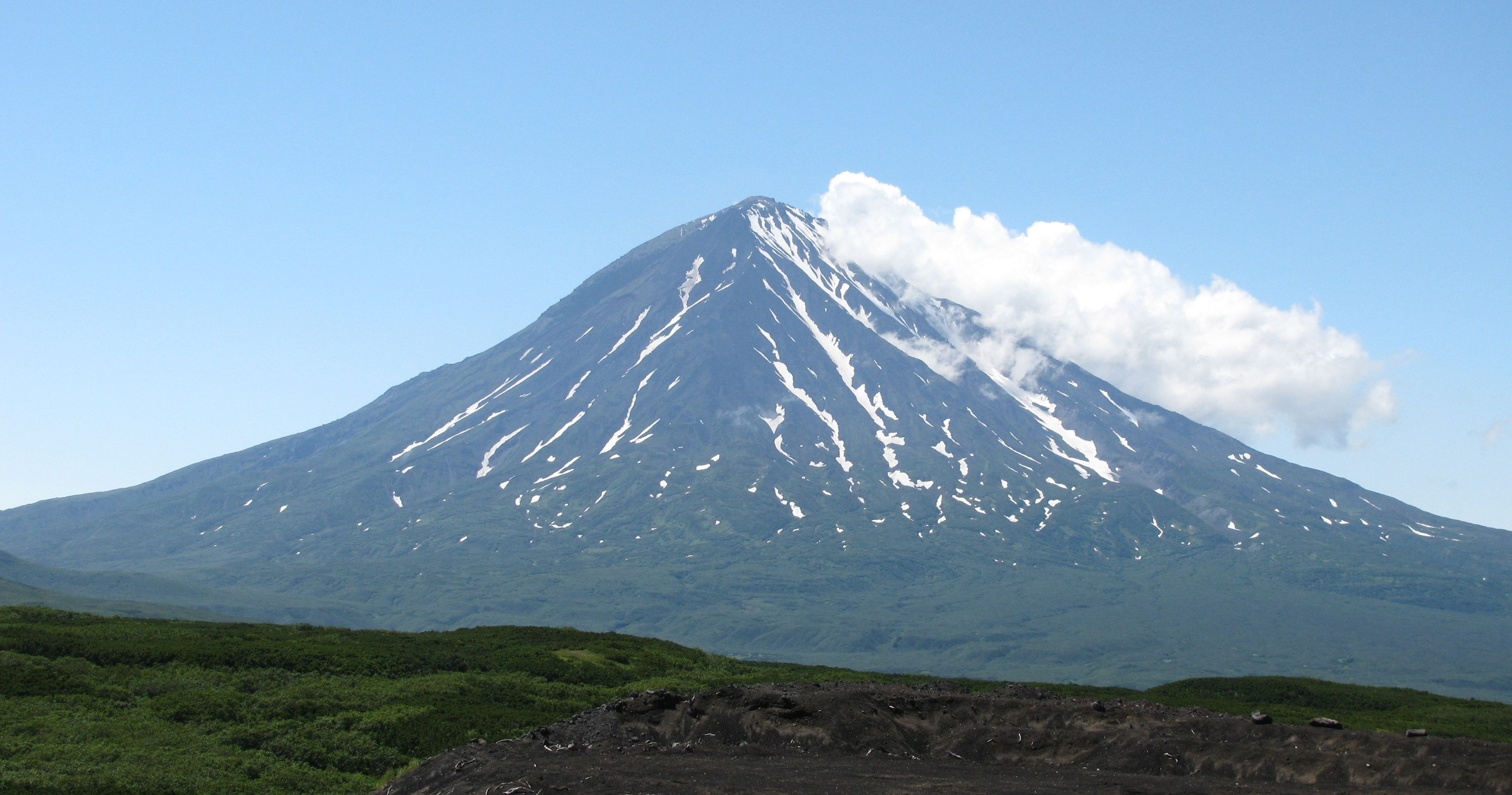
- Opala

Highest point
- Elevation: 2,460 m (8,070 ft)
- Prominence: 2,070 m (6,790 ft)
- Listing: Ultra, Ribu
- Coordinates: 52°32′36″N 157°20′21″E

Geography
- Location within Kamchatka Krai Location within Russia
- Location: Kamchatka, Russia
- Parent range: Eastern Range

Geology
- Rock age: late-Pleistocene to Holocene
- Mountain type: Stratovolcano
- Last eruption: ???

Opala (Russian: Опала) is a stratovolcano located in the southern part of the Kamchatka Peninsula, Russia.

== Recent eruption history ==
There is no real evidence of recent eruptions that have been found at the slopes of the volcano.

== See also ==
- List of volcanoes in Russia
- List of ultras of Northeast Asia
