= Antsiferov =

Antsiferov (feminine form: Antsiferova) is a Russian-language surname derived from the archaic Russian first name "Antsifer" (Анцифер), in turn derived from "Onisifor" (Онисифор, Onesiphorus).

People with the name include:

- Alexei Antsiferov (born 1991), a Kazakhstani-Russian ice hockey player
- Danila Antsiferov (died 1712), Russian explorer, after whom Antsiferov Island in the Kuril Islands is named
- Nikolai Antsiferov (1889–1958), Russian historian
