= Chirip =

Volcano located in the central part of Iturup Island

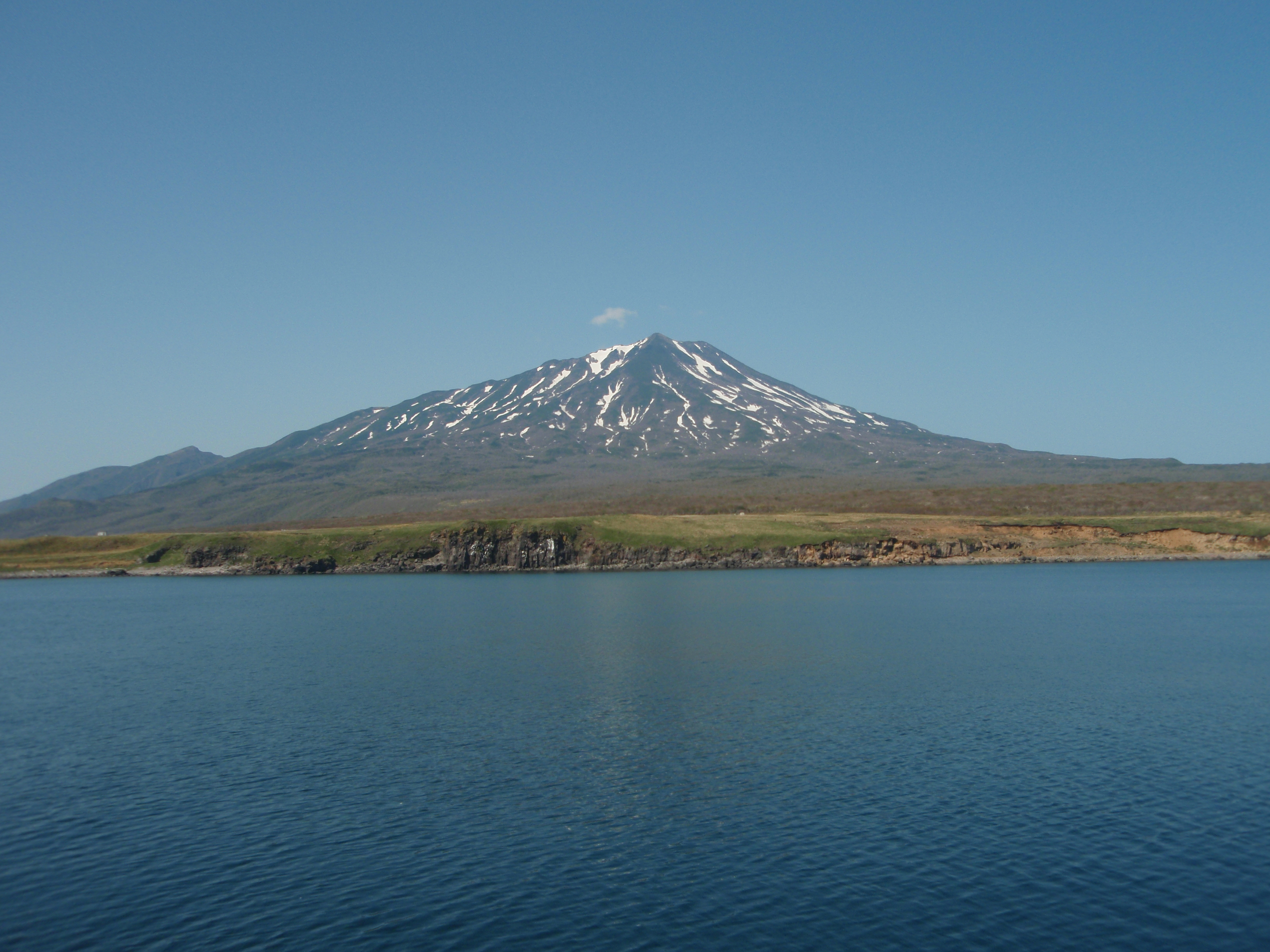

Highest point
- Elevation: 1,587 m (5,207 ft)
- Prominence: ± 5043
- Coordinates: 45.338°N 147.925°E

Geography
- Location within Far Eastern Federal District
- Location: Iturup, Kuril Islands, Russia

Geology
- Mountain type: Stratovolcanoes
- Last eruption: 1860 (?)

Climbing
- Easiest route: east slope (?)

Chirip (Russian: Чирип, Japanese: 北散布山) is a volcano located in the central part of Iturup Island, Kuril Islands, Russia. In lies on the Chirip Peninsula and comprises two twin stratovolcanoes, Chirip and Bogdan Hmelnitskiy. The western side is the steepest, sharing a basin with a small lake with Bogdan Hmelnitskiy. The basin has features that were created during an eruption. Many types of lava are found, including basalt, andesite, and small amounts of dacite.

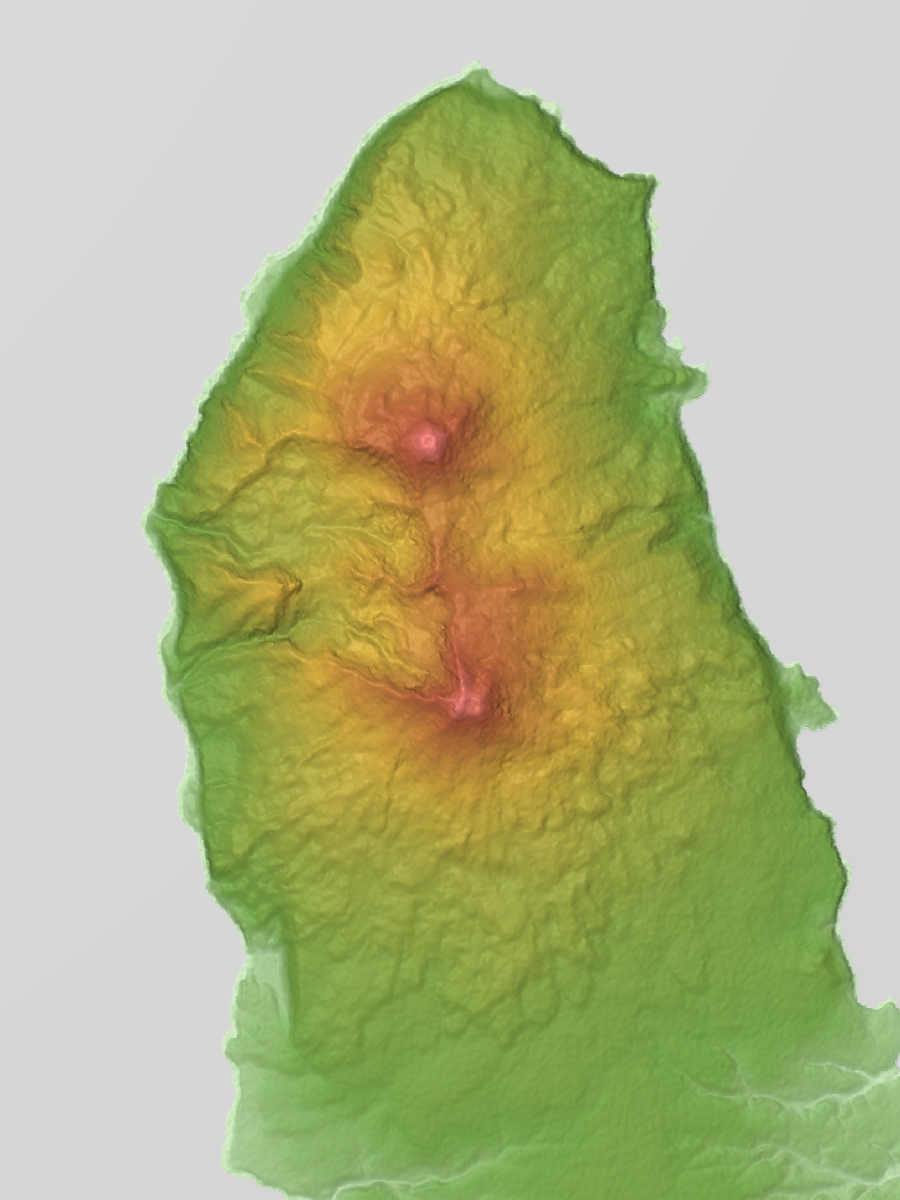
Relief map

== See also ==
- List of volcanoes in Russia
