= Goryashchaya Sopka =

Explosive stratovolcano on the Kuril Islands in Russia

- Location within Far Eastern Federal District

Highest point
- Elevation: 891 m (2,923 ft)
- Coordinates: 46.83°N 151.75°E

Geography
- Location: Simushir, Kuril Islands, Russia

Geology
- Mountain type: Stratovolcano
- Last eruption: June 1914

Goryashchaya Sopka (Russian: Горя́щая со́пка; lit. burning hill) is an explosive stratovolcano on the Kuril Islands in Russia. Its summit is at 891 meters (2,923 ft).

It is currently dormant, and its last eruption was in 1914. It has had five explosive eruptions between 1842 and 1914.

== See also ==
- List of volcanoes in Russia
