= Vysoky (higher stratovolcano) =

Mountain in Kamchatka Peninsula, Russia

- Location within Kamchatka Krai Location within Russia

Highest point
- Elevation: 2,129 m (6,985 ft)
- Coordinates: 55.07°N 160.77°E

Geography
- Location: Kamchatka, Russia

Geology
- Mountain type: Stratovolcano
- Last eruption: 550 BCE (?)

Vysoky (Russian: Высокий) is a stratovolcano located in the southeastern part of Kamchatka Peninsula, Russia. Its name literally means "tall" or "high" in Russian.

== See also ==
- List of volcanoes in Russia
