= Golets-Torny Group =

Mountain in Russia

- Location within Far Eastern Federal District

Highest point
- Elevation: 442 m (1,450 ft)
- Coordinates: 45.25°N 148.35°E

Geography
- Location: Iturup, Kuril Islands, Russia

Geology
- Mountain type: Pyroclastic cones
- Last eruption: Unknown

Golets-Torny Group (Russian: Голец-Торная группа) is a group of cinder cones located in the northern part of Iturup Island, Kuril Islands, Russia.

== See also ==
- List of volcanoes in Russia
- Golets (geography)
