= Zheltovsky =

Stratovolcano in the southern part of Kamchatka, Russia

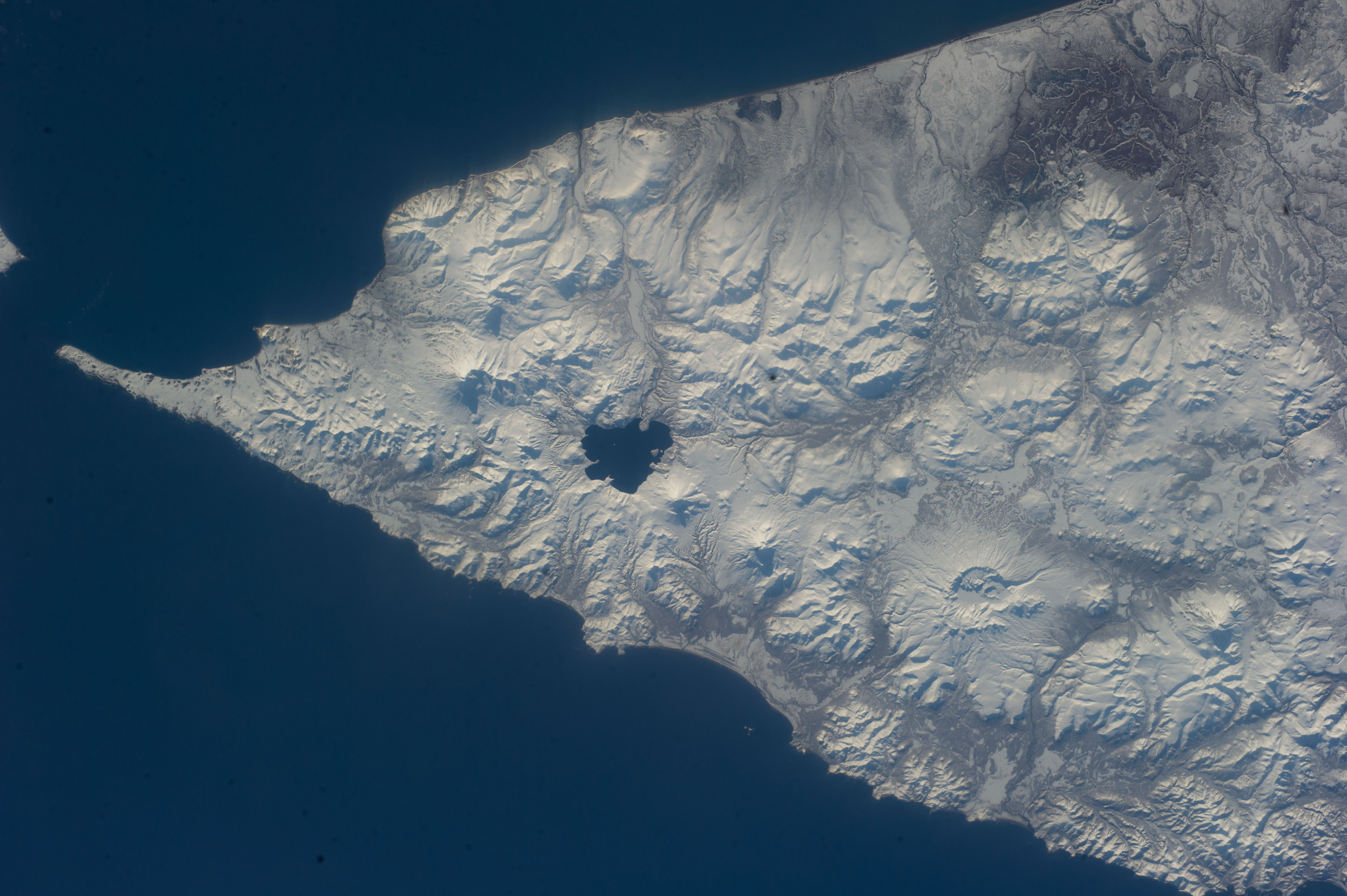

Highest point
- Elevation: 1,957 m (6,421 ft)
- Prominence: 1,730 m (5,680 ft)
- Listing: Ultra, Ribu
- Coordinates: 51°34′36″N 157°19′42″E

Geography
- Location within Russia
- Location: Kamchatka, Russia
- Parent range: Eastern Range

Geology
- Mountain type: Stratovolcano
- Last eruption: 1923

Zheltovsky (Russian: Желтовский) is a stratovolcano located in the southern part of the Kamchatka Peninsula, Russia.

== See also ==
- List of volcanoes in Russia
- List of ultras of Northeast Asia
