= Mashkovtsev (volcano) =

Stratovolcano in Kamchatka Peninsula, Russia

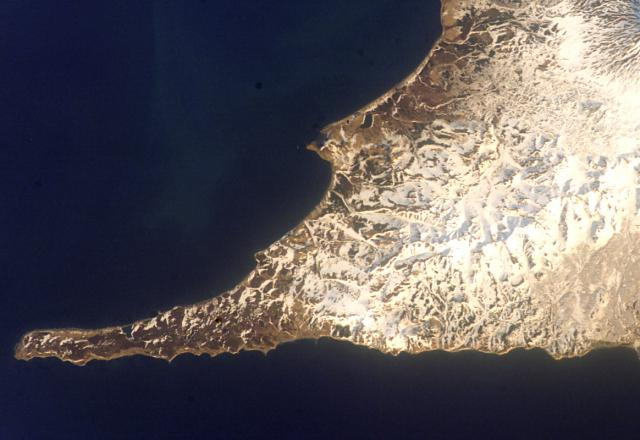
- Mashkovtsev & Cape Lopatka

Highest point
- Elevation: 503 m (1,650 ft)
- Coordinates: 51.10°N 156.72°E

Geography
- Location within Kamchatka Krai
- Location: Kamchatka, Russia

Geology
- Mountain type: Stratovolcano
- Last eruption: Unknown

Mashkovtsev (Russian: Машковцев) is a small stratovolcano located in the southern part of the Kamchatka Peninsula, Russia. It is the southernmost holocene volcano of Kamchatka.

== See also ==
- List of volcanoes in Russia
