= Lomonosov Group =

Group of cinder cones in the southern part of Paramushir island

- Location within Far Eastern Federal District

Highest point
- Elevation: 1,681 m (5,515 ft)
- Coordinates: 50.25°N 155.43°E

Geography
- Location: Paramushir, Kuril Islands, Russia

Geology
- Mountain type: Cinder cones
- Last eruption: Unknown

Lomonosov Group (Russian: Группа Ломоносова) is a volcanic group of cinder cones located in the southern part of Paramushir Island, Kuril Islands, Russia.

== See also ==
- List of volcanoes in Russia
