= Atsonupuri =

Stratovolcano in central Iturup

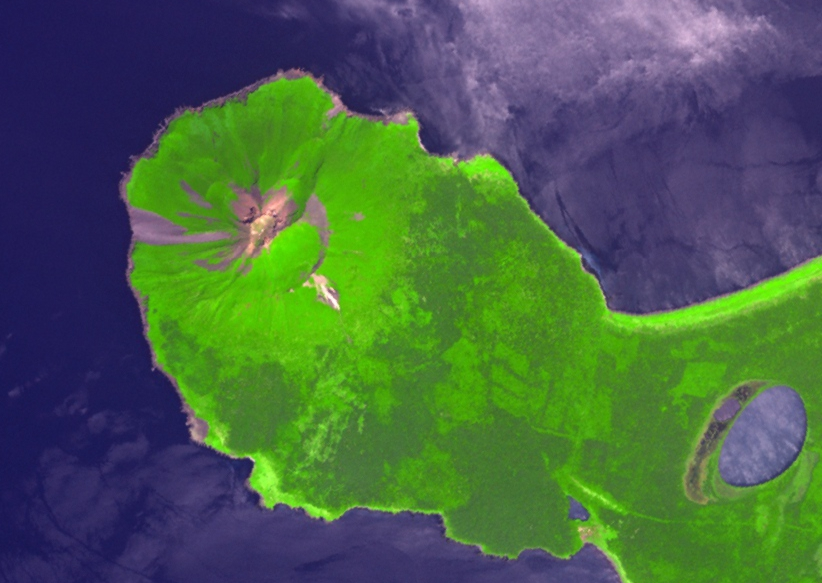

Highest point
- Elevation: 1,206 m (3,957 ft)
- Prominence: 1,181 m (3,875 ft)
- Listing: List of volcanoes in Russia, Ribu
- Coordinates: 44.808°N 147.131°E

Geography
- Location within Russia
- Location: Iturup, Kuril Islands, Russia

Geology
- Mountain type: Stratovolcano
- Last eruption: 1932

Atsonupuri (Russian: Атсонупури; Ainu: アトゥサヌプリ, Atusa-nupuri; Japanese: 阿登佐岳, Atosa-dake) is a stratovolcano located in the central part of Iturup Island, Kuril Islands, Russia.

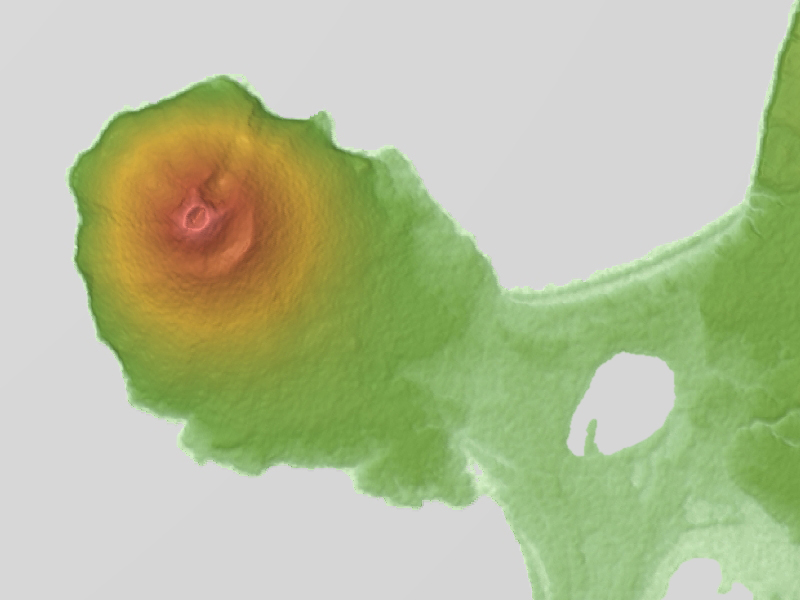
Relief Map
