= Baransky =

Stratovolcano located in the Kuril Islands, Russia

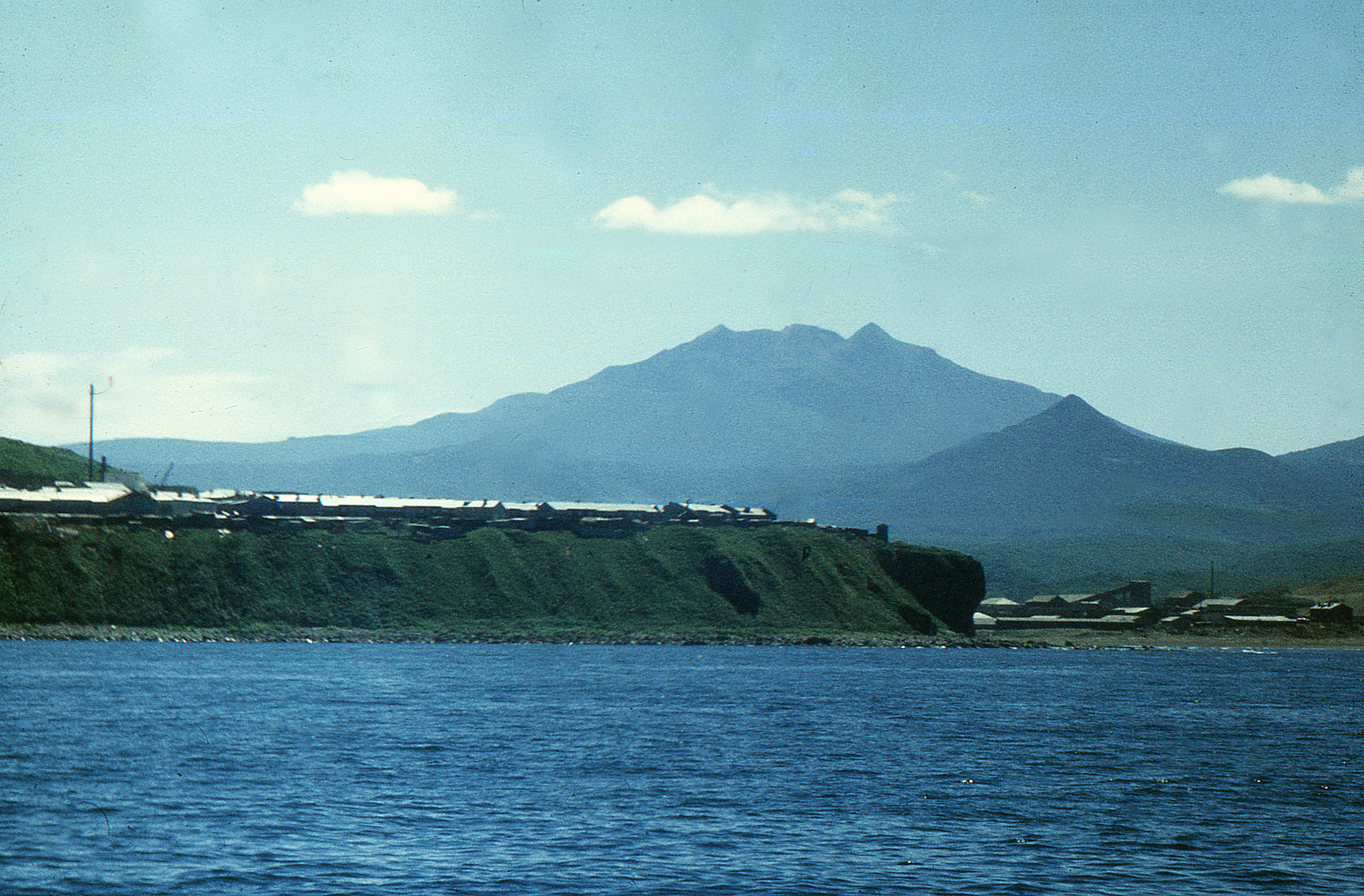
- Baransky volcano in 1990

Highest point
- Elevation: 1,125 m (3,691 ft)
- Coordinates: 45.097°N 148.024°E

Geography
- Location within Far Eastern Federal District
- Location: Iturup, Kuril Islands, Russia

Geology
- Mountain type: Stratovolcano
- Last eruption: July 1951

Baransky (Russian: Вулкан Баранского, Vulkan Baranskogo; Japanese: 指臼岳, Sashiusu-dake) is a stratovolcano located in the central part of Iturup Island, Kuril Islands, Russia.

The volcano is named after Nikolay Baransky, Soviet economic geographer. Its only known eruption occurred in 1951 and was cited as only minor activity.

== See also ==
- List of volcanoes in Russia
