= Berutarube =

Stratovolcano located in the Kuril islands, Russia

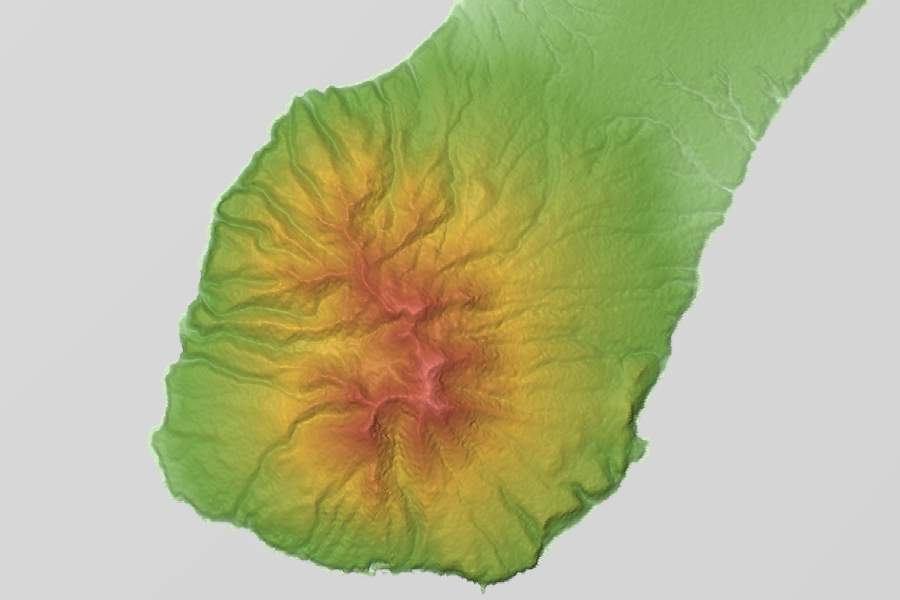

Highest point
- Elevation: 1,220 m (4,000 ft)
- Prominence: 1,144 m (3,753 ft)
- Listing: Ribu
- Coordinates: 44.459°N 146.936°E

Geography
- Location within Far Eastern Federal District
- Location: Iturup, Kuril Islands, Russia

Geology
- Mountain type: Stratovolcano
- Last eruption: 1936

Berutarube (Russian: Берутарубе; Japanese: ベルタルベ山, Berutarube-zan) is a stratovolcano located at the southern end of Iturup Island, Kuril Islands, Russia.

== See also ==
- List of volcanoes in Russia
