= Ebeko =

Somma volcano on Paramushir Island, Russia

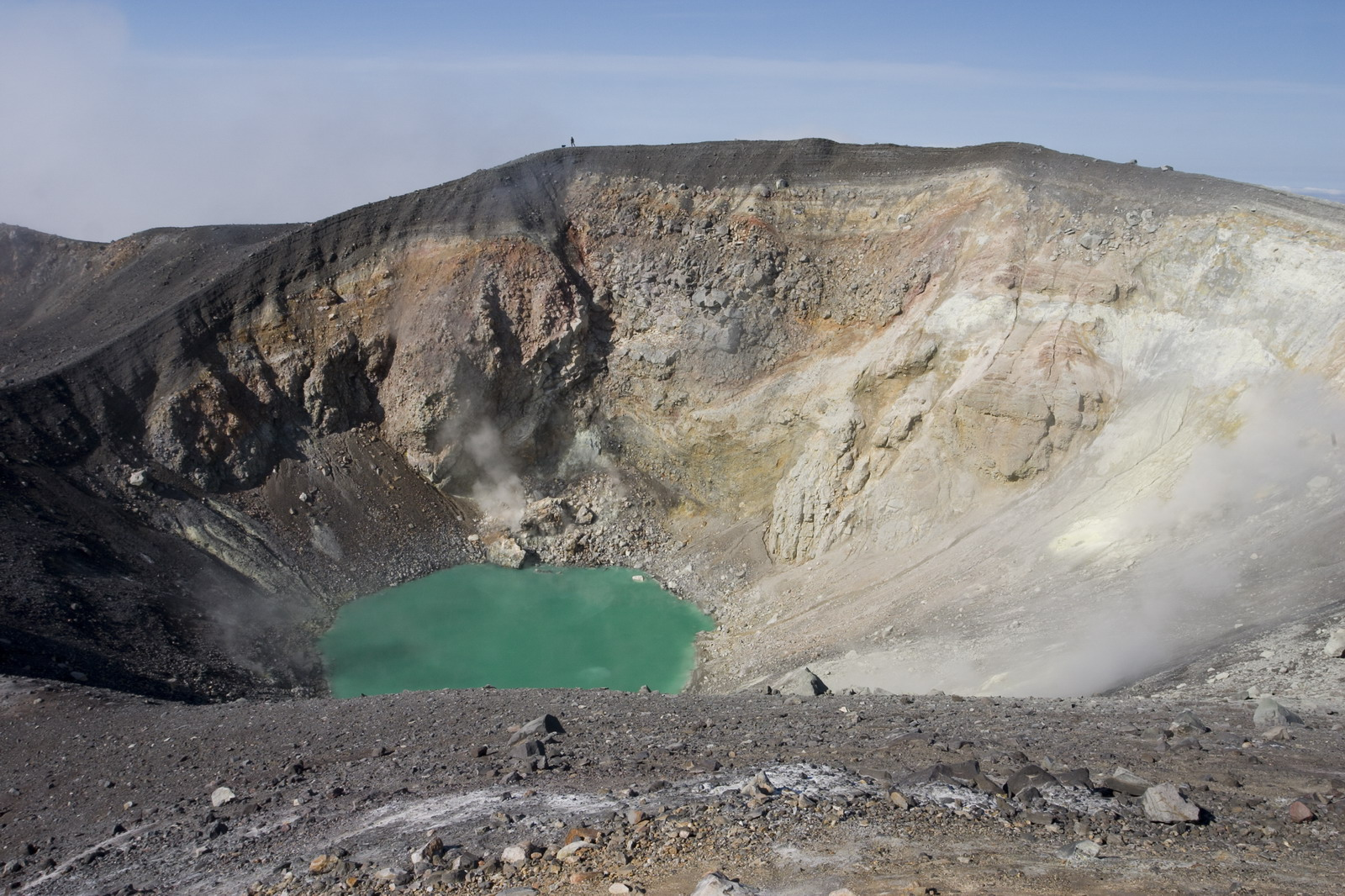
- One explosion crater at the summit.

Highest point
- Elevation: 1,156 m (3,793 ft)
- Coordinates: 50.686111°N 156.013889°E

Geography
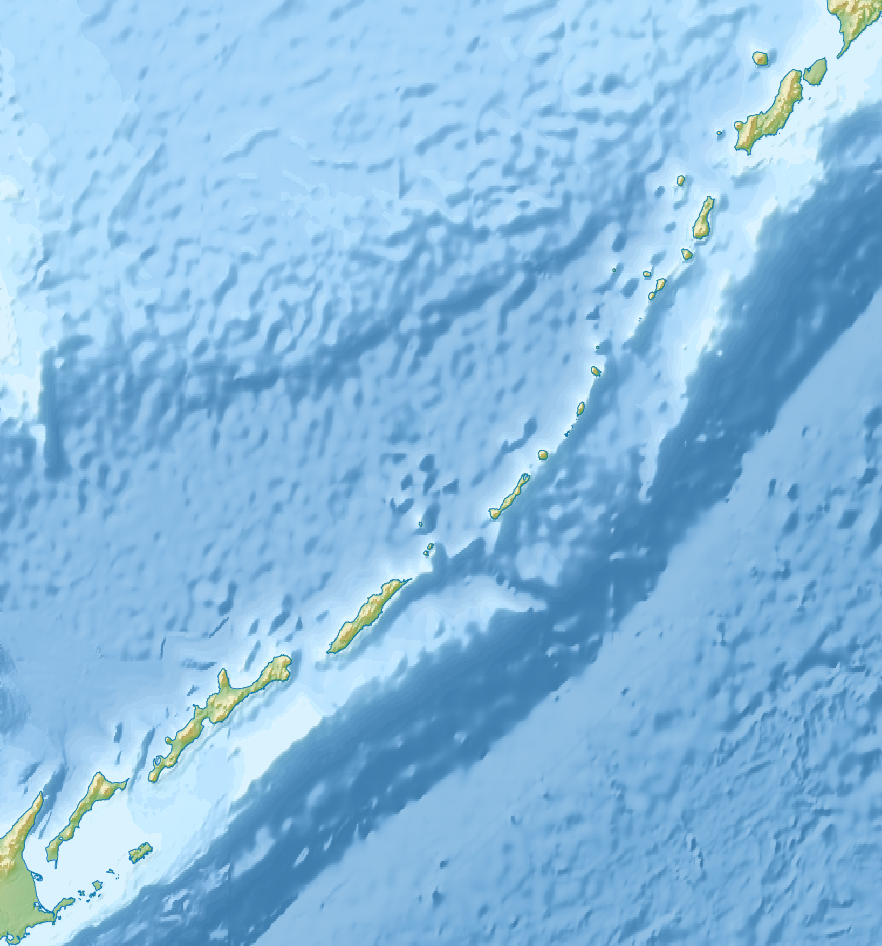
- Location within Russia Location within Kuril Islands
- Location: Paramushir, Kuril Islands, Russia

Geology
- Mountain type: Somma volcano
- Last eruption: 2024

Ebeko (Russian: Эбеко) is a highly active somma volcano located on the northern end of Paramushir Island, Kuril Islands, Russia. It is one of the most active volcanoes of the Kuril Islands. Eleven eruptions have been recorded between 1793 and 1991. Most of the eruptions are small (VEI=1) with the exception of the 1859 eruption (VEI=3). Most eruptions were phreatic and explosive.

The volcano's most recent eruption was in August 2024, when it emitted an ash cloud 2.5 kilometres (2 mi) high.

== See also ==
- List of volcanoes in Russia
