= Rasshua =

Uninhabited island in the Kuril Island chain

Native name: Расшуа (Russian); 羅処和島 (Japanese)
- NASA picture of Rasshua Island

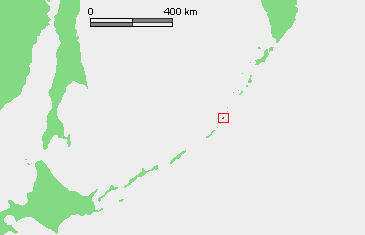

Geography
- Location: Sea of Okhotsk
- Coordinates: 47.77°N 153.02°E
- Archipelago: Kuril Islands
- Area: 63.2 km^{2} (24.4 sq mi)
- Highest elevation: 956 m (3136 ft)
- Highest point: Rasshua

Administration
- Russia

Demographics
- Population: 0
- Ethnic groups: Ainu (formerly)

Rasshua (Russian: Расшуа; Japanese: 羅処和島, romanized: Rashowa-tō) is an uninhabited volcanic island near the center of the Kuril Islands chain in the Sea of Okhotsk in the northwest Pacific Ocean, 16 kilometres (9.9 mi) from Ushishir and 30 kilometres (19 mi) southwest of Matua. Its name is derived from the Ainu language for “fur coat”, "Rushu o a" (ルシュ・オ・ア), or "abundant furs", "Rushi o a" (ルシ・オ・ア).

== Geology ==
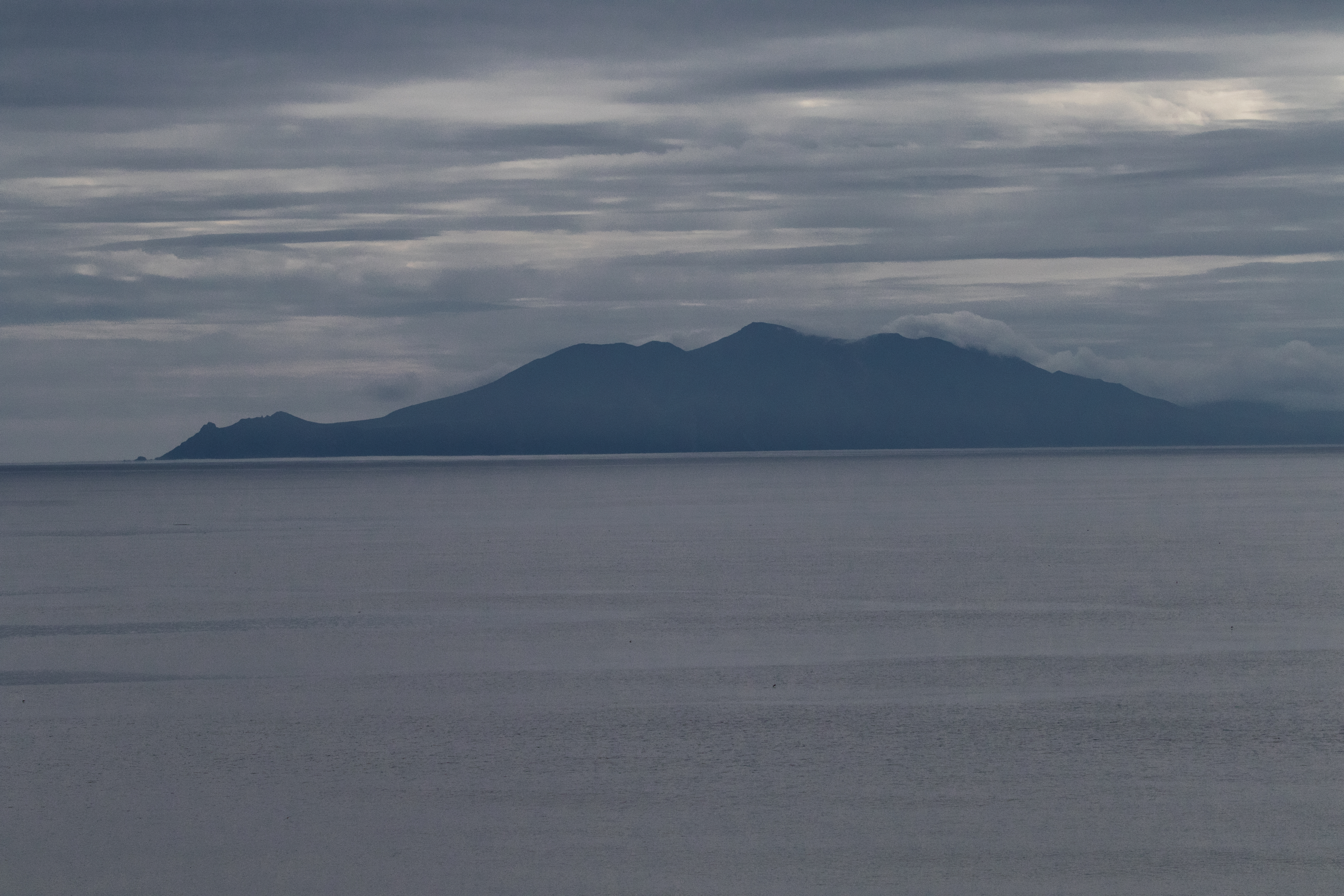
Rasshua Island as seen from the Sea of Okhotsk looking south.

Rasshua is roughly oval, with a length of 15.5 kilometres (9.6 mi) with a width of 6.5 kilometres (4.0 mi), and an area of 63.2 square kilometres (24.4 sq mi). The island is a complex stratovolcano with three overlapping central cones within a 6 kilometer caldera whose eastern margin is beyond the shoreline. The island has five small fresh water lakes, and numerous hot springs.

Rasshua Peak (Russian: влк. Расшуа, Japanese: 幌茶々登山, romanized: Horochachanobori-yama), in the west of the island is the island’s highest point at 956 metres (3,136 ft). The peak has not erupted in historic times, although it emits quantities of volcanic gas and its sides are streaked with sulfur deposits.

The easternmost cone (Japanese: 長頭山, romanized: Chōtōzan; (Russian: гора Циото) with a height of 503 metres (1,650 ft), violently erupted in 1846. The only other known historical eruption produced weak explosions in 1957. Active fulmaroles are found in the eastern crater and in the saddle between the two summit cones. It had a mild eruption on February 6, 2013.

=== Major features ===
- Ozero Beloye (lake)
- Ozero Tikhoye (lake)
- Maul (mountain)
- Rasshua (volcano)
- Serp (mountain)

== History ==
Rasshua was inhabited by the Ainu, at the time of European contact, and the remains of over 40 dwellings have been discovered. The island appears on an official map showing the territories of Matsumae Domain, a feudal domain of Edo period Japan dated 1644, and these holdings were officially confirmed by the Tokugawa shogunate in 1715. Subsequently, claimed by the Empire of Russia, sovereignty initially passed to Russia under the terms of the Treaty of Shimoda, but was returned to the Empire of Japan per the Treaty of Saint Petersburg along with the rest of the Kuril islands. At this time, the remaining Ainu inhabitants (eight families) were forcibly relocated to Shikotan, and the island became uninhabited. The island was formerly administered as part of Shimushiru District of Nemuro Subprefecture of Hokkaidō.

After World War II, the island came under the control of the Soviet Union, and is now administered as part of the Sakhalin Oblast of the Russian Federation.

== See also ==
- List of volcanoes in Russia
