= Eastern Range (Kamchatka) =

Mountain range in Russia

- Восточный хребет
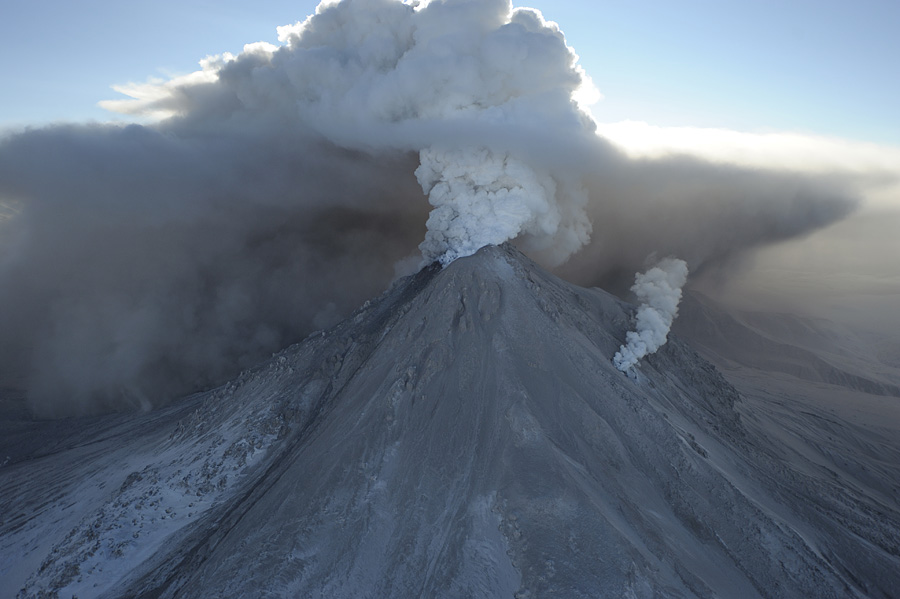
- Kizimen Volcano in 2011

Highest point
- Peak: Klyuchevskaya Sopka
- Elevation: 4,754 m (15,597 ft)
- Coordinates: 53°03′22″N 160°38′39″E

Dimensions
- Length: 600 km (370 mi) NNE / SSW
- Width: 120 km (75 mi) WNW / ESE

Geography
- Location within Kamchatka Krai
- Country: Russia
- Federal subject: Kamchatka Krai
- Range coordinates: 54°N 159°E

Geology
- Orogeny: Cenozoic orogeny
- Rock age: Upper Cretaceous
- Rock type: Volcanic rocks

Eastern Range (Russian: Восточный хребет,Vostochny Hrebet) is a mountain range on the Kamchatka Peninsula, Kamchatka Krai, Russian Far East. It is a complex range, mainly consisting of volcanic peaks. Together with the Middle Range, it is one of the two main mountain systems of the peninsula.

== Geography ==
The Eastern Range stretches roughly from NNE to SSW for 600 kilometres (370 mi) along the eastern part of the peninsula between the southern Karaginsky Gulf at the northern end and Avacha Bay at the southern. The highest point is Klyuchevskaya Sopka, a 4,754 metres (15,597 ft)-high stratovolcano. The range is made up of a number of separate ranges having steep western slopes and more gentle eastern ones. The central Kamchatka Depression, with the valley of the Kamchatka River, separates the Eastern Range from the Middle Range of the peninsula to the west. The main part of the Eastern Range is part of the East Kamchatka Anticline dating back to the Cenozoic orogeny, composed of Upper Cretaceous sediments and volcanic rocks, such as basalt and tuff.

=== Subranges ===
The system of the Eastern Range comprises a number of subranges, including the following:

- Kumroch Range, highest point 2,346 metres (7,697 ft). The northernmost subrange.
- Tumrok Range, highest point 2,334 metres (7,657 ft).
- Valagin Range, highest point 1,794 metres (5,886 ft).
- Ganal Range, highest point 2,277 metres (7,470 ft). The southernmost subrange.

Some geographic works include the Kluchevskaya group of volcanoes, highest point 4,750 metres (15,580 ft), as well as the Gamchen Range, highest point 2,576 metres (8,451 ft), as part of the Eastern Range. The first is located to the west of the Kumroch Range and the other to the east of the Tumrok Range.

The Eastern Kamchatka zone of recent and ongoing volcanic eruptions is around the area where the Valagin and the Tumrok ranges meet, with a number of active volcanoes, such as the Kizimen, Shiveluch, and Karymskaya Sopka.

== Flora ==
The lower parts of the slopes of the Eastern Range are covered in birch and fir forests and dwarf cedar shrub, as well as rhododendron.

== See also ==
- List of mountains in Russia
- List of volcanoes in Russia
