= Sredinny Range =

Mountain range in Kamchatka, Russia

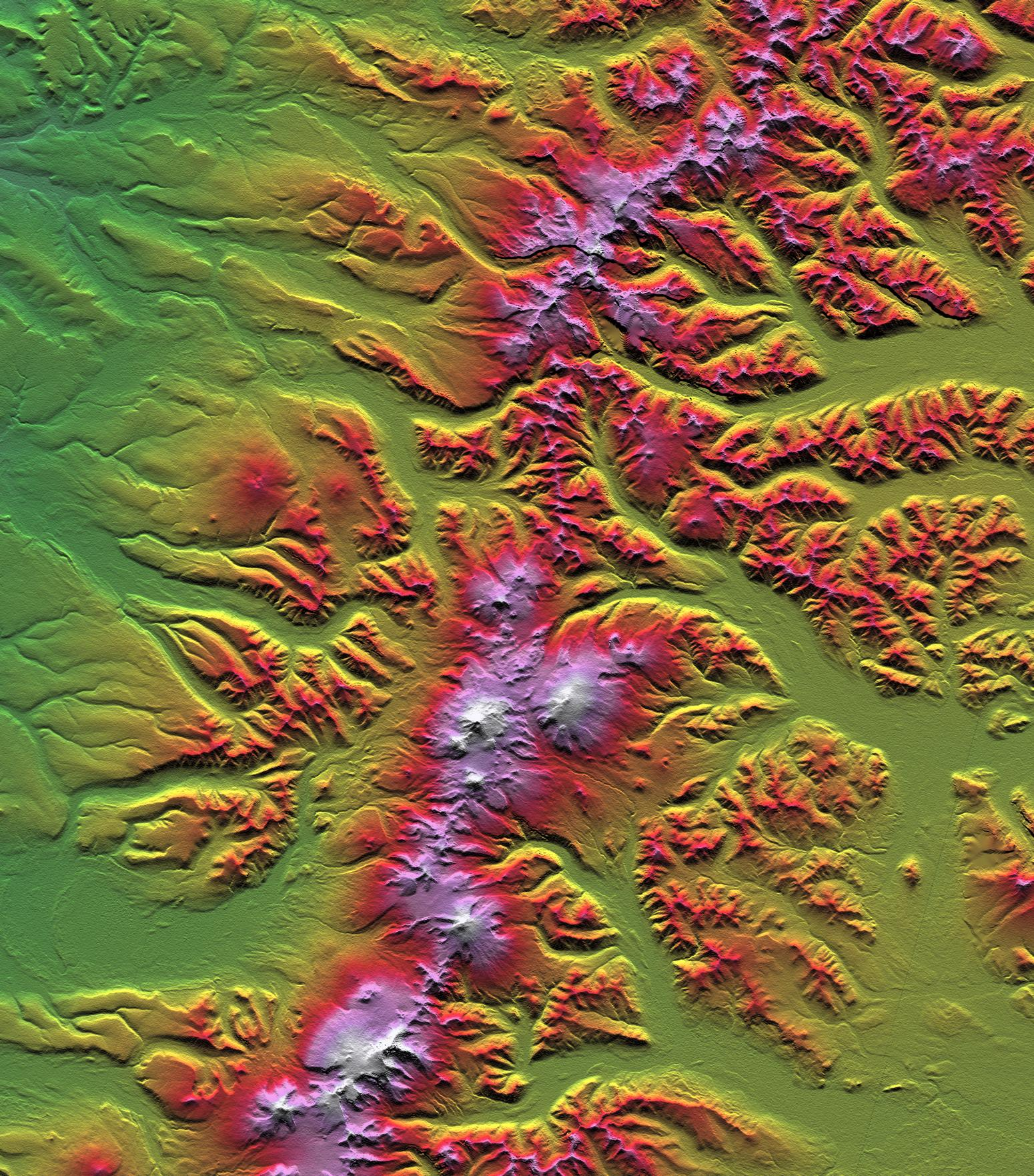

Highest point
- Peak: Ichinsky
- Elevation: 3,620 m (11,880 ft)
- Coordinates: 55°40′48″N 157°43′48″E

Naming
- Native name: Среди́нный хребе́т (Russian)

Geography
- Country: Russia
- Region: Kamchatka Krai

Sredinny Range (Russian: Среди́нный хребе́т, meaning Middle Range) is a mountain range on the Kamchatka Peninsula of Russia. It stretches from northeast to southwest along the center of the peninsula and is made up of volcanoes, mostly shield volcanoes and stratovolcanoes. The highest peak of the range is Ichinsky, a stratovolcano some 3,607 metres (11,834 ft) high. The Sredinny Range is separated from the north-south-running coastal Eastern Range (Vostochny) to the east, by the Central Kamchatka Depression.

The mountains are currently occupied by small mountain glaciers, contributing to Kamchatka's characterization as the most extensively glaciated region of northeastern Asia, with glaciers covering roughly 592 ± 20.4 km^{2}.
