= Golovnin Incident =

1811 capture of Vasily Golovnin by Tokugawa shogunate soldiers

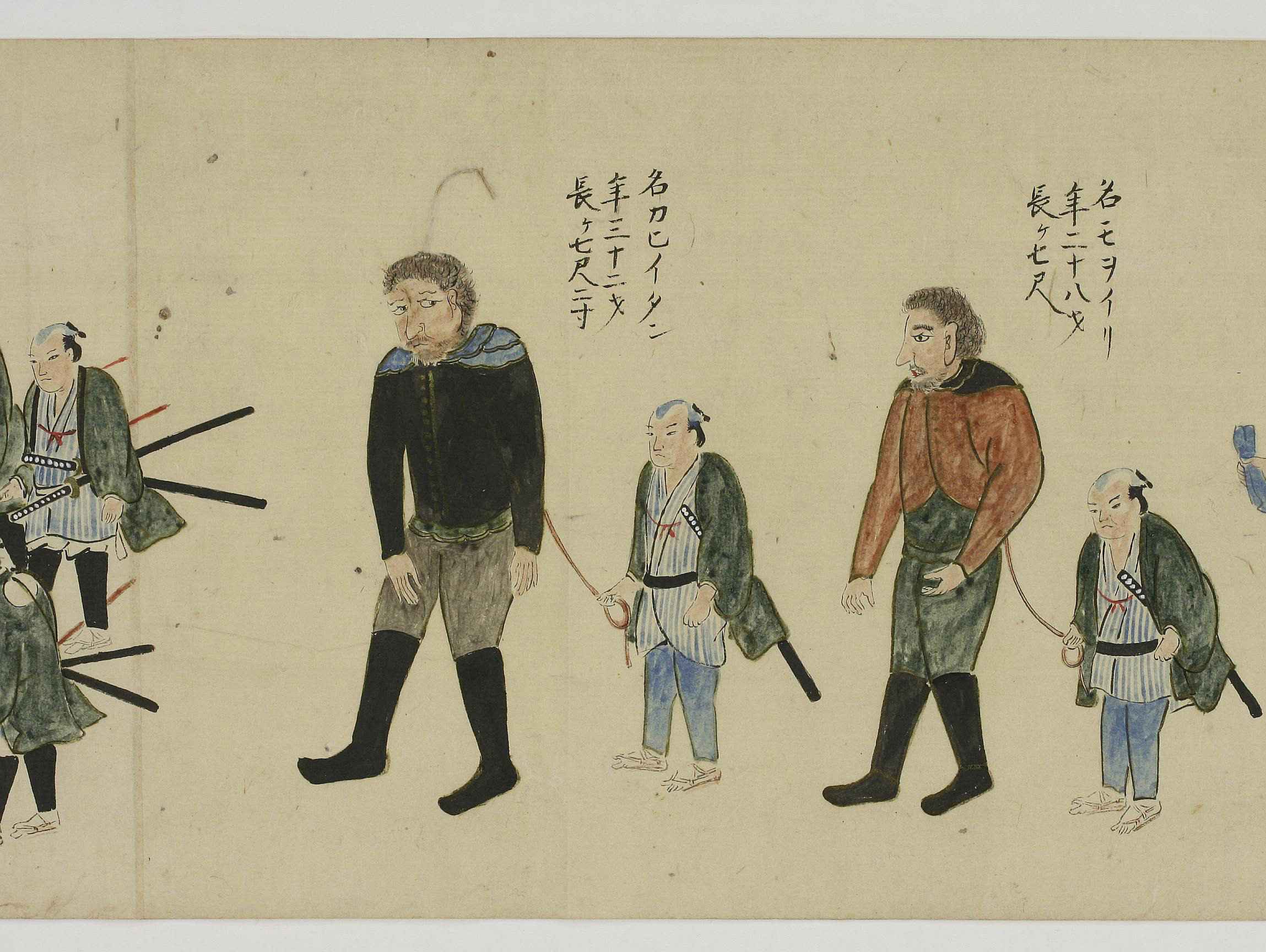
Vasily Golovnin taken prisoner

The Golovnin Incident involved the capture of the Russian explorer and naval captain Vasily Golovnin in 1811 by soldiers of the Japanese Tokugawa shogunate in accordance with Japan's policy of isolationism (Sakoku). Golovnin was interned in Japan for two years before he was released in 1813. The incident was an important flashpoint in Russo-Japanese relations over the control of the Kuril Islands. Golovnin's book Memoirs of a Captivity in Japan during the Years 1811, 1812 and 1813 with observations on the country and the people, recounted his captivity, was a popular work in Europe, and was translated into several languages.

== Original mission ==
In April 1811, the Russian minister of the Marine directed the sloop Diana to explore the Southern Kuril and Shantar Islands as well as the Tartary Coast. Golovnin had originally been dispatched from Kronstadt to the north-west of the Pacific in 1807 to chart the eastern coast of the Russian Empire.

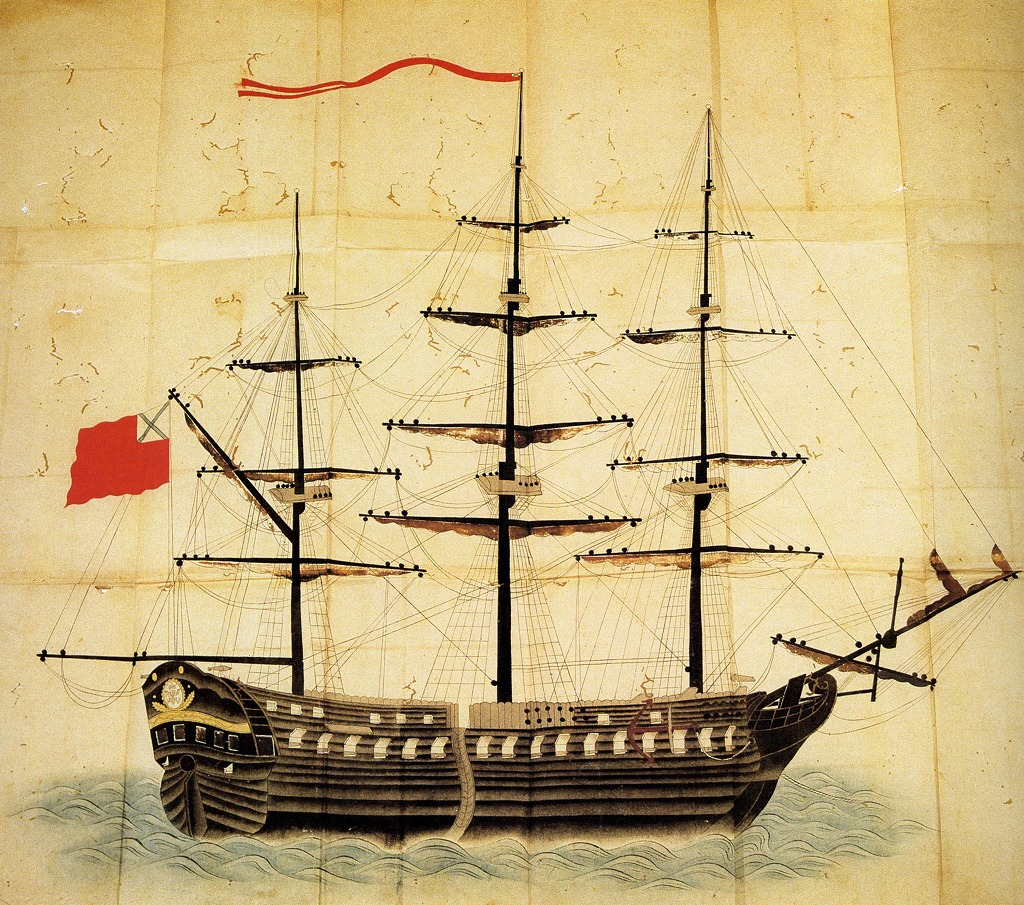
Japanese illustration of the sloop Diana

During the 18th century, Russian fur trappers had moved through Siberia towards the north-west of the Pacific, and some had even settled in the Kuril. Prior attempts to map the islands had proved difficult because of the mists that rose from the islands, as well as the strong winds. The expedition would sail in the summer when conditions would be optimal, and Golovnin would then continue to the Shantar Islands.

The Diana left Petropavlovsk-Kamchatsky on 25 April through the ice flows and set to sea from Avacha Bay on 4 May. Golovnin was conscientious of respecting relations between Russia and Japan, as his voyage came after several diplomatic incidents with Japan such as the castaway incident of Daikokuya Kōdayū in 1784, the Adam Laxman incident of 1791, and Nikolai Rezanov's failed trade mission in 1805. Rezanov then visited the United States and was brought back to Siberia by Lieutenant Khvostov in vessels belonging to the Russian-American Company but died when he reached Siberia in 1807. Khvostov, however, proceeded to raid Japanese villages in Sakhalin and the Kurils without the tsardom's authority.

The Diana sailed to the island of Eetooroop and made contact with a group of Ainu, or Kuriles, who had been sent by the Japanese to investigate the Europeans. Golovnin proceeded to meet the Japanese military commander of the island and declared his intention to collect wood and water and then to be on his way. The commander stated that he could not trust the Russians because of the actions of Khvostov. He agreed to send a letter to other commanders to grant them access to supplies at the town of 'Oorbeetsch'.

The Russians set sail, but were then intercepted by a baidara with the Kuriles on board, as well as a newcomer, Alexei Maximovitsch. Alexei joined the Russians as an interpreter though his proficiency in Russian was low.

Many of the Kuriles came from Russian-controlled islands and had been punished for Khvostov's attack on Japanese settlements which made them fear and resent the Japanese. Moreover, the Japanese had brutally crushed an Ainu rebellion in 1789.

== Capture ==
European explorers had not yet discovered Nemuro Strait between Hokkaido (Matsmai) and Kunashir, which prompted Golovnin to explore them on 4 July. As the Diana approached the harbour at Kunashir, it was fired upon by the Japanese castle. After several attempts, the Diana made contact with Japanese officers on the island. They offered the necessary supplies as well as a meeting with the island's bugyō, or governor. To clear the Russian government of responsibility from the Khvostov raids, Golovnin, two officers, four sailors, and the Kurile Alexei landed. There, they were met by the governor of Kunashir in his castle. Negotiations seemed amicable, but the Japanese had lured Golovnin onto the island and arrested him and the other crew members.

The crew was tightly bound with ropes, and the Diana, now under control of Petr Rikord, shot at the castle but was then forced to set sail to avoid capture. The captives were sailed across the straits to Hokkaido and encountered many villagers, who were curious to see the Russians, because of the almost-complete absence of foreigners in Japan. A Japanese drawing of their captivity shows the Russians' tall stature compared to the Japanese, which was also confirmed by Golovnin. The crew was led to a prison in Hakodate, the capital of Hokkaido.

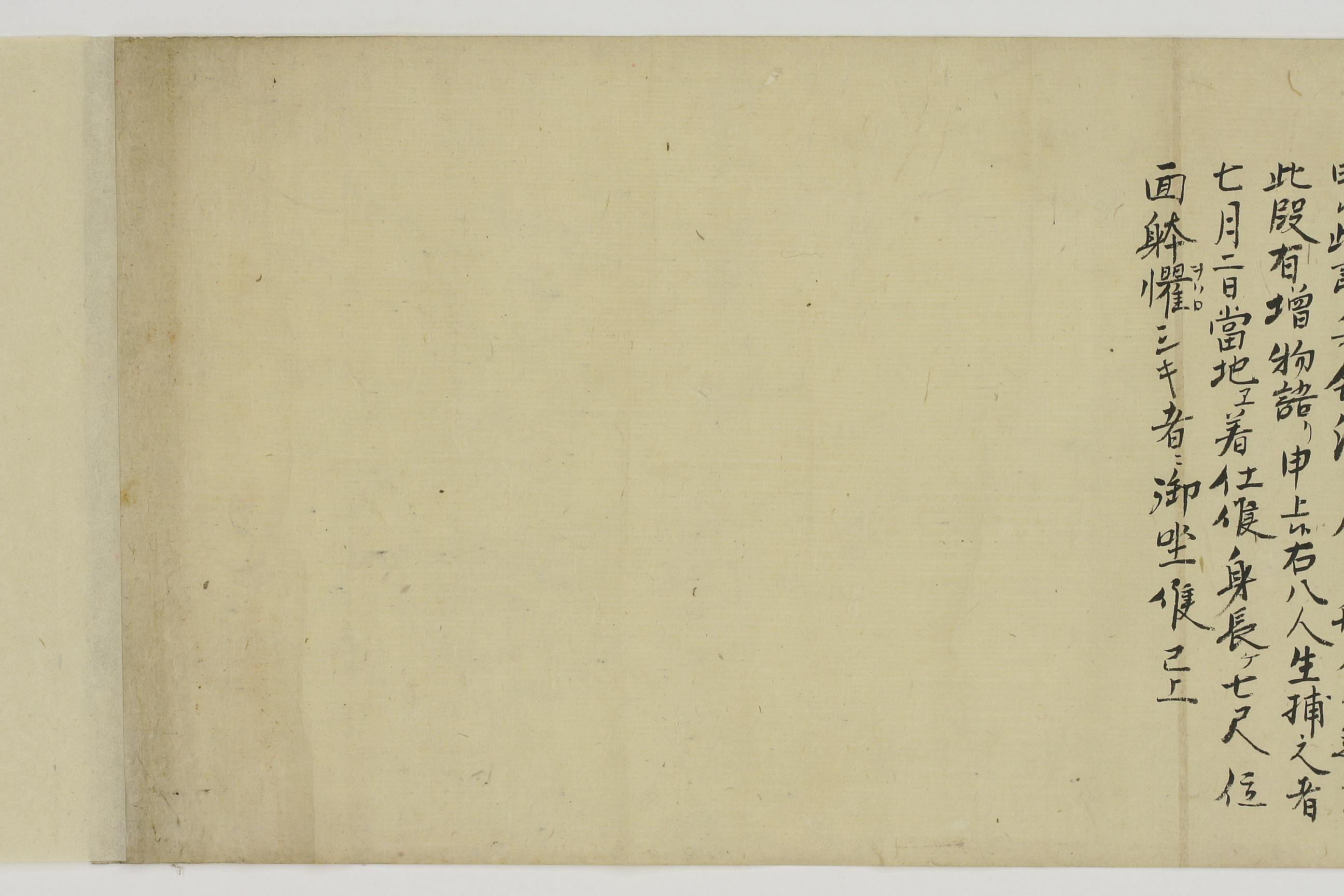
Capture of Russians and Vasily Golovnin by Tokugawa c1811 Part 9

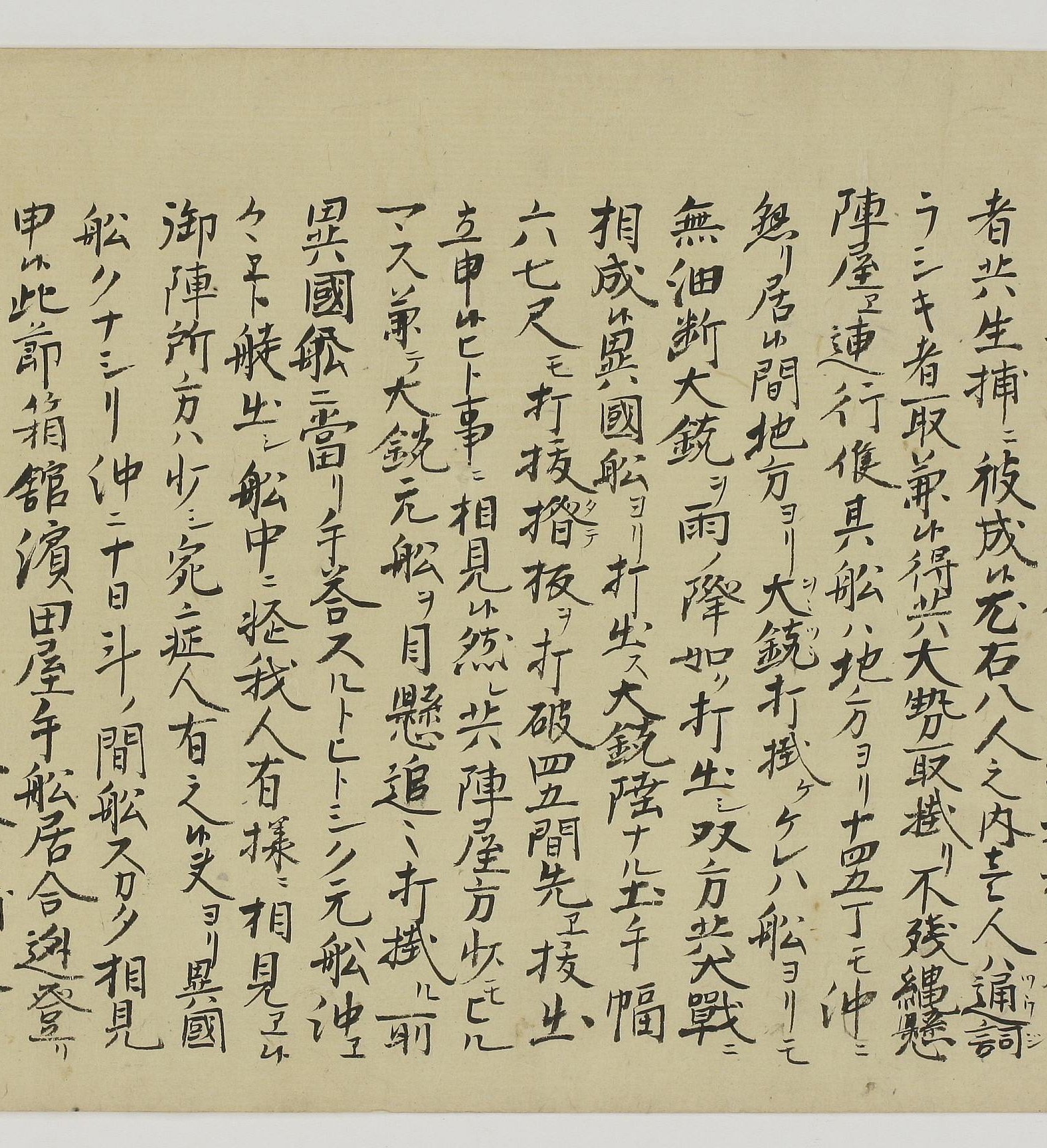
Capture of Russians and Vasily Golovnin by Tokugawa c1811 Part 8

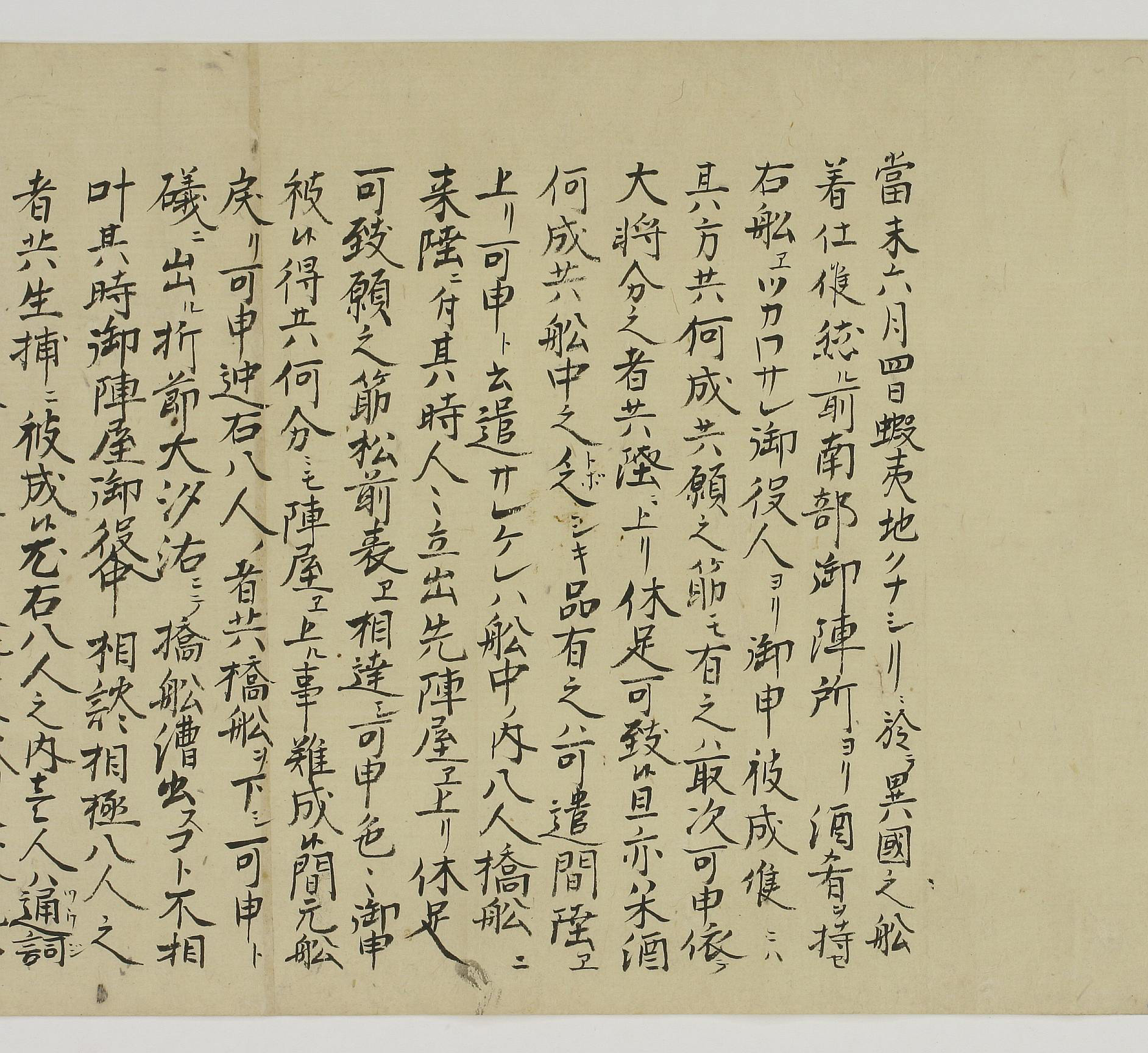
Capture of Russians and Vasily Golovnin by Tokugawa c1811 Part 7

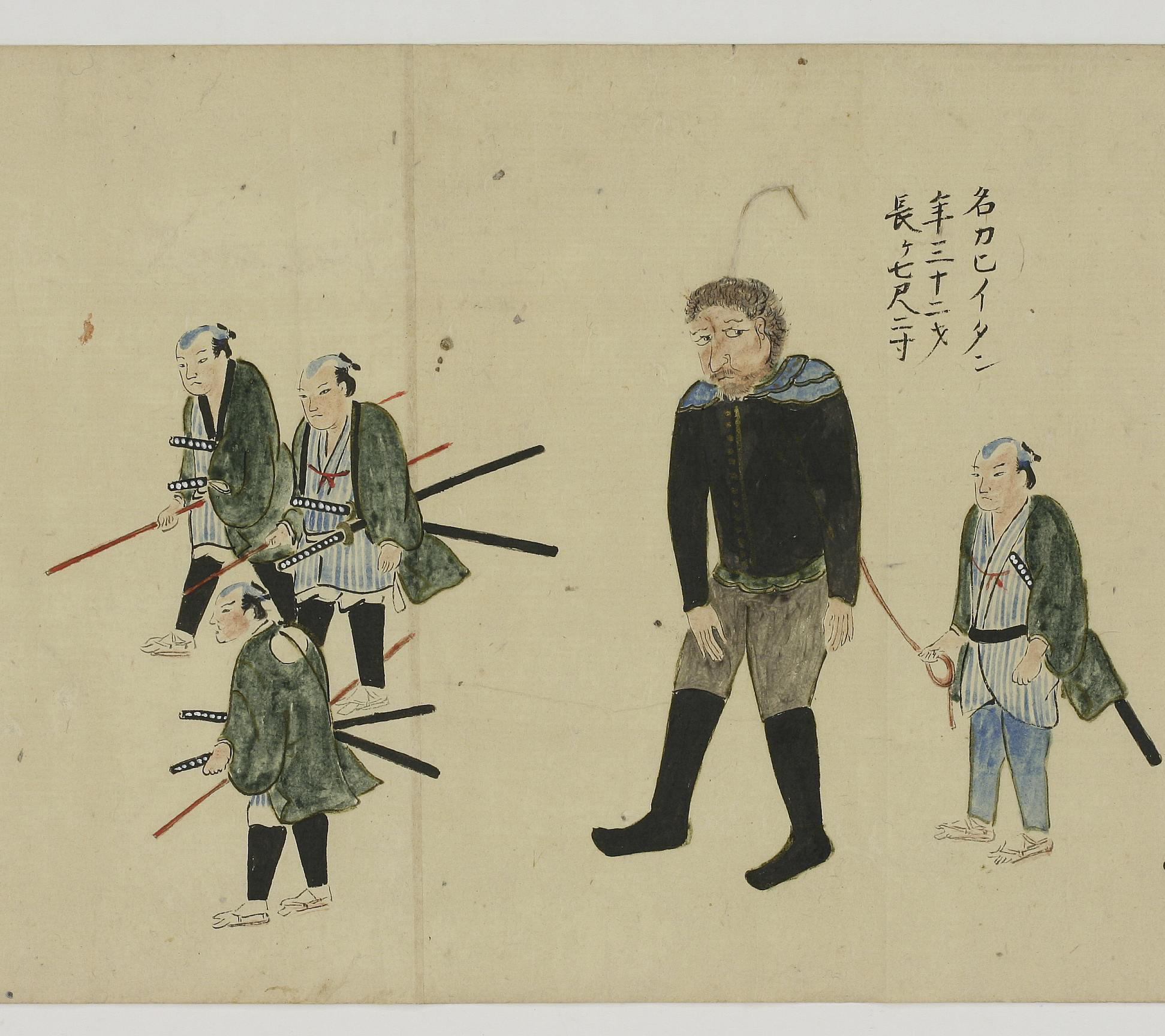
Capture of Russians and Vasily Golovnin by Tokugawa c1811 Part 6

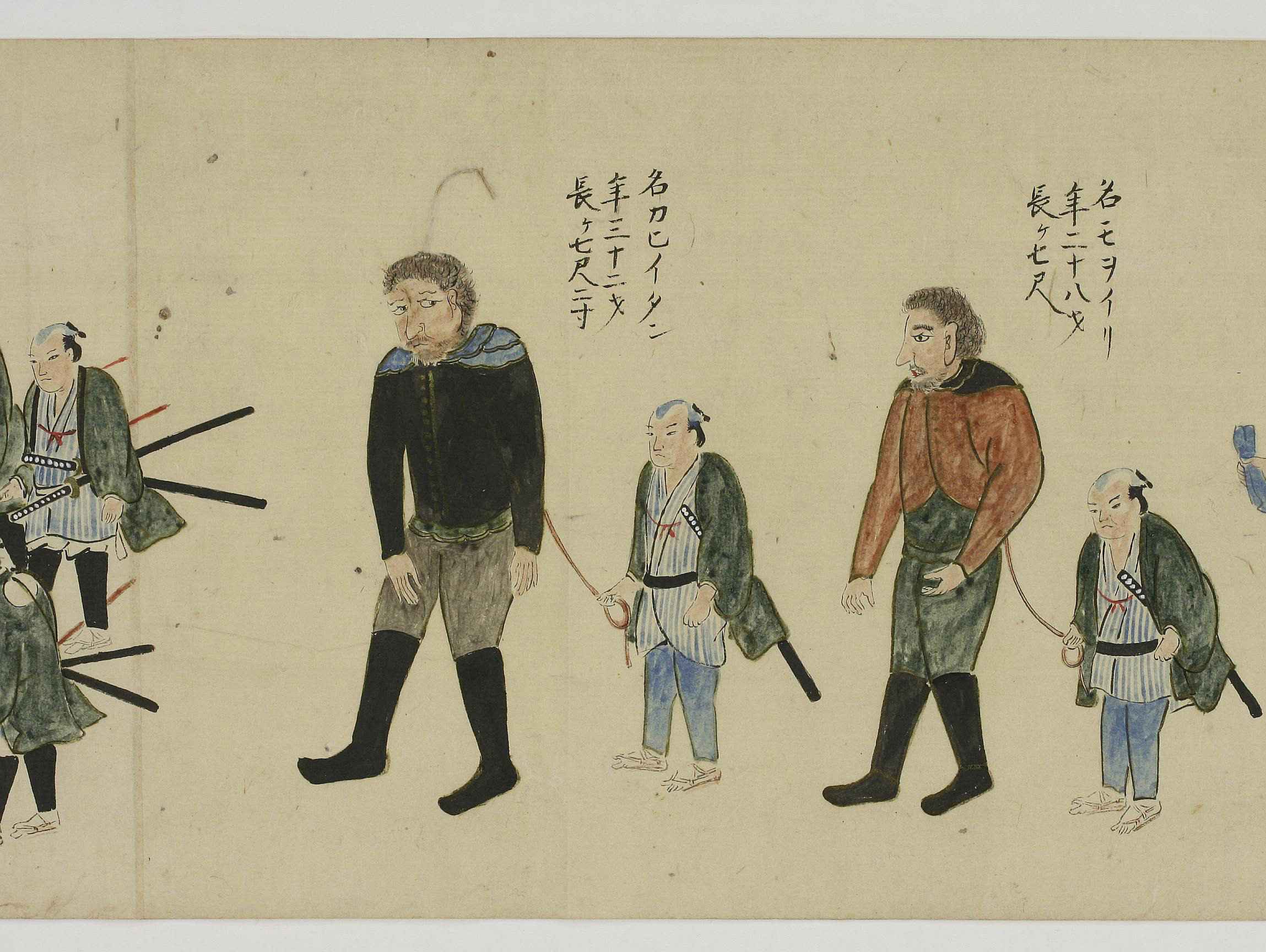
Capture of Russians and Vasily Golovnin by Tokugawa c1811 Part 5

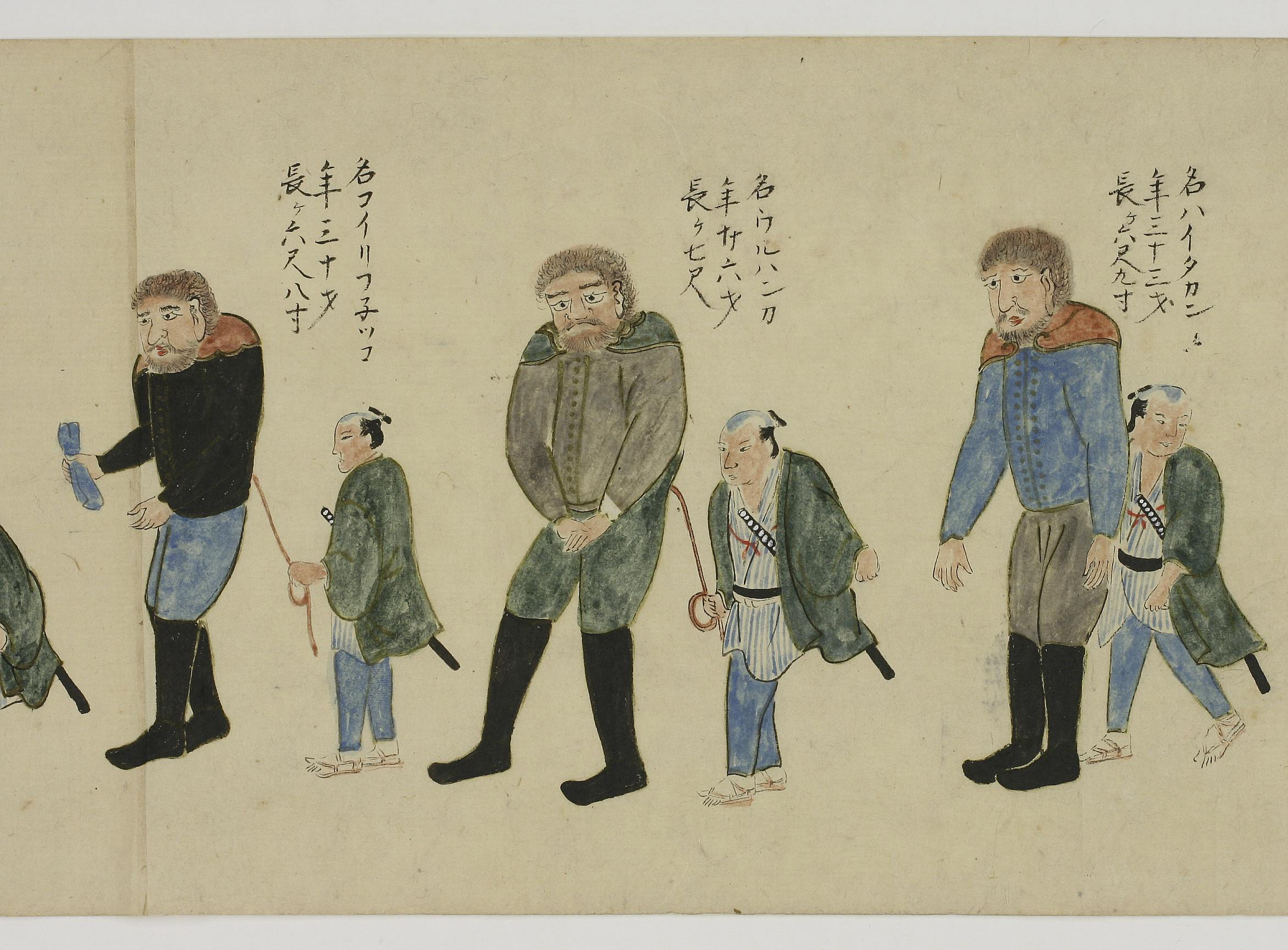
Capture of Russians and Vasily Golovnin by Tokugawa c1811 Part 4

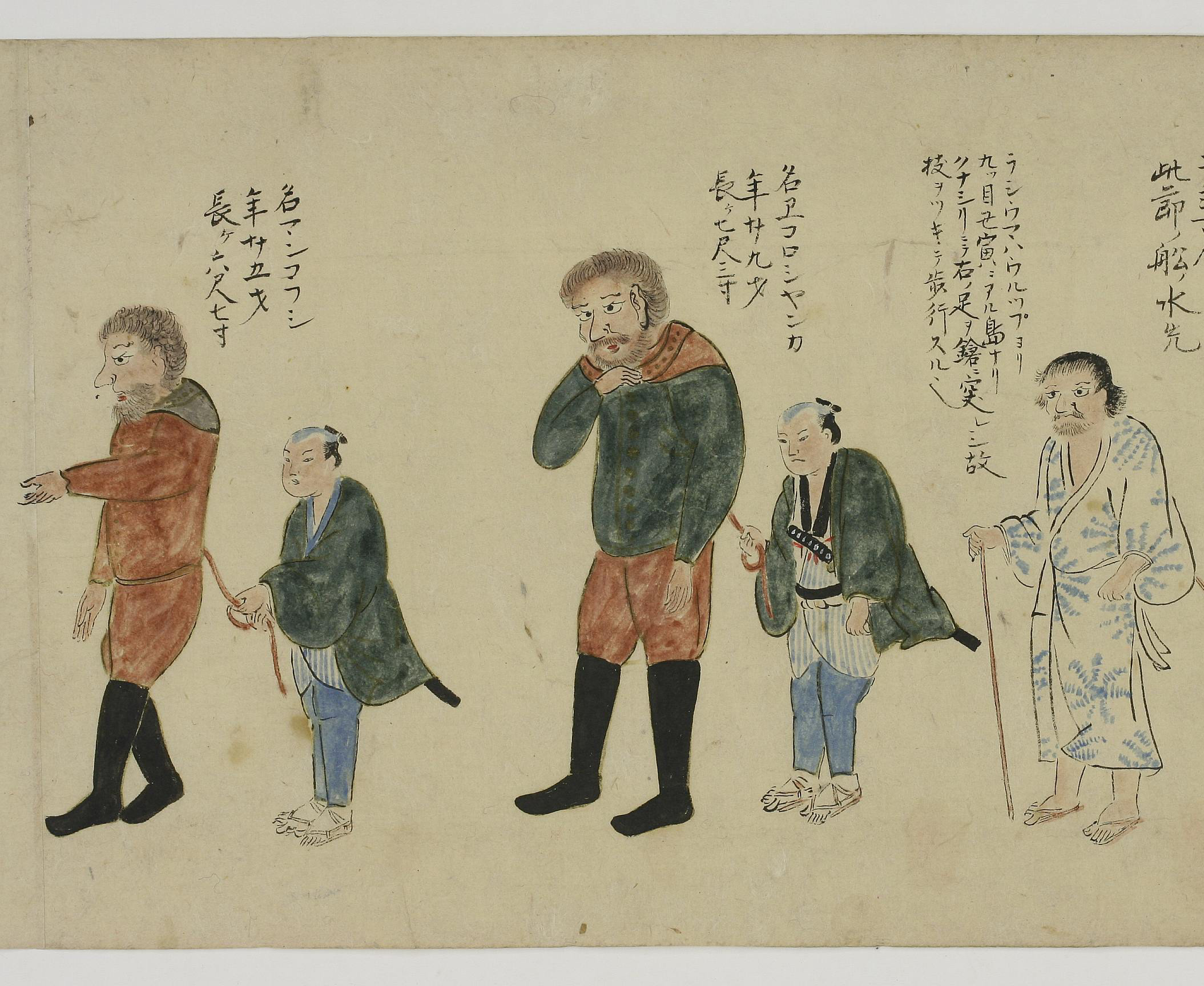
Capture of Russians and Vasily Golovnin by Tokugawa c1811 Part 3

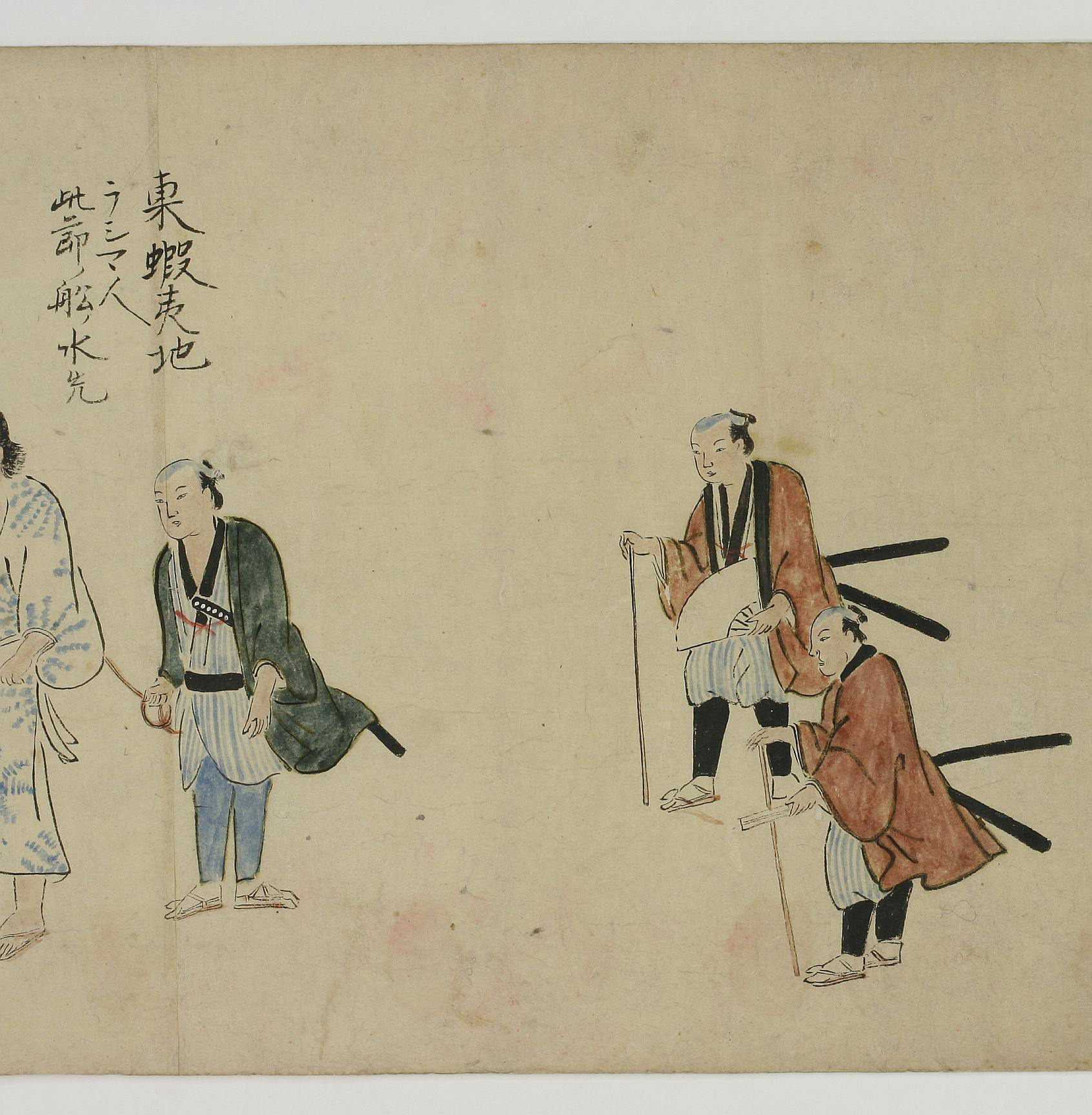
Capture of Russians and Vasily Golovnin by Tokugawa c1811 Part 2

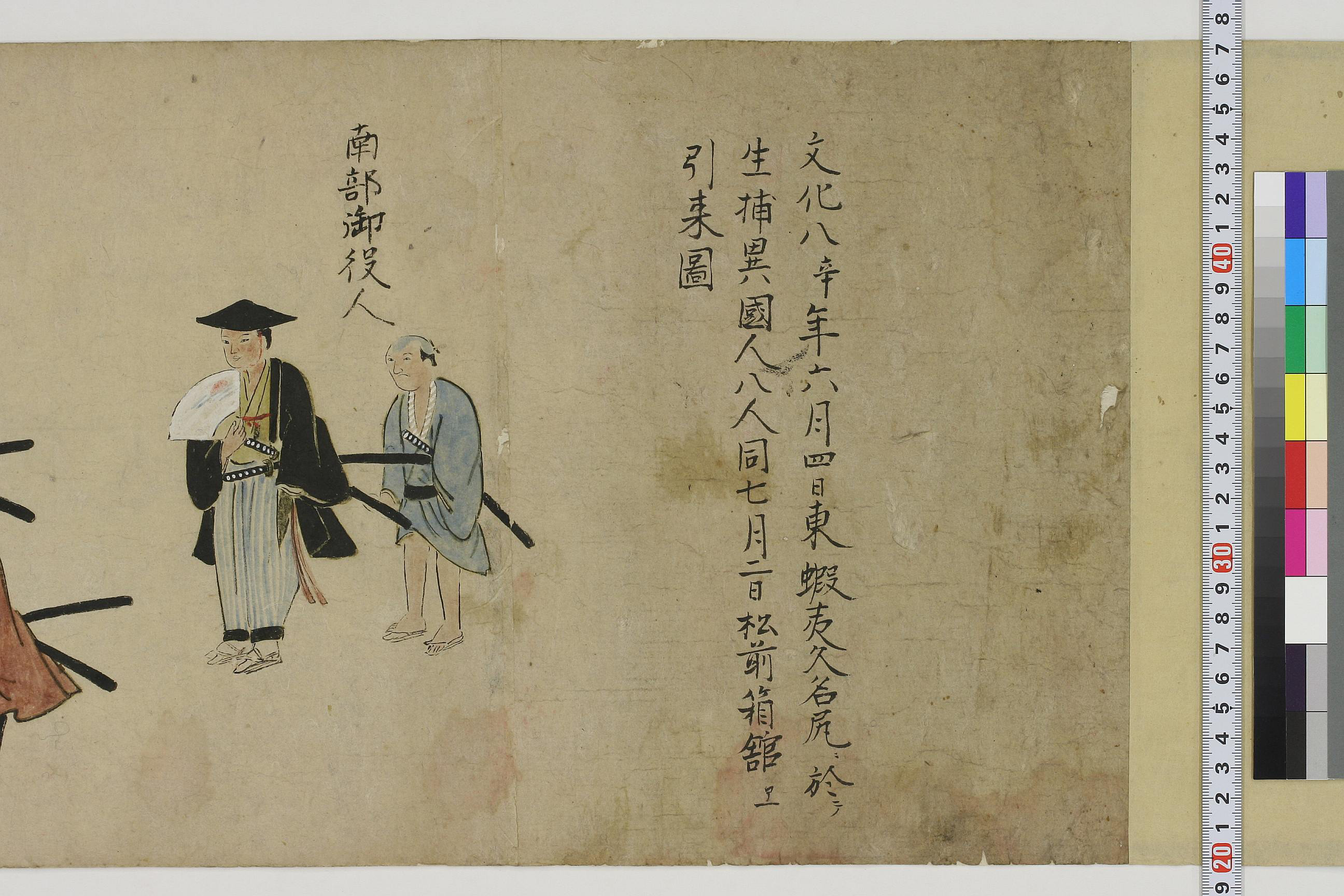
Capture of Russians and Vasily Golovnin by Tokugawa c1811 Part 1

== Captivity ==
The crew were kept in separate cells in a well-guarded wooden prison. During the imprisonment, the Japanese began interrogating the officers with many precise questions that revealed the lack of knowledge of both cultures toward each other. On 25 August, the commander brought Golovnin his personal wares from his cabin on the Diana, much to his surprise. However the Diana had not been captured but had simply sent these items ashore. He was later brought before the governor of Hokkaido and made to discuss the events that had taken place by Resanov and Khvostov. The governor handed him a letter from the remaining officers of the Diana; they explained why they could not save them in the Kurils and that they would work towards their release. Golovnin was also provided with another letter that had been written in 1806 by Khvostov and stated that he had annexed the island of Sakhalin in the name of the tsar. The Japanese had also annexed Sakhalin in 1807 in fear of growing Russian interference. The letter convinced many of the Japanese that Golovnin was a Russian spy. The Japanese continued pressing questions to Golovnin, and he and the crew were moved to a new prison in Matsumae.

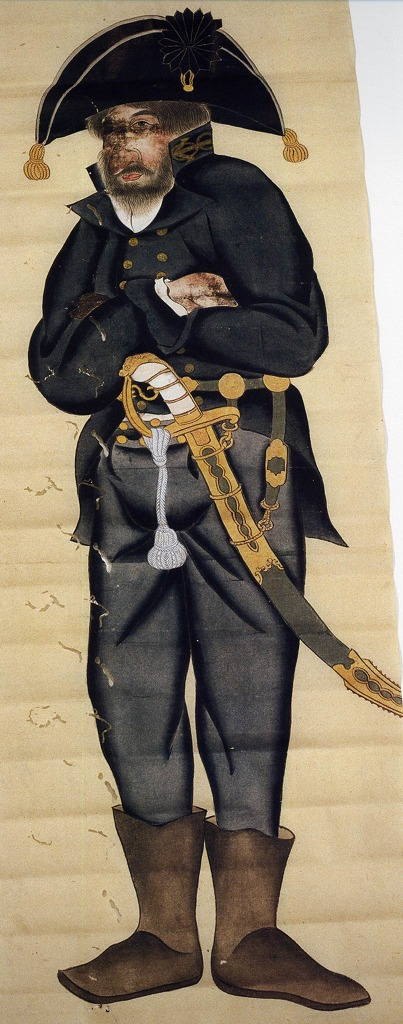
Japanese Illustration of Golovnin

After in depth interrogations for weeks, the governor of Hokkaido contacted the central government in Edo to ask whether the Russians could be released. In response, the Japanese government sent a scholar called Teske (a Dutch-speaker) to try to learn Russian, to question the Russians, and finally to make their portraits. The government also sent the renowned explorer Mamiya Rinzō, who had been wounded in the skirmish with Khvostov on Etrop, to discover more about Russia's presence in the north-west of the Pacific.

== Escape attempt ==
Golovnin and his crew began plotting to escape (despite a great improvement of their treatment by the Japanese). However, one of the officers of German origin, Moor, had resolved to stay and pursue a life in Japan and had made significant progress in learning the Japanese language. In March 1812, the Governor received a letter stating new orders from Edo to burn any Russian ships and to imprison their crews. Golovnin and the crew, without Moor, decided to make their escape into the mountains. The crew went through the mountains to the shore to find a boat to commandeer but were arrested after eight days by soldiers and brought back into imprisonment. The new governor Oga-Sawara-Isseno-Kami, presented another letter from Khvostov stating that his attack had been motivated by Japan's refusal to open trade with Russia. They were forgiven for their escape attempt and moved back to more comfortable lodging.

== Release ==
After Golovnin's capture, Rikord returned to Kamchatka to gain permission to attempt to rescue. That was granted by the governor of Kamchatka, and he had a document condemning Khvostov's raid given to him. He then attempted contact with the Japanese on Kunashir and was met with cannon fire and the message that all of the captured Russians were dead. On 9 September 1812, in retaliation for the capture of Golovnin, Commander Pyotr Ivanovich Ricord of the Diana detained the Japanese ship Kansai Maru and took captive the wealthy merchant Takadaya Kahei as well as symbolically retaining four other Japanese and a Kurile and releasing the rest of the crew on Kunashir. Takadaya was taken to Kamchatka, where he would remain in custody for the rest of the winter. That action brought the two countries on the brink of war. In March, 1813 a new governor arrived who prohibited firing on Russian ships. To assure the Russians of their continuing survival, Golovnin and Moor wrote to Rikord to inform them that they were still alive. However, two of the Japanese and one of the Ainu had died in captivity in Kamchatka, seemingly of scurvy. Moor, scared of retaliation by the Russians when he was released, endeavoured to upset the exchange of prisoners by warning that the Russians would attack the Japanese. Negotiations were made between Rikord, the governor of Hokkaido, and the Japanese government in Edo in which the Japanese were convinced that Khvostov's action had not been condoned by the Russian government and that the crew of the Diana had gone to the Kurils without bad intent towards the Japanese. Takadaya Kahei was released on 29 July as a show of good intentions by Rikord. An agreement was finally reached to negotiate with Rikord and offer safe passage to the Diana and Golovnin was released from prison in August 1813 with copies of all their negotiations with the Japanese as well as those of Resanov and Laxman to present to the Russian government. The Diana arrived in late September. After deliberations with the governor, Golovnin and his crew were officially released on 6 October.

== Aftermath ==
Golovnin's parting with the Japanese was amiable, both sides exchanged gifts, and Rikord hosted a party on board the Diana for the Japanese. The crew returned to Petropavlovsk, but in despair and possibly madness, Moor committed suicide. The crew returned to St. Petersburg in 1814 and were rewarded for their service.

The Golovnin incident did not establish a renaissance in diplomacy between Europe and Japan, with the Japanese becoming increasingly fearful of the growing European presence in East Asia. In 1825, the Japanese government enacted the Edict to Repel Foreign Vessels (異国船打払令 Ikokusen Uchiharairei), requiring the burning of all European ships and the execution of their crews if they were to land outside of Nagasaki.
