= Takadaya Kahei =

Japanese merchant (1769–1827)

- 高田屋 嘉兵衛
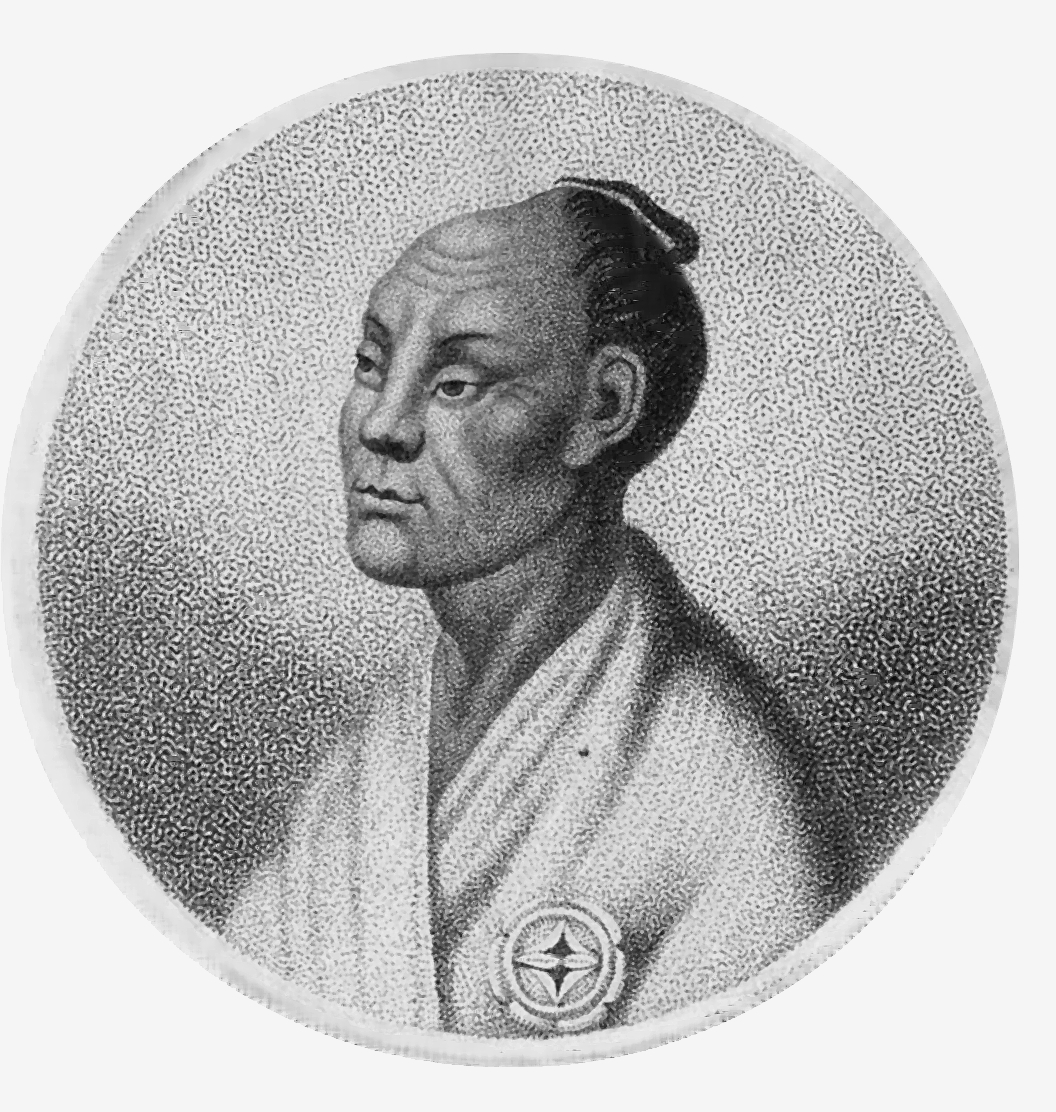
- Takadaya Kahei, drawn by a member of the Golovnin expedition, c. 1813
- Born: February 7, 1769; Awaji Island, Japan
- Died: April 30, 1827 (aged 58); Hakodate, Hokkaido, Japan
- Occupation: Merchant

Takadaya Kahei (高田屋 嘉兵衛) was a Japanese merchant credited with transforming the trading outpost of Hakodate in Japan's northern island of Hokkaidō into a thriving city. He is also recognised for opening the northern Etorofu sea route to the Kuril island fisheries and helping settle territorial disputes with Russia over the islands.

Takadaya Kahei was born to a farming family, but left his birthplace when was 13, to work in Kobe as a sailor. He earned sufficient money to purchase his own Kitamaebune trading ship and sailed to Hakodate in the summer of 1796. He set up a business in the town, which at the time was a small trading outpost. He is reputed to have made a fortune through trade by importing sake, salt, rice and other staples to Ezochi (the Japanese area of Hokkaidō) and exporting herring, salmon and kelp to Honshū. He later developed trading routes to the Kuril Islands and operated many fisheries around Nemuro, a town on Hokkaidō's east coast. Takadaya is also known for his services in developing Hakodate. He repaired streets, cultivated the land and forested trees for lumber. After a destructive fire in 1806 he provided food, clothing and new housing for victims of the disaster. He also paid for workmen from Osaka to sink new wells and donated water pumps for fire fighting.

He acquired a status as one of the most famous merchants in the era for his role in the Golovnin Incident. In 1812, during a dispute over the Kuril Island territorial waters, Takadaya Kahei was captured by Petr Rikord, captain of the Russian navy sloop in retaliation for the Japanese capture of explorer Vasily Golovnin. Along with his four sailors who were also captured on board the Kanze-maru, Takadaya was confined to Kamchatka for several months, his release finally secured through diplomacy. During his imprisonment he learned the Russian language and later worked with Vasily Golovnin to settle the Kuril Islands territorial border between the two countries.

At the age of 50, Takadaya returned to his birthplace of Awaji Island. He died in 1827.

A festival is held in Hakodate every year in late July to commemorate Takadaya Kahei.
