= Khvostov Incident =

1806 military offensive against Japanese outposts

The Khvostov Incident (Russian: Инцидент Хвостова), called the Bunka Russian invasion (Japanese: 文化露寇, romanized: Bunka rokō) in Japan, refers to a series of raids and clashes by Russian Lieutenant Nikolai Alexeyevich Khvostov of the Russian-American Company against Japanese outposts on the islands of Iturup (Etorofu) and Sakhalin in 1806–1807. Khvostov ordered his subordinate Nikolai Rezanov to attack the Japanese with his envoy..

== Background ==
By the late 18th century, Russian explorers and traders had begun venturing farther east, probing territories near the northern borders of Japan. The Tokugawa government, adhering to strict maritime restrictions, remained wary of foreign incursion. Relations were further complicated by limited diplomatic channels and misunderstandings regarding territorial boundaries in Sakhalin and the Kurils.

In the late Edo period, a diplomatic mission from Russia visited Japan, which was isolated from the rest of the world. The purpose was to negotiate trade between Japan and Russia, but the Edo Shogunate refused.

== The incident ==
Angered by the Shogunate's stubborn and disrespectful attitude, Nikolai Rezanov, a diplomatic envoy, ordered his subordinates Khvostov and others to attack Japan's northern bases in Iturup and Sakhalin.

In September 1806, Khvostov and his men attacked a Japanese settlement along Aniva Bay in Sakhalin on the frigate Yunona. First, on September 11, about 20 people landed and captured an Ainu boy (later released). On the 12th, 30 people landed and captured four Japanese men, looted rice, salt, nets, iron kettles, cotton cloth, and other supplies, and set fire to houses on the 16th. Masu. As the means of communication by ship were cut off due to this attack, the Edo Shogunate had to wait until the following year for the incident to be reported.

Subsequently, on April 23, 1807, Khvostov and Davydov led an expedition on the ships Yuno and Avos, arriving at Naibo Bay, west of Iturup Island. At first, they had friendly relations with the Japanese, but on April 25, they captured five prisoners and took them to a ship, looted the Japanese residences of tools and clothes, and set them on fire.

On the Japanese side, as soon as they learned of the Naibo attack, officials from the shogunate, Morioka clan, Hirosaki clan, and others gathered at the Shana hall for a military council. Rinzo Mamiya, who was there for the survey at the time, also participated and advocated a complete resistance. The Shogunate army numbered about 300 people.

On April 29th, they set up their headquarters at Kaisho and fought with guns against the Russian soldiers who came out from the ship, but they were completely destroyed. In the end, the Japanese army decided to abandon Shana and left in the night, led by their superiors, but in the process Matatayu Toda, a sub-inspector at the Hakodate Magistrate's Office, committed suicide. This defeat would later lead to criticism of the shogunate.

On May 1st, about 40 Russians had landed. They violently bombarded the hall with cannons, looted weapons, clothing, food, and alcohol, and captured the Japanese. After the looting was completed, the Kaisho and the Morioka domain camp were burnt down.

Khvostov departed from Shana on May 3rd, passed through Sakhalin and Aniva Bay, and landed on Rishiri Island, where he burned down banyas and warehouses. Furthermore, on Rishiri Island, 8 of the 10 prisoners were released after presenting a written request to the shogunate. The demand letter contained threatening statements such as, "I asked for trade, but since there was no response, I showed them my plans" and "If my wish for trade is not granted, I will send more ships and do the same thing". It is a threat to use force. In addition, they have also informed us that they are planning to return to Japan this year.

Khvostov and Davydov then left Japan and returned to Okhotsk with their plunder in June. However, what awaited him was an arrest. He was accused of carrying out military operations without permission from the emperor, and was arrested by Bukharin, the local governor, and was treated harshly. After escaping, the two men demanded a trial, asserting their innocence and the harsh treatment they received from Bukharin. They then took part in the Second Swedish War, and in 1809, both men were killed in an anncident on a bridge in Saint Petersburg.

After the Edo shogunate was defeated on Iturup Island, the Hakodate magistrate requested support from the Morioka, Hirosaki, Akita, and Tsuruoka domains, and as a result, a total of 3,000 soldiers were assembled to protect Ezochi. In addition, at the end of 1807, the Edo shogunate issued an order to destroy Russian ships. He ordered the Nanbu, Tsugaru, Sendai, and Aizu domains to dispatch troops.

== Consequences ==
In July 1811, the Japanese garrison of Kunashir captured the Russian navigator Golovnin and his companions. They were released only in 1813 through the mediation of Takadai Kaheya after the Japanese received assurances from the Russian authorities that the actions of Khvostov and Davydov were arbitrary.
