= Golovnin =

Volcano on Kunashir of the Kuril Islands

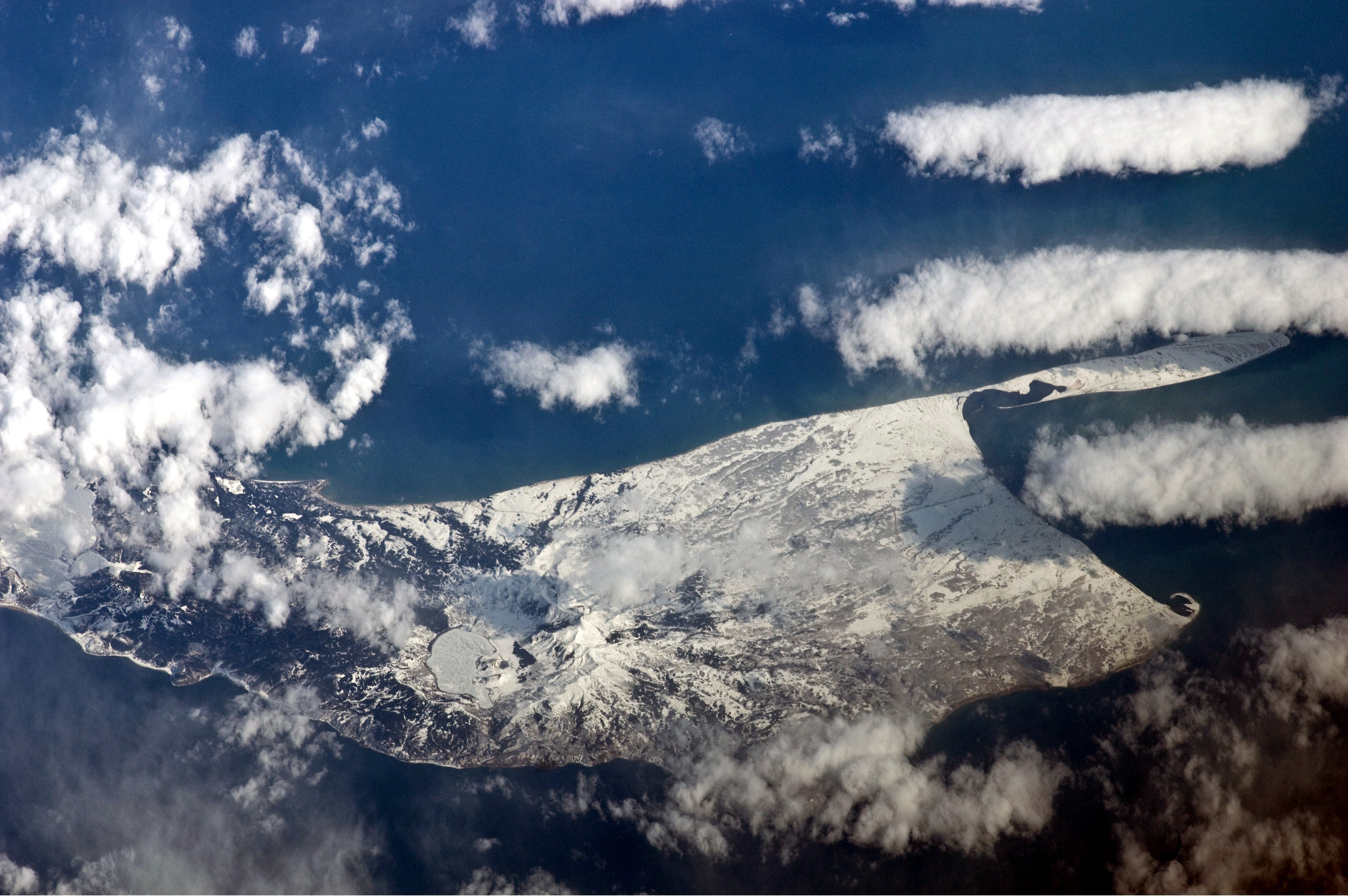

Highest point
- Elevation: 535 m (1,755 ft)
- Coordinates: 43.841°N 145.509°E

Geography
- Location within Far Eastern Federal District
- Location: Kunashir, Kuril Islands, Russia/Japan

Geology
- Mountain type: Lava domes / Caldera
- Last eruption: 1848

Golovnin (Japanese: 泊山, Tomari-yama; Russian: вулкан Головнина) is a caldera located in the southern part of Kunashir Island, Kuril Islands, Russia/Japan. It is the southernmost volcano of the Kuril Islands.

The Russian name is given after the Russian explorer Vasily Golovnin.

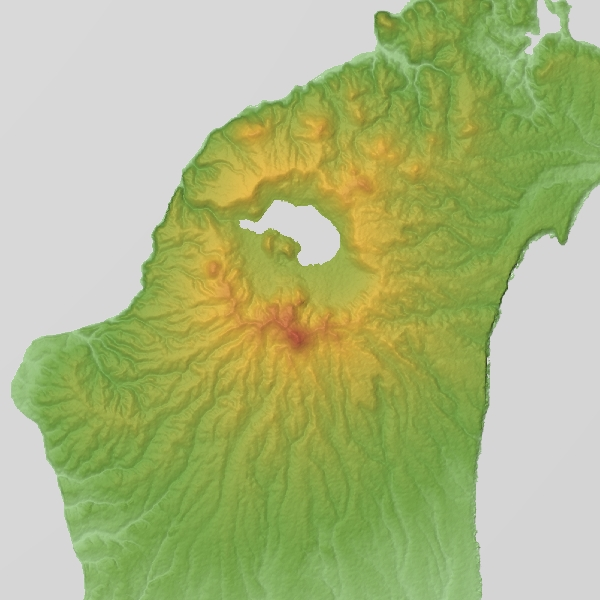
Golovnin Volcano

An eruption was confirmed in 1848. It is not ranked as an active volcano by the Japan Meteorological Agency.Tomariyama Volcanic activity since recorded history

== See also ==
- List of volcanoes in Russia
