= Mendeleyeva =

Stratovolcano on Kunashir Island, Russia

- Rausu-san
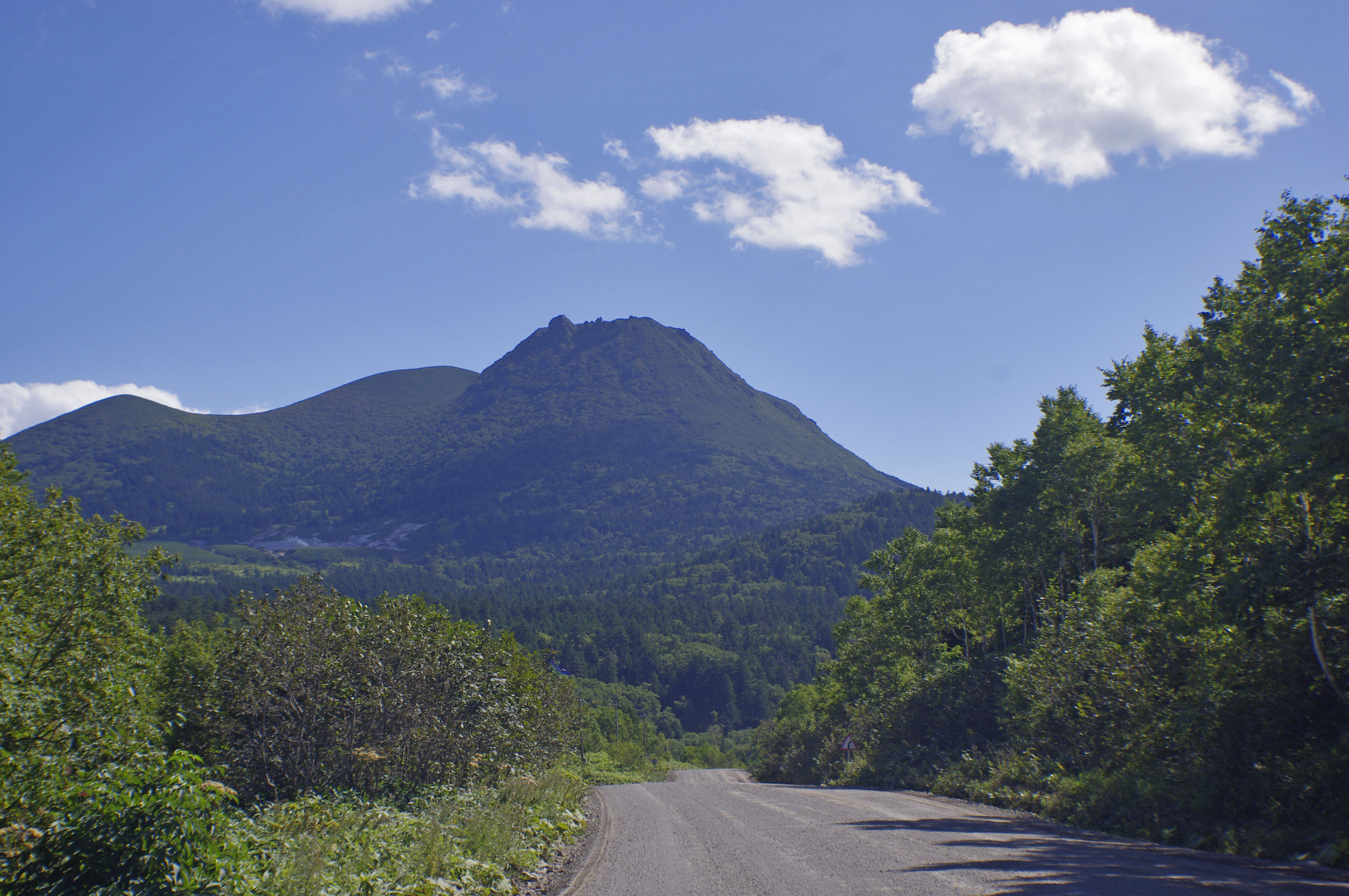
- Northwestern face of the volcano

Highest point
- Elevation: 882 m (2,894 ft)
- Coordinates: 43.976°N 145.736°E

Geography
- Location within Far Eastern Federal District
- Location: Kunashir, Kuril Islands, Russia

Geology
- Mountain type: Stratovolcano
- Last eruption: 1880

Mendeleyeva (Russian: вулка́н Менделе́ева; Japanese: 羅臼山, Rausu-san) is a stratovolcano located in the southern part of Kunashir Island, Kuril Islands, Russia.

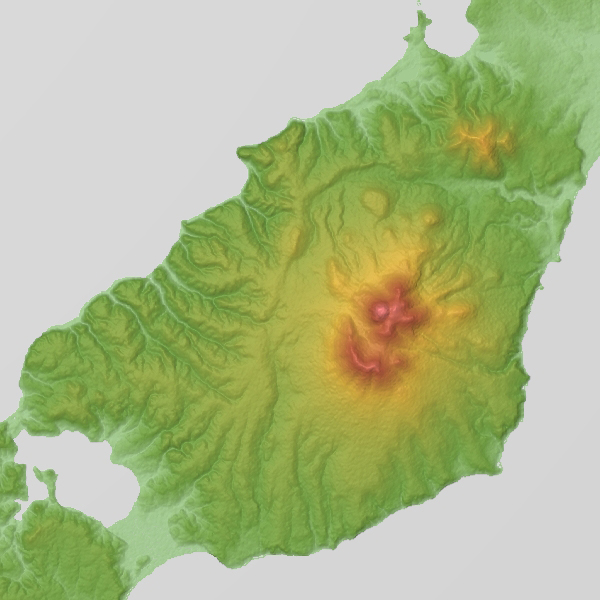
Relief map

The dominantly andesitic-dacitic volcano is cut by two nested calderas, the larger 6–7 km in diameter and the smaller 3-3.5 km. A central cone that formed inside the younger caldera was breached to the west by a large debris avalanche about 4200 years ago. A lava dome that grew inside the avalanche scarp forms the 888 m high point of the volcano. Additional lava domes in the northern part of the older caldera are considered to represent flank activity of the younger caldera.

The only unambiguous historical eruption was a small phreatic eruption in 1880. Four solfatara fields lie at the eastern and northern flanks of the central cone. Goriachy Pliazh geothermal field is located outside the caldera, along the eastern coast.

== See also ==
- List of volcanoes in Russia
