= Zemlyak =

Russian political group active in the 1990s

- Земляк
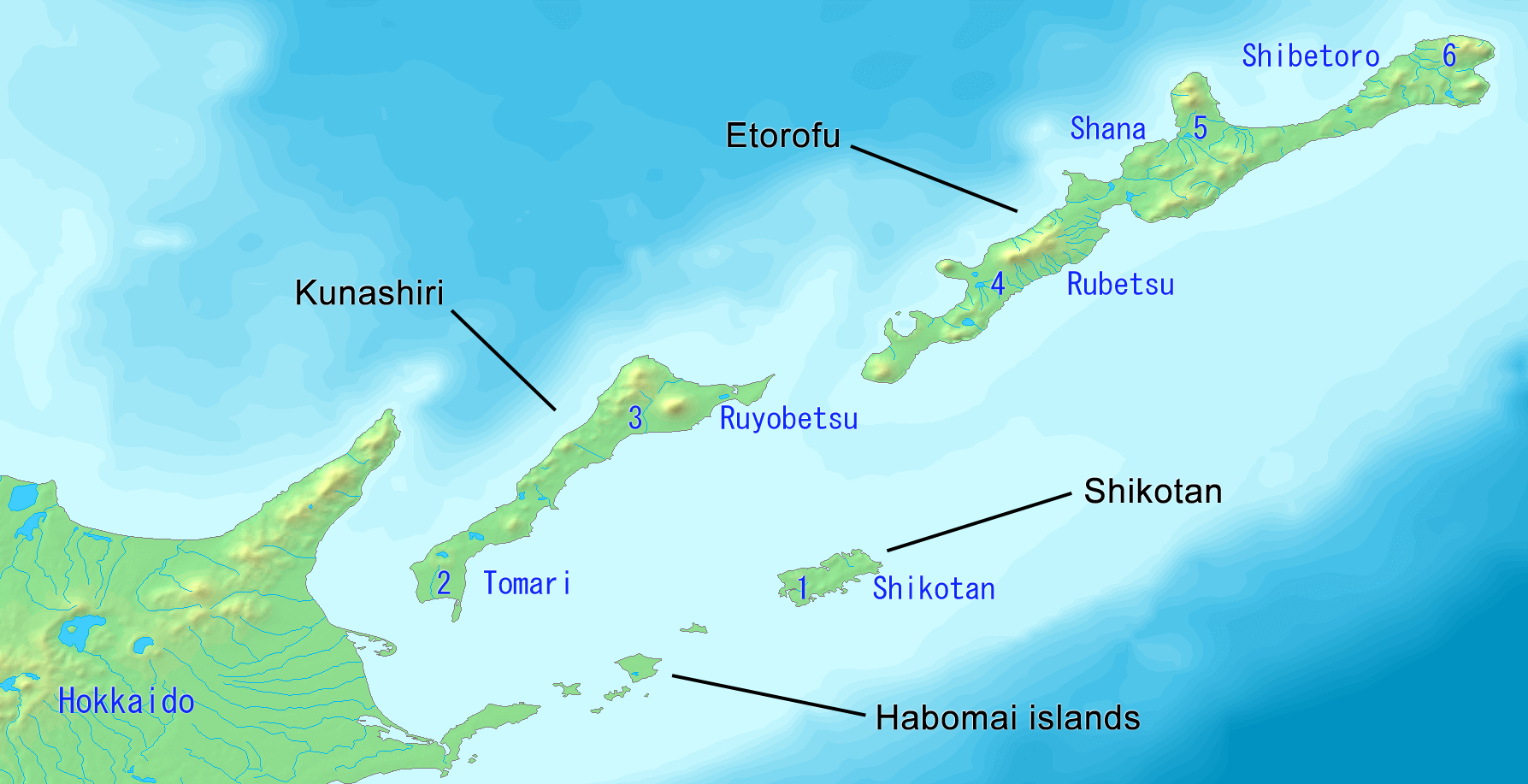
- Map of the four southernmost Kuril Islands, claimed by Japan as its "Northern Territories"
- Formation: 1992
- Founder: Mikhail Lukyanov
- Headquarters: Kunashir

Zemlyak (Russian: Земляк, lit. 'Countryman') was a Russian political group active in the 1990s that advocated the return of the Kuril Islands to Japan. It was founded in 1992 by Mikhail Lukyanov, the then chairman of the Kunashir Council of Deputies. The Soviet Union, which seized the Kuril Islands after the Allies' victory over Japan in World War II, had just dissolved in 1991. Lukyanov believed that Kunashir would have better economic prospects as part of Japan than post-Soviet Russia. He argued that the Kuril Islands dispute was the main obstacle to financial investments in Kunashir from both countries, citing Russian fiscal transfers and Japanese investments to other parts of the Russian Far East to support his argument.

The group was unpopular among locals in Kunashir, who criticized Lukyanov's "pro-Japanese position". Lukyanov petitioned the United Nations to transfer sovereignty over the Kuril Islands from Russia to Japan, to no avail. He later applied for political asylum in Japan, but his application was rejected. At its peak, the group claimed a membership of 300. The group faded into obscurity after the 1990s, and in 2019 Lukyanov was reportedly living as a recluse, having been socially ostracized by the other residents of Kunashir.
