= Smirnov (volcano) =

Volcano in the Kurile islands within the country of Russia

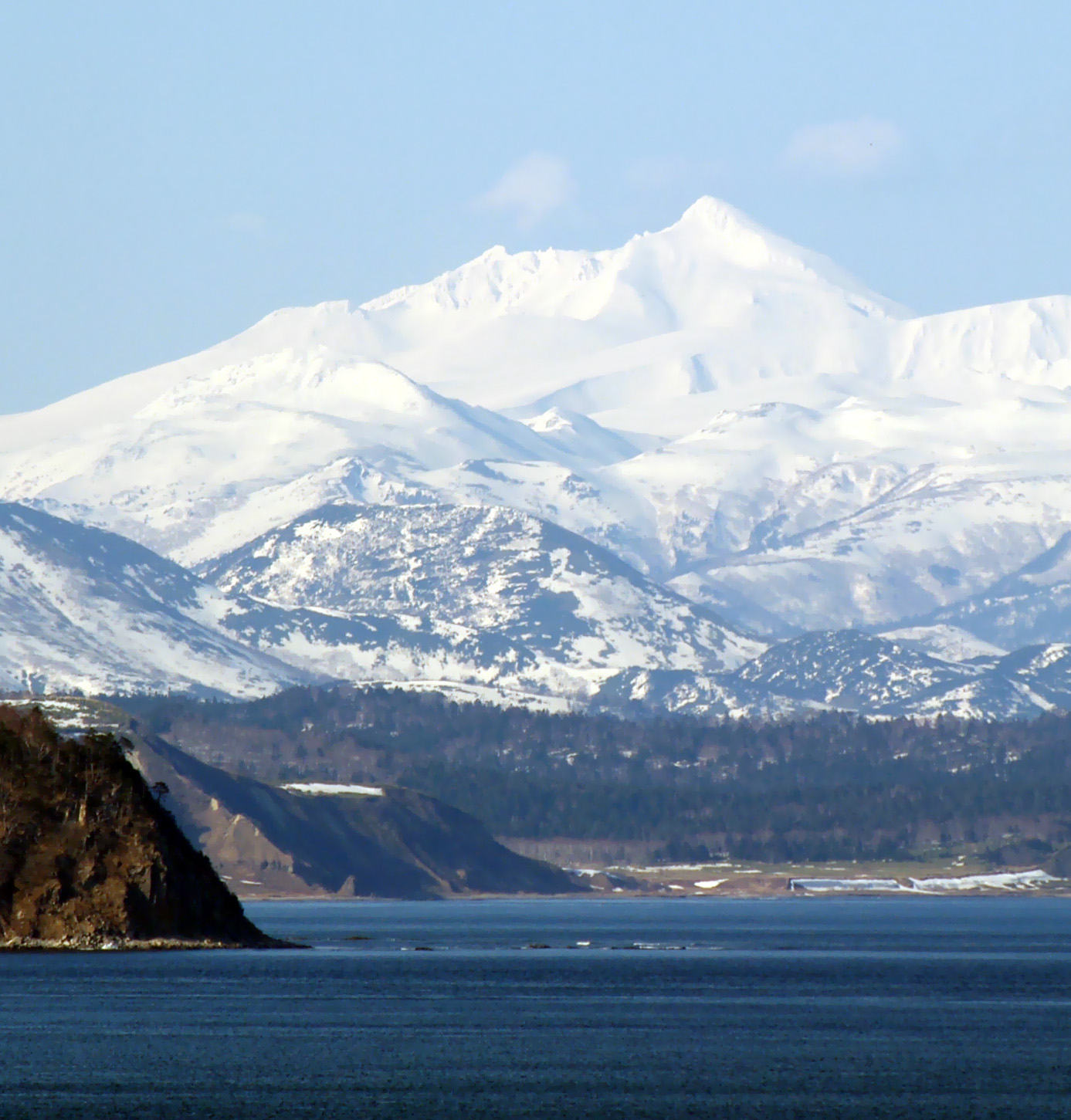
- The volcano as viewed from Yuzhno-Kurilsk

Highest point
- Elevation: 1,189 m (3,901 ft)
- Coordinates: 44.420°N 146.135°E

Geography
- Location within Far Eastern Federal District
- Location: Kunashir, Kuril Islands, Russia

Geology
- Mountain type: Stratovolcanoes
- Last eruption: Unknown

Smirnov (Russian: Вулкан Смирнова) is a volcano located at the northwestern end of Kunashir Island, Kuril Islands, Russia. It consists of two summits: Smirnov and Rurui (Russian: Руруй; Japanese: ルルイ岳, Rurui-dake) stratovolcanoes. Rurui is the higher summit.

== See also ==
- List of volcanoes in Russia
