= Tyatya =

Volcano in northeast Kunashir, Kuril Islands

- Chachadake
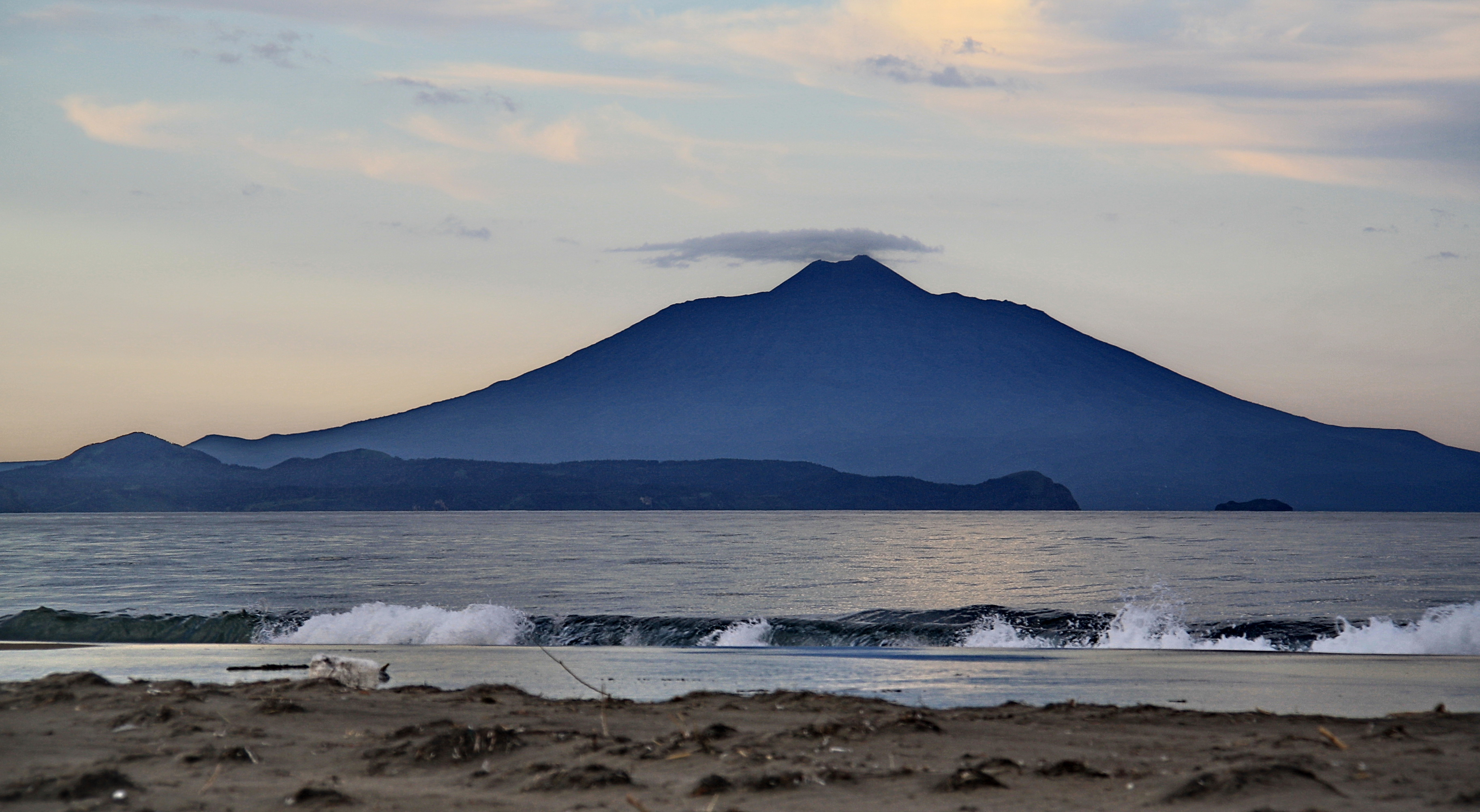
- Tyatya in 2010, viewed from the south-west

Highest point
- Elevation: 1,822 m (5,978 ft)
- Prominence: 1,822 m (5,978 ft)
- Listing: Ultra
- Coordinates: 44°21′3″N 146°15′23″E

Geography
- Location within Sakhalin Oblast
- Location: Kunashir, Kuril Islands, Russia

Geology
- Mountain type: Stratovolcano / somma volcano
- Last eruption: June 1981

Tyatya (Russian: Тятя, also spelled Tiatia and known as Chachadake (爺爺岳) in Japanese) is an active volcano located in the northeastern part of Kunashir Island, Kuril Islands, Russia. It is the highest peak on the island with an elevation of 1,819 metres (5,968 ft). Tyatya is one of the finest examples anywhere in the world of a somma volcano, a stratovolcano whose summit has collapsed to form a caldera which has then been mostly refilled by a new, younger volcanic cone which rises above the caldera rim.

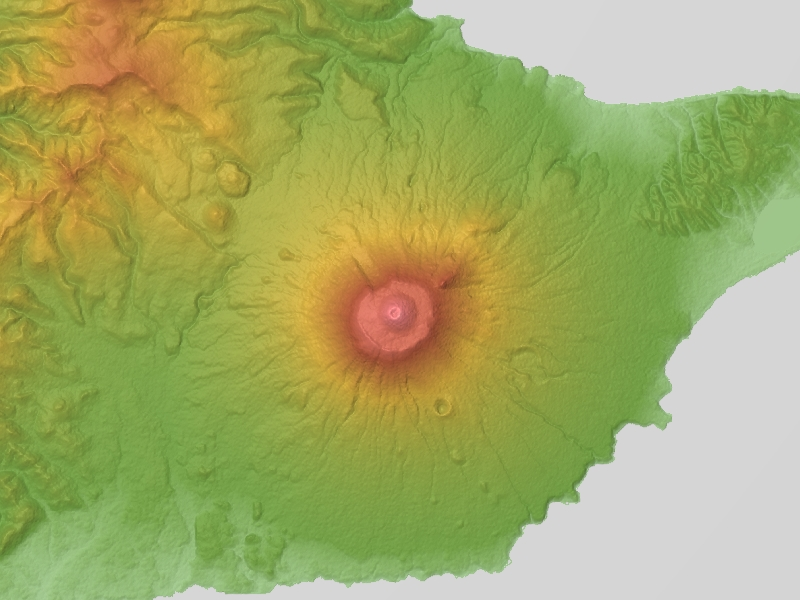
Relief Map

== See also ==
- List of volcanoes in Russia
- List of ultras of Northeast Asia
