= Pyotr Ivanovich Ricord =

Russian admiral (1776–1855)

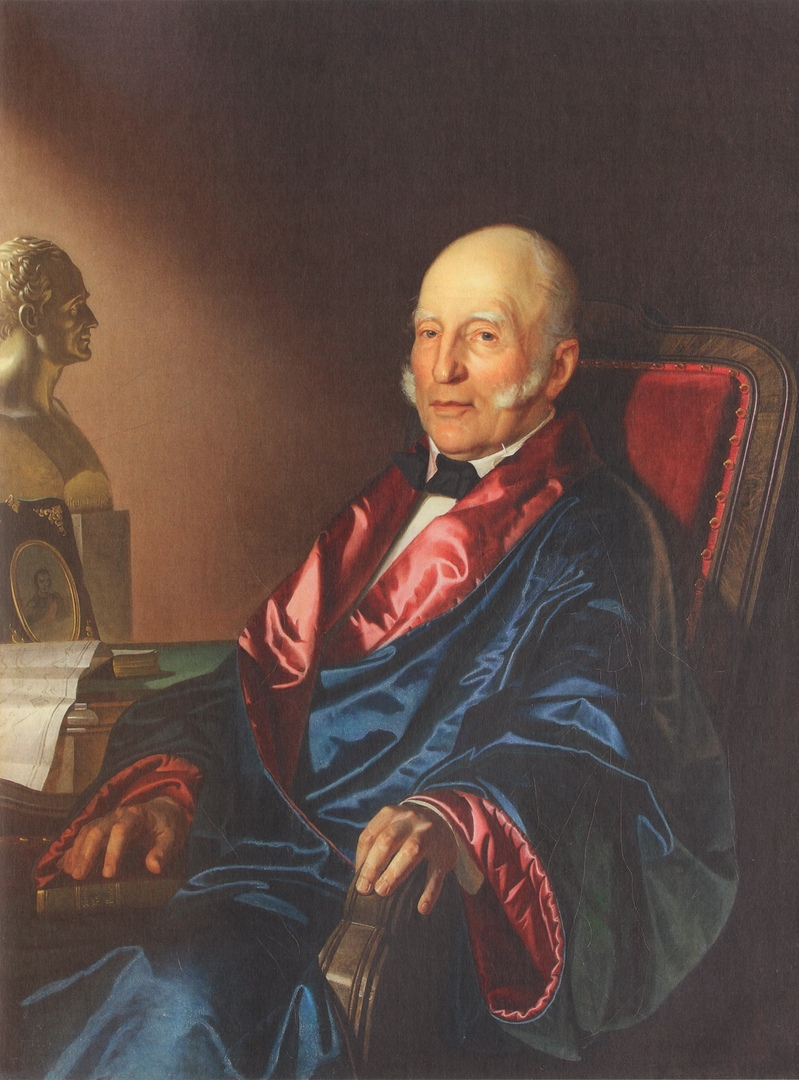
- Born: 9 February 1776; Toropets, Pskov Governorate, Russia
- Died: 28 February 1855 (aged 79) St. Petersburg, Russia
- Allegiance: Russia
- Branch: Imperial Russian Navy
- Rank: Admiral
- Awards: 2nd class of the Order of St. Anne; Order of St. Vladimir, 4th class Order of St. George, 4th class

Pyotr Ivanovich Ricord, also Petr Rikord (Russian: Пётр Иванович Рикорд; 9 February [O.S. 29 January] 1776 – 28 February [O.S. 16 February] 1855), was a Russian admiral, traveller, scientist, diplomat, writer, shipbuilder, statesman, and public figure.

== Military career ==
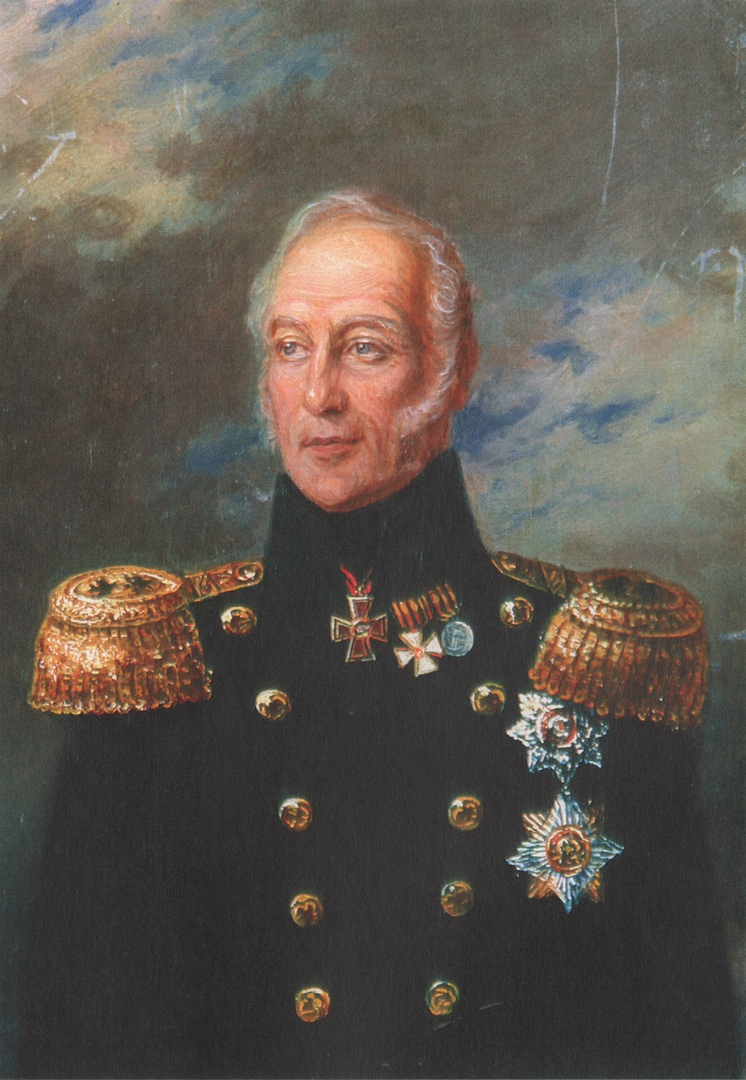
Portrait by an unknown artist

Pyotr Ricord was born in 1776 in the family of the prime major of Carabinier Ingermanland Regiment; he graduated from the Sea Cadet Corps; he began military service in the Baltic Fleet and got his first war decoration for the distinction in the landing operation on the coast of the Netherlands in 1799, it was the 4th class of the Order of St. Anne.

In 1803–1805, among the twelve best naval officers, he was sent as a volunteer to the British Fleet to improve Russian maritime practices. At that time he made sea trips to almost all British maritime dominions and took part in the war with France and Spain.

In 1807–1809, Ricord took part as a senior officer in Vasily Golovnin's world cruise on the ship Diana. He was awarded with the Order of St. Vladimir, 4th class "for the excellent performance of his office on the sloop "Diana" and for his help and assistance rendered to the captain of the sloop" and in particular "for the preservation of people's health."

In 1810–1811, he participated in the hydrographic exploration of the North Pacific, and he was awarded with the Order of St. George 4th class for 18 six-month maritime campaigns.

The captivity of Vasily Golovnin in 1811–1813 almost led to war between Russia and Japan in what became known as the Golovnin Incident. After the capture Ricord organized and led three expeditions to the release of Russian sailors from Japanese captivity, during which he showed his extraordinary diplomatic skills.

From 1817 to 1822, he was the head of Kamchatka and he was awarded with the 2nd class of the Order of St. Anne with diamond ornaments for the "humane care for the welfare of the residents." His plan of reforms on the Kamchatka Peninsula was accepted as a basis for long-term program of development of this region. An imperial decree ordered his successors as heads of the region to "stick to the rules worked out by fleet captain Ricord and to refrain from any changes."

He was the head of the Russian Navy squadrons blockading the Dardanelles during the Russo-Turkish War (1828–1829), participated in the Civil conflict in Greece (1831–1833), and defended Kronstadt (1854) during the Crimean War (1853–1856)

Ricord was one of the organizers and one of 17 founding members of the Imperial Russian Geographical Society (1845) in Saint Petersburg, Russia.

In 1850, he was appointed chairman of the Naval Scientific Committee.

== Legacy ==
A Rikord Island in Peter the Great Gulf was named after him.

== Sources ==
=== Primary sources ===
- "Narrative of my Captivity in Japan, during the years 1812 and 1813; with Observations on the Country and People." By Captain Golownin, R.N.; to which is added "'An Account of the Voyages to the Coasts of Japan, and of the Negotiations with the Japanese for the release of the Author and his Companions." By Captain Rikord. London: 1818.

=== Secondary sources ===
- "Рикорд, Петр Иванович" . Brockhaus and Efron Encyclopedic Dictionary (in Russian). 1906.
