= Kunashir =

Southernmost island of the Kuril Island chain

Disputed island Native name: Кунаши́р (Russian); 国後島 (Japanese); キナシㇼ (Ainu)
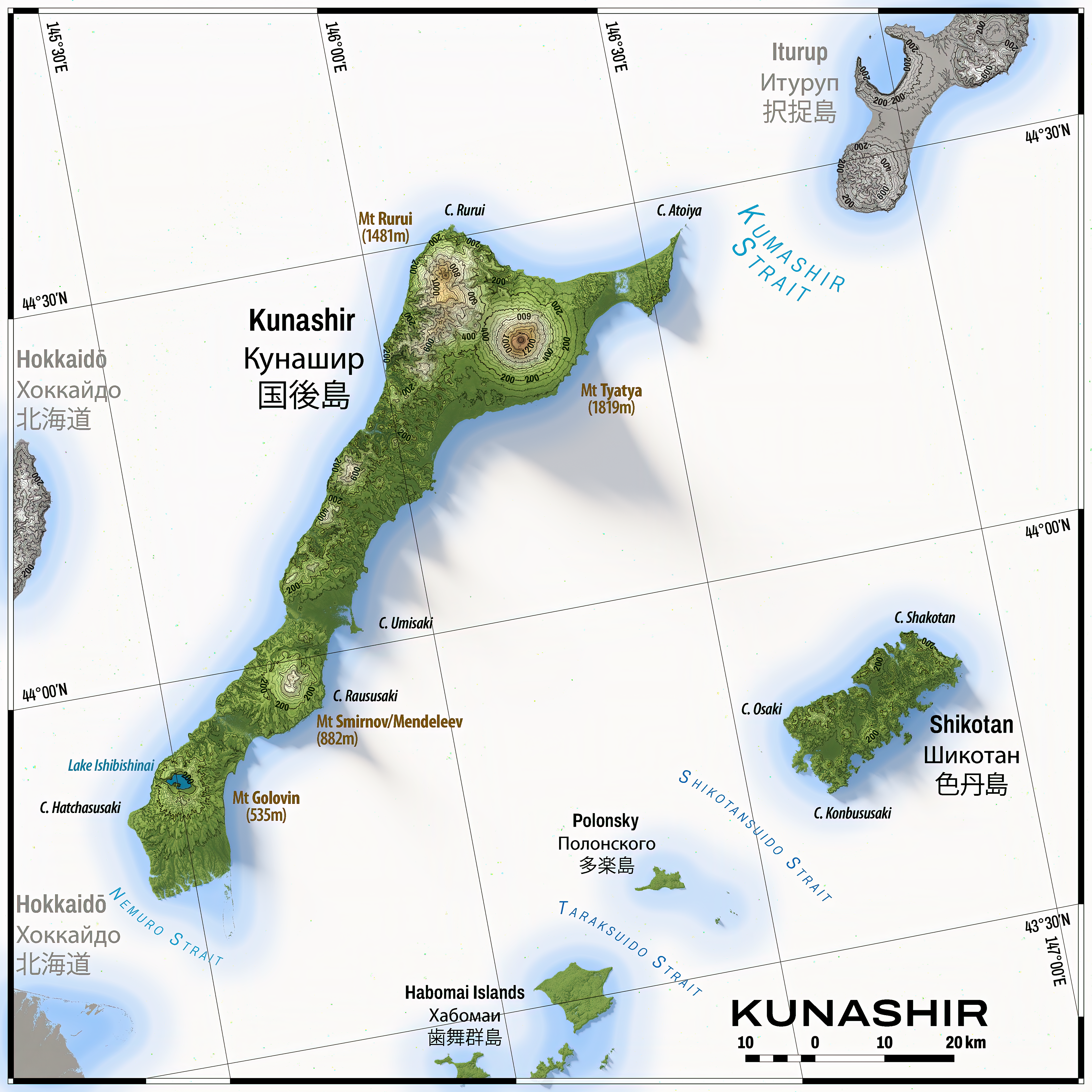
- Map of Kunashir and the adjacent islands

- Location of Kunashir Island

- Location within Russia Location within Japan
- Interactive map of Kunashir
- Other name: Kunashiri

Geography
- Location: Sea of Okhotsk
- Coordinates: 44°07′N 145°51′E
- Archipelago: Kuril Islands
- Area: 1,490 km^{2} (580 sq mi)
- Length: 123 km (76.4 mi)
- Width: 4 km (2.5 mi) to 30 km (19 mi)
- Highest elevation: 1,819 m (5968 ft)
- Highest point: Chacha

Administration
- Russia
- Federal subject: Sakhalin Oblast
- District: Yuzhno-Kurilsky

Claimed by
- Japan
- Prefecture: Hokkaido
- Subprefecture: Nemuro

Demographics
- Population: 7,683 (2021)

Kunashir (Russian: Кунаши́р, romanized: Kunashír), known in Japan as Kunashiri (Japanese: 国後島, Hepburn: Kunashiri-tō), is the southernmost island of the Kuril Islands. The island has been under Russian administration since the end of World War II, when Soviet forces took possession of the Kurils. It is claimed by Japan as part of its "Northern Territories". The 2021 Russian census recorded a population of 7,683 people.

== Etymology ==
According to the Hokkaido Government, the Japanese name Kunashiri (国後島, Kunashiri-tō) comes from the Ainu kina-sir (キナシㇼ), which translates to "grass island".

== Geography ==
Kunashir is separated by the Catherine Strait (Kunashiri Suido) from the island of Iturup, which is located 22 km northeast; Kunashir Strait (upper Nemuro Kaikyo) separates Kunashir from Shiretoko Peninsula (Hokkaido Island), located 25 km to the west; Izmena Strait (Notsuke Suido or lower Nemuro Kaikyo) separates Kunashir from Notsuke Peninsula (Hokkaido Island), located 16 km to the southwest; and the South Kuril Strait (Yuzhno-Kurilski Proliv, Minami Chishima Kaikyo) separates Kunashir from Shikotan and the Habomai Islands, 50 km to the east. Kunashir is visible from the nearby Japanese island of Hokkaido, from which it is separated by the Nemuro Strait.

- Area: 1,490 km^{2} (580 sq mi)
- Length: 123 km (76 mi)
- Width: 4–30 km (2.5–18.6 mi)

Kunashir is formed by four volcanoes which were separate islands but have since become joined together by low-lying areas with lakes and hot springs. All four volcanoes are still active: Tyatya (1,819 m (5,968 ft)), Smirnov, Mendeleyeva (Rausu-yama), and Golovnin (Tomari-yama). The island is made up of volcanic and crystalline rocks.

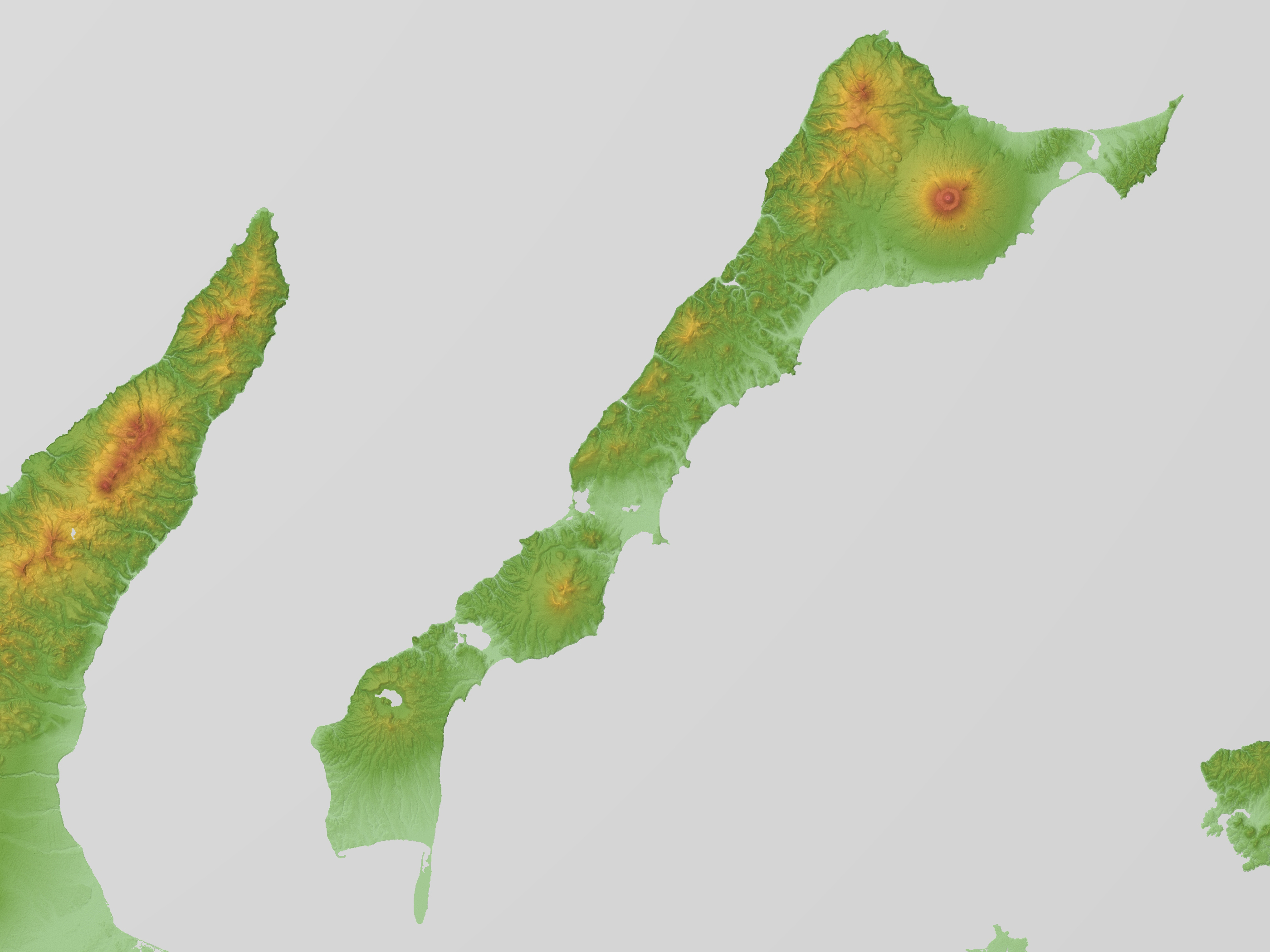
Relief map

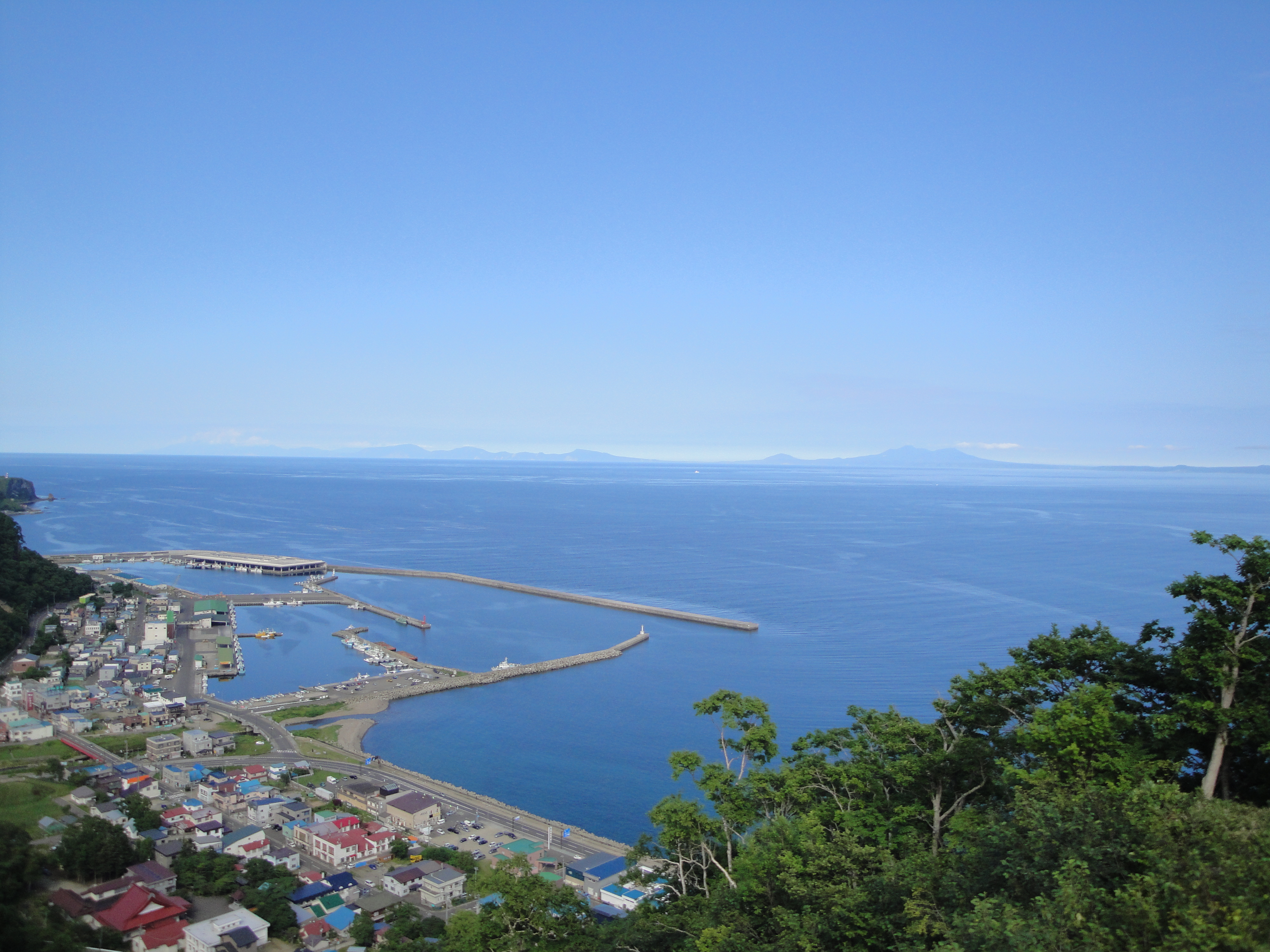
View of Kunashir from the Rausu Kunashiri Observatory Deck

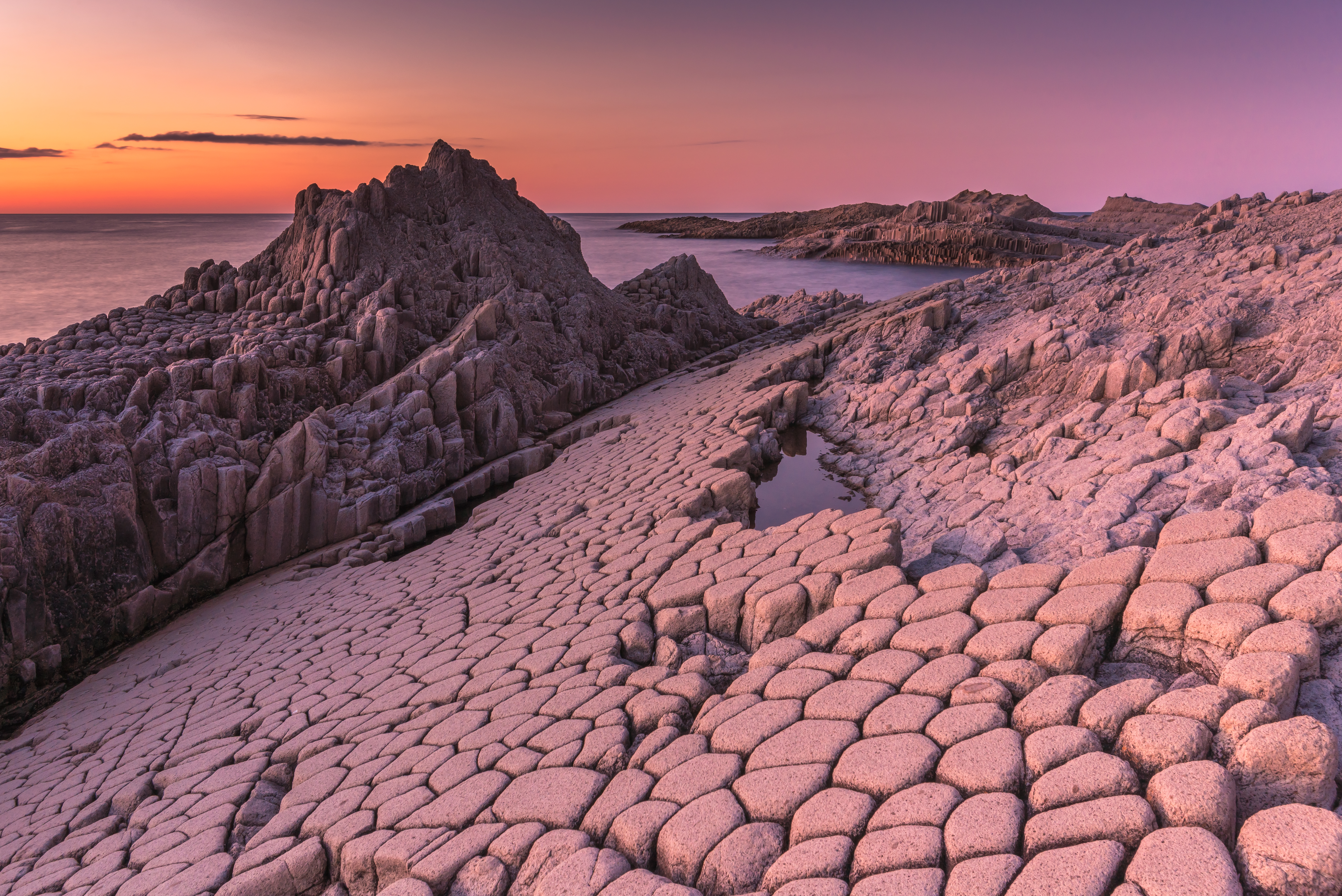
Cape Stolbchaty on the western side of the island

== Geology ==
Kunashir, the southernmost island of the Kuril Arc, is 123 km long (NE to SW), 7 to 30 km wide and has an area of 1,490 km². The island has several volcanic features, including active ones such as Tyatya (1,819 m), Ruruy (1,485 m), Mendeleev (886 m) and Golovnin (541 m). The terrain of Kunashir is rugged and mountainous, with young geomorphology, steep slopes and numerous waterfalls. Asymmetry in relief is notable, with the western (Okhotsk) shore being steep and elevated, in contrast to the eastern (Pacific) shore, which has a more level and flat topography.

In contrast to the Japan Arc, the absolute timing of the evolution of the primary Kuril Arc system has received comparatively little attention, particularly with respect to modern geochronological techniques. A recent study aimed to fill this gap by presenting the initial zircon U/Pb ages of the volcanic basement and thermochronological ages for the rocks of Kunashir, thus establishing a definitive temporal framework for their emplacement and subsequent exhumation. The volcanic rocks of the Kuril Islands generally exhibited a two-level structural classification: (1) a lower level consisting mainly of moderately deformed Neogene rocks, and (2) an upper level comprising Pleistocene to recent volcanics. These rocks exhibited a wide range of compositions from basalt to rhyolite, with a predominance of (basaltic) andesites.

The geology of Kunashir could be elucidated from this perspective by delineating two structural levels. The lower level, termed the Lower Complex, was characterised by yellowish to yellow-grey tuffs, tuffaceous sandstones and breccias, mainly of felsic to medium composition. Numerous subvolcanic stocks and plugs of andesite, dacite and rhyolite intruded these formations, with deeper intrusive rocks of granodiorite porphyry composition and texture. The upper level, termed the Upper Complex, was characterised by basaltic and basaltic andesite flows, small sub-volcanic intrusive bodies and modern andesitic stratovolcanoes.

Previous studies suggested a late Miocene to Pliocene age for the Lower Complex, and accordingly older rocks were either absent or not clearly identified on the island. The Lower Complex has been further subdivided into the Rybakov and Kamuy formations, although Martynov et al. used a different classification and terminology (see below). The Rybakov Formation, located in the most uplifted and deeply exhumed blocks, especially in the northern part of the island, was mainly an andesitic volcanic complex. This formation correlates with what Martynov et al. termed the Miocene Greentuff Formation. The Kamuy Formation, which forms the backbone of the island, consisted mainly of flysch-like volcanic-sedimentary deposits rich in felsic pumice of (rhyo)dacitic composition, with a thickness exceeding 1100 m. The Upper Complex, represented by the Fregat Formation, overlies the Rybakov and Kamuy Formations (Lower Complex). A distinct structural and erosional unconformity separated these complexes. The Fregat Formation comprised subaerial (basaltic) andesitic lava flows interbedded with tuffs, hyaloclastites and basaltic breccias. This suggests that the Fregat volcanic rocks are predominantly of sub-aerial origin, occasionally deposited at shallow depths below sea level. The Fregat volcanic deposits formed a distinctive volcanic plateau, formed near sea level and affected by subsequent tectonic movements, resulting in the fragmented table-top mountainous topography of Kunashir. The age of the Fregat Formation was determined to be late Pliocene to early Pleistocene based on diatoms (Neodenticula kamtschatica – N. Koizumii) and palynology (Dunichev, 1969), in agreement with K-Ar data from the Fregat basalts.

On Kunashir, the Late Miocene-Early Pliocene Rybakov Formation was exclusively formed under subaqueous conditions. The volcanic rocks of the middle Pliocene Kamuy Formation, assigned to subaerial conditions in the northern and central parts of Kunashir, indicate a subaqueous environment in the southern part. Intensive uplift, beginning in the second half of the Pliocene, led to significant tectonic movements between the accumulation of the Kamuy and Fregat formations in the late Pliocene. This resulted in a pronounced unconformity between the two, with the Fregat lava plateau experiencing differential vertical movement. The northern part of Kunashir showed substantial uplift of over 1 km, in contrast to the more modest elevation change of 200–300 m in the southern region. Sergeev reported a mid to late Miocene deformation event at Kunashir, associated with folding of the Kunashir 'basement' and emplacement of Miocene intrusions, accompanied by at least 1.5 km of uplift and denudation.

Four modern and active (Pleistocene to Holocene) stratovolcanoes have shaped the modern landscape of Kunashir. These volcanoes, characterised by a typical alternation of lava flows and tuff deposits, exhibited mainly basaltic-andesitic to andesitic compositions, with minor amounts of more differentiated magmas of dacitic affinity. This modern magmatic activity was closely linked to the subduction of the Pacific Plate beneath the Okhotsk Plate. Among these, Tyatya Volcano stands out as one of the most active and best studied volcanoes in the Kuril Arc.

Both the Lower and Upper Complexes were characterized by numerous sub-volcanic intrusions, with the Lower Complex also containing deeper intrusions. In the Rybakov Formation these intrusions manifested as stocks, dikes and sills of basaltic, andesitic and dacitic composition. The Kamuy Formation contained mainly dacite stocks, dikes and sills. Deeper-seated igneous rocks without volcanic analogs were represented by two distinct intrusive complexes: (1) the Prasolov Complex, which included gabbro, diorite, quartz diorite, granodiorite, and tonalite or plagiogranite, and (2) the Dokuchaev Complex, which included three small bodies of fine-grained porphyritic granodiorite and tonalite. The Prasolov plagiogranite (tonalite) – diorite complex consisted of three distinct plutons: the Prasolov, Mechnikov and Lobanov massifs. The Prasolov Massif, the largest with an area of 18 km², located in NE Kunashir, acted as a stock. Intrusive contacts with the rocks of the Rybakov Formation were mainly tectonic, with rare intrusive contacts showing contact aureoles characterised by quartz-biotite hornfels. The Prasolov Complex was inferred to be of relatively late Miocene to Pliocene age based on intrusive contacts, the presence of pebbles from Prasolov Complex granitoids in the Kamuy Formation sediments, and K-Ar ages ranging from 61 ± 12 to about 10 Ma (most common ages found between 11e10 Ma).

The Dokuchaev Granitoid Complex, younger than the Prasolov Complex, comprised three small stocks that cut across the Kamuy Formation. Intrusive contacts were observed and Kamuy xenoliths were present (Vergunov and Vlasov, cit. opt.). The Dokuchaev Complex, consisting of tonalite-porphyry, granodiorite-porphyry and diorite-porphyry, is an amalgamation of the Dokuchaev, Valentina and Orlov massifs. The Valentina Massif, a tonalite-porphyry stock along the Okhotsk coast in the northern part of Kunashir, showed tectonic rather than intrusive contacts. A Pliocene age for Dokuchaev has been proposed on the basis of geological and K-Ar data, with rocks from the Dokuchaev complex having reported K-Ar ages of 6.5e4.2 Ma, corresponding to late Miocene to early Pliocene age.

=== Environment ===
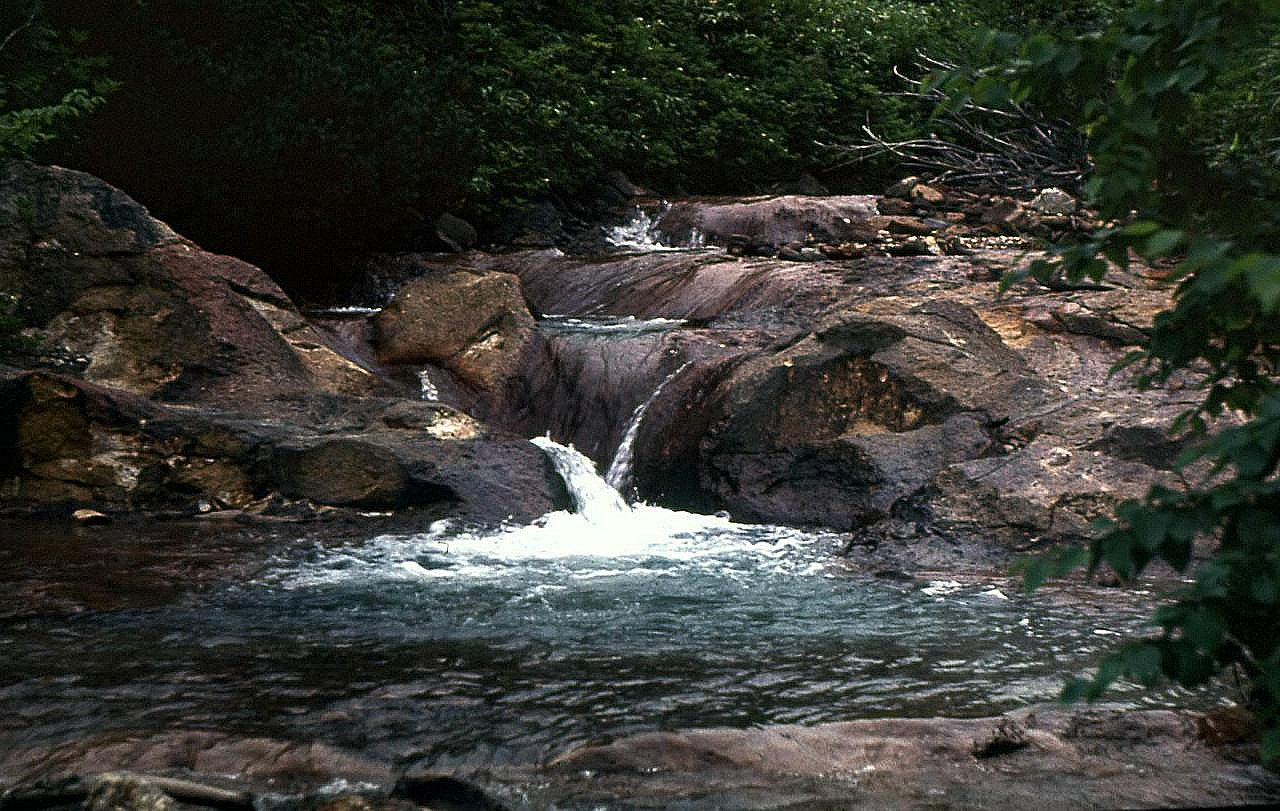
Sulfuric River, Kunashir

The climate is humid continental with very heavy precipitation especially in the autumn and a strong seasonal lag with maximum temperatures in August and September. The vegetation mostly consists of spruce, pine, fir, and mixed deciduous forests with lianas and Kuril bamboo underbrush. The mountains are covered with birch and Siberian Dwarf Pine scrub, herbaceous flowers or bare rocks. Tree cores of century-old oaks (Quercus crispula) were found in July 2001 on Kunashiri Island.

=== Important Bird Area ===
Kunashir, along with the neighbouring Lesser Kuril Chain of smaller islands, has been recognised as an Important Bird Area (IBA) by BirdLife International as the island supports populations of various threatened bird species, including many waterbirds, seabirds and waders.

== History ==
The original inhabitants of the island—as with most of Hokkaido and the Kurils—were the Ainu. Europeans are first recorded visiting this part of the Kurils in 1643 when the Castricum under Dutch cartographer Maarten Gerritsz Vries was exploring Hokkaido and the surrounding area for the Dutch East India Company (VOC). Vries's account of the area was incredibly garbled—including a fictitious continental extension dubbed Company Land—but while his imaginary Staten Island is usually connected to Iturup, its placement on most maps of the period more closely resembles the location of Kunashir. Vitus Bering's lieutenant Martin Spanberg mapped the actual locations of the Kurils including Kunashir in a series of voyages in 1738, 1739, and 1742 but Company Land and Staten Island continued to appear in European maps decades afterwards.

The Japanese expanded north to Kunashir in the 18th century, with the Matsumae clan establishing a fishery and trading site called Kunashiri-basho (国後場所) in 1754. Its headquarters was located in Tomari (present-day Golovnino) and administered Kunashir, Iturup, and Urup.

In 1789 Kunashir was one of the settings of the Menashi-Kunashiri Battle in which native Ainu revolted against Yamato Japanese tradespeople and colonists.

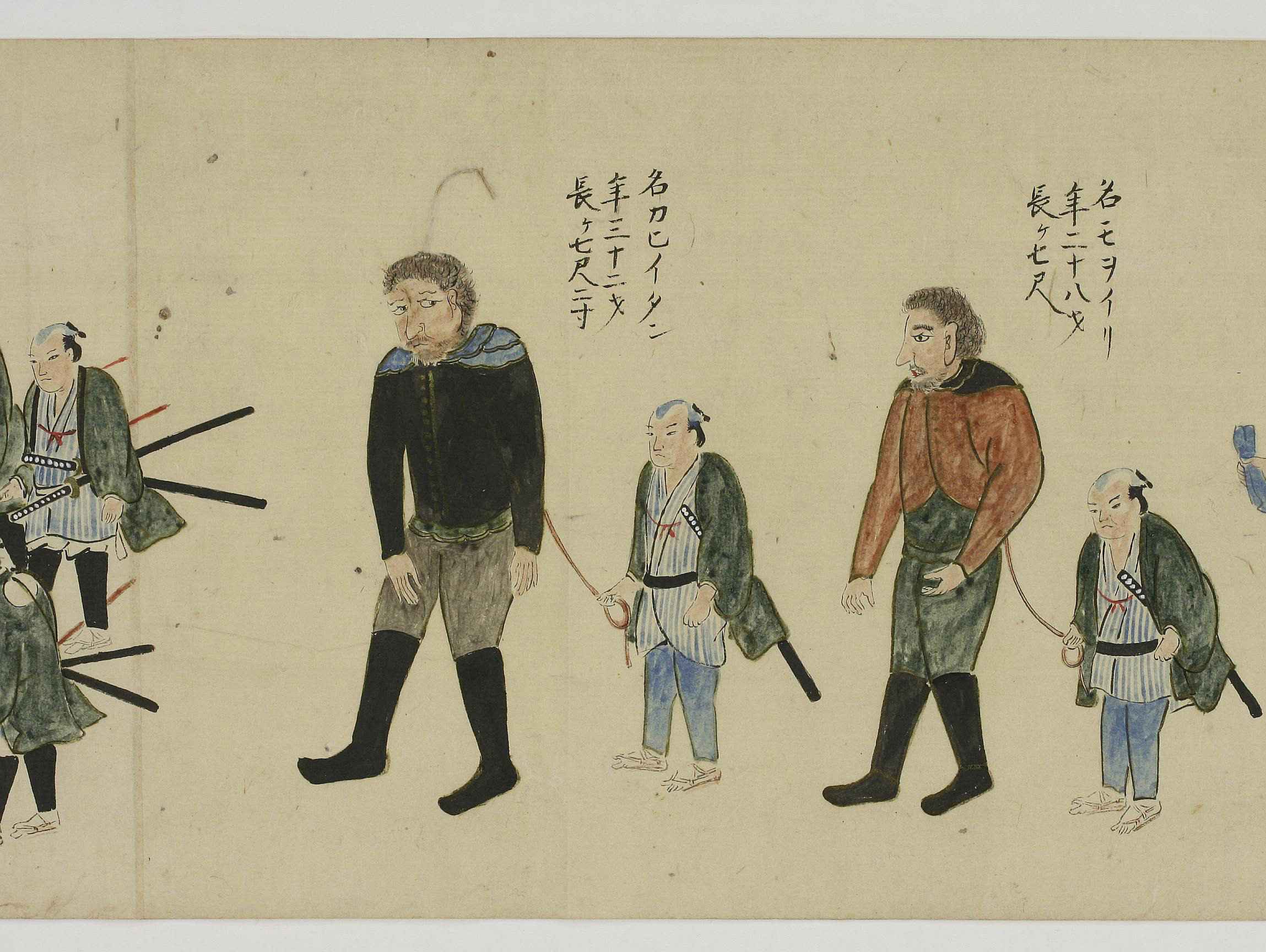
Vasily Golovnin (left person) taken prisoner

Russian navigator Vasily Golovnin attempted to map and explore the island in 1811, but was apprehended by Japanese authorities and spent two years in prison.

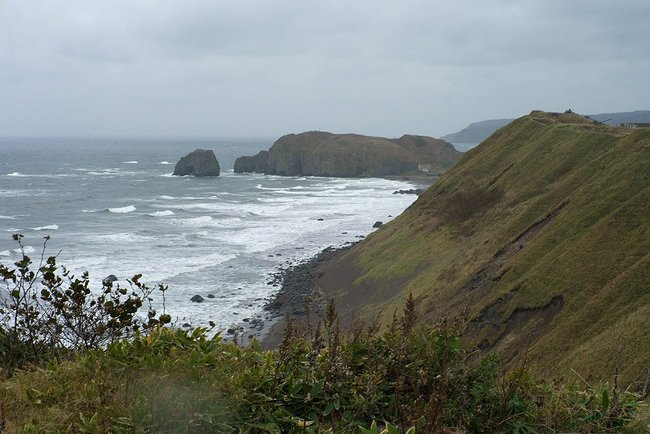
Kunashir coastline: photo taken by Russian president Dmitry Medvedev in November 2010

On 1 September 1945, in accordance with understandings reached at the Yalta Conference, the Soviet Union occupied the Kuril Islands. Although Japan agreed after deliberations to cede its claims to "the Kurile Islands" as part of the Treaty of San Francisco in 1951, the Japanese government has claimed since the mid-1950s that the southern islands were not part of the ceded Kuril Islands.

== Settlements ==
The largest settlement on Kunashir is Yuzhno-Kurilsk, administrative center of Yuzhno-Kurilsky District. Other settlements include the villages of Golovnino, Dubovoye, Goryachiy Plyazh, Lagunnoye (Lagunnoe), Mendeleyevo (Mendeleevo), and Otrada.

== Economy ==
The primary economic activity is fishing. The island has a port next to Yuzhno-Kurilsk. Kunashir enjoys a Mendeleevskaya GeoPP geothermal power plant with the capacity of 1.8 MW.

== Transport ==
The island is served by Mendeleyevo Airport.

== Population ==
After the 1994 earthquake, about one-third of Kunashir's population left and did not return. By 2002, the island's population was approximately 7,800. The total population of the disputed Kuril islands at that time was approximately 17,000.

== See also ==
- Zemlyak, Russian political group based in Kunashir that advocated the return of the Kuril Islands to Japan
