= Vasily Golovnin =

Russian explorer (1776–1831)

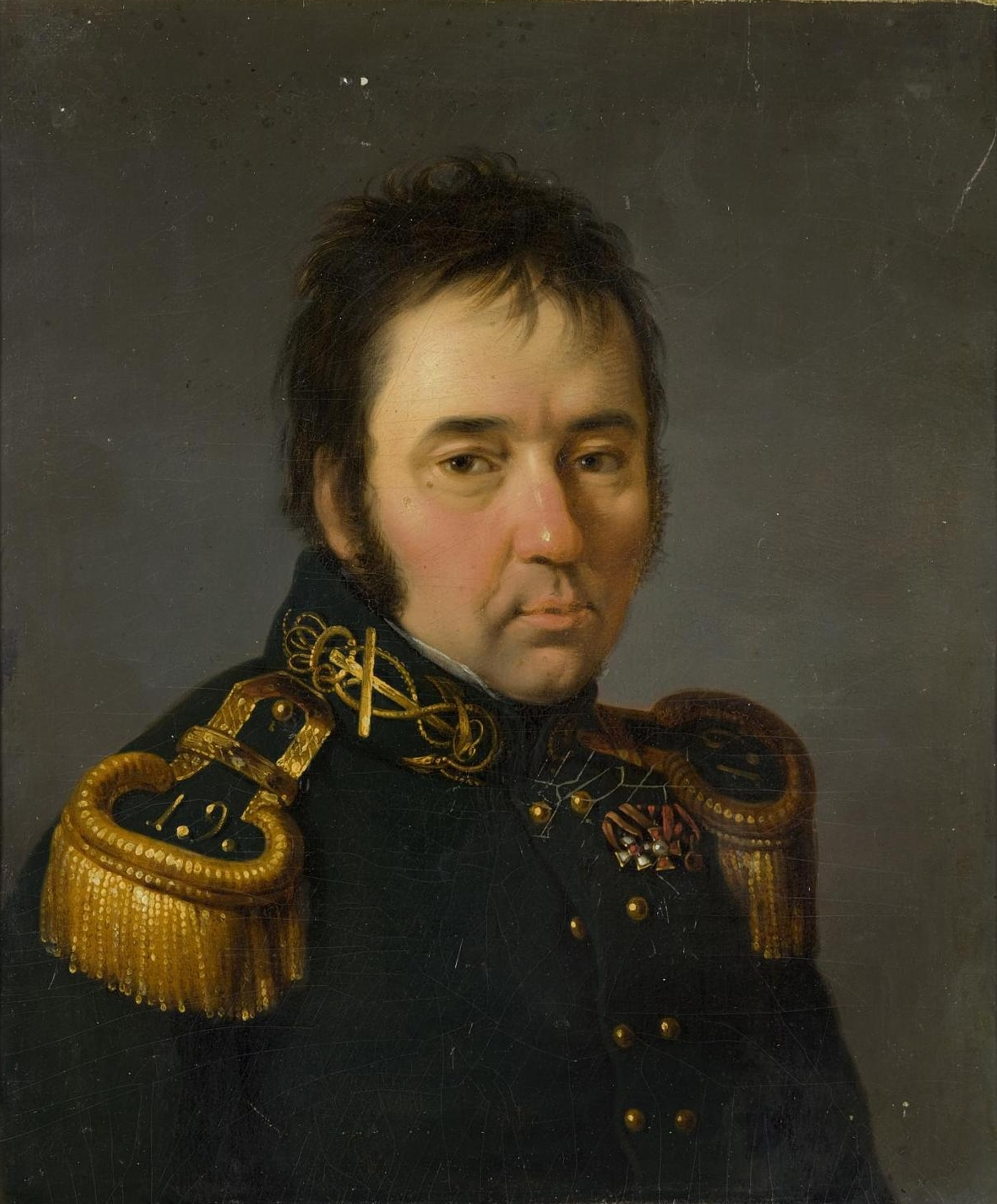
Vasily Mikhailovich Golovnin; portrait by Orest Kiprensky (c.1816)

Vasily Mikhailovich Golovnin (Russian: Василий Михайлович Головнин; 19 April [O.S. 8 April] 1776, Gulyniki, Ryazan Oblast – 11 July [O.S. 29 June] 1831, Saint Petersburg) was a Russian navigator, vice admiral, and corresponding member of the Russian Academy of Sciences (1818).

== Early life and career ==
Vasily Mikhailovich Golovnin was born in April 1776, in the village of Gulyniki in Ryazan Oblast, on his father's country estate. Both his father and grandfather had served in the Russian military as officers in the elite Preobrazhensky Lifeguard regiment. Golovnin appeared set to continue the family tradition, but his father died while he was still a child, and at the age of twelve he was enrolled in the Russian Naval College as a cadet. He graduated four years later in 1792.

Golovnin entered active service as a midshipman in May and June 1790, participating in several naval battles against the Swedes. He served in several foreign campaigns between 1793 and 1798. From 1798 to 1800 he served as adjutant and interpreter to Vice Admiral M. K. Makarov, commander of a Russian squadron operating jointly with the British fleet in the North Sea.

On the orders of Tsar Alexander I, Golovnin was sent, along with several other Russian officers, to obtain further training aboard British ships. He served three years (1802–1805) with the British fleet under Admirals Nelson, Collingwood, and Cornwallis. During this period, war was once again declared between the British and French, and Golovnin saw action while serving under Admiral Nelson. He returned to Russia in 1806, and began compiling a code of naval signals on the English pattern, which remained in use by the Russian fleet for more than twenty years.

== Diana's voyage ==
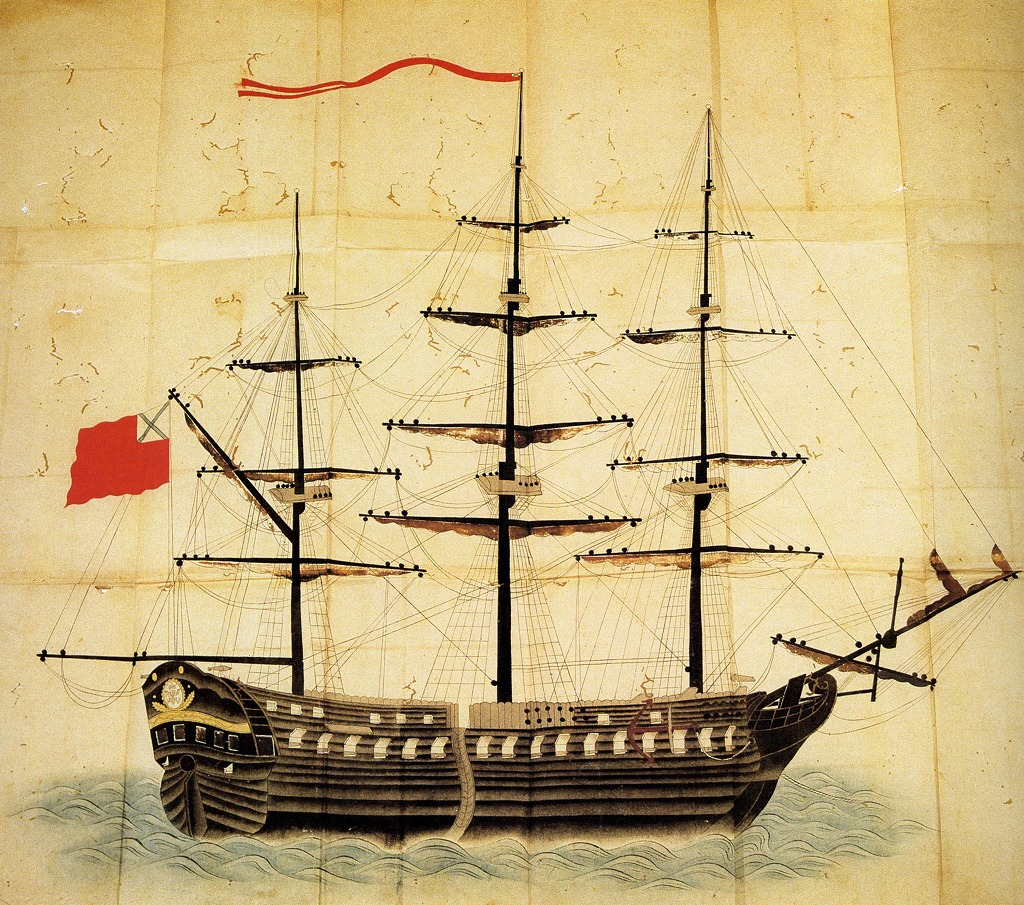
Japanese illustration of the sloop Diana

Golovnin was given command of the sloop Diana in 1806, and made his first voyage around the world (1807—1809), with the object of conducting a survey of the northern Pacific, and transporting supplies to Okhotsk.

Diana set sail from Kronstadt on 7 July 1807. A severe storm in April 1808 prevented Diana from sailing around Cape Horn, and Golovnin decided to set sail for the Cape of Good Hope in South Africa, to restock the ship's supplies. He anchored in the nearby port of Simon's Town on 3 May 1808. Golovnin, having been at sea for ten months, was unaware that Russian relations with Britain had deteriorated, and Russia had allied herself with the French. Diana was immediately detained as an enemy vessel by a British naval squadron, pending receipt of appropriate instructions from London. Golovnin and his crew spent more than a year detained aboard Diana at Simon's Town awaiting a decision from British authorities. When it became increasingly clear that a decision might never come, Golovnin began to plot their escape. On 28 May 1809, perfect conditions presented themselves - a fair wind and poor visibility. The crew severed the anchor cables, and managed successfully to sail out of the bay, passing directly in front of several British warships. Once the British discovered that they had escaped, they set off in pursuit, but failed to overtake Diana, which sailed safely to Kamchatka in 1810, and news of Diana's "audacious escape" quickly spread throughout the world. Golovnin left Kamchatka in 1810, sailing to Baranof Island, a recently settled outpost of the Russian-American Company.

In 1819, he published an account of their voyage, detention and escape, titled Journey of the Russian Emperor’s sloop Diana from Kronstadt to Kamchatka.

== Captivity in Japan ==
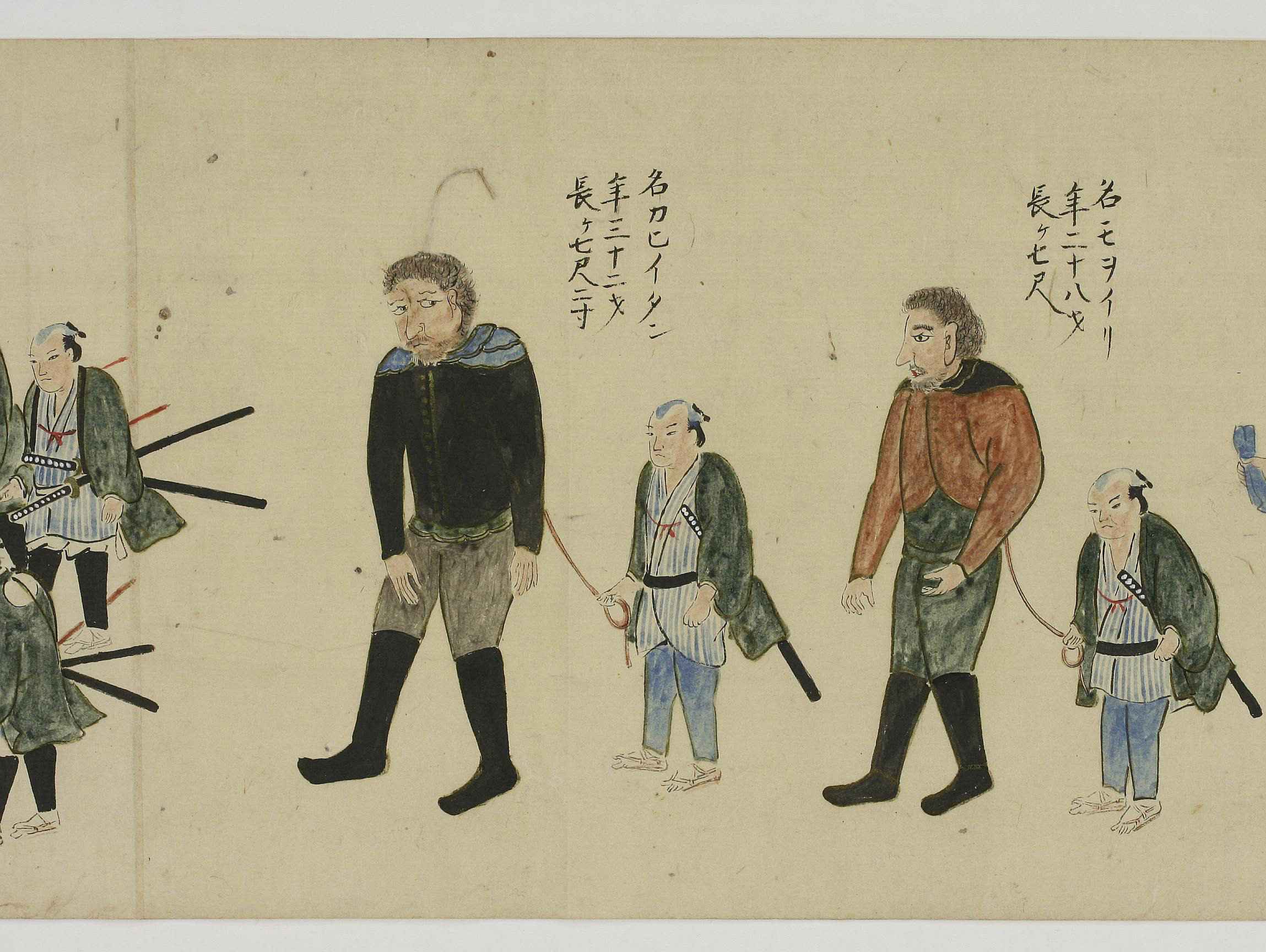
Vasily Golovnin taken prisoner

In 1811, Golovnin described and mapped the Kuril Islands from the Strait of Hope to the eastern shores of Iturup Island (Etorofu in Japanese). While exploring Kunashir Island (Kunashiri in Japanese), he was lured ashore, taken prisoner, charged with violating Sakoku (a Japanese policy prohibiting foreigners from entering Japan), and held captive for two years by the Japanese on the island of Hokkaido. Golovnin was said to possess a "superior education and fascination with foreign cultures." After making one failed attempt to escape his captors, Golovnin decided to utilize his time in detainment to master the Japanese language, and familiarize himself with Japanese culture and traditions.

Golovnin was released in 1813, returned to Russia, and published an account of his years in captivity. His book, Captivity in Japan During the Years 1811, 1812, 1813, became an instant classic. It was hailed in Russia as an authoritative volume on Japanese culture, and helped shape an entire generation's view of Japan. Golovnin clearly respected the Japanese, portraying them "as intelligent, as patriotic, and as worthy rivals" of the Russians in the Pacific. His representation of Japanese religious practices also became influential in Europe; he claimed that the Japanese practiced a form of Hinduism or Indian religion but a minority followed a distant, indigenous form of Christianity, influencing later scholars' claims about Japanese religion well into the 19th century. The captivity of Golovnin almost led to war between Russia and Japan in what became known as the Golovnin Incident.

== Around the world on the Kamchatka ==
On 7 September 1817, Golovnin set out on a second voyage around the world aboard the frigate Kamchatka. Serving under him were three future Russian explorers of prominence - Fyodor Litke, Fyodor Matyushkin, and Ferdinand von Wrangel. After sailing around Cape Horn, the objective was to deliver supplies to Kamchatka, and survey previously unexplored islands along what is now the northwestern coast of Alaska. Golovnin was also tasked with compiling a report detailing relations between the Kodiak Islanders and employees of the Russian-American Company.

He arrived in Kamchatka the following May, then returned to Europe via the Cape of Good Hope, completing his circumnavigation by landing at St Petersburg on 17 September 1819. After the journey, Golovnin published Around the World on the Kamchatka, describing his voyage, and his encounters with the native Kodiak and Sandwich Islanders. Though the journey had "achieved little in the way of new discoveries," Golovnin returned with "a vast store of scientific and astronomical information" to share with Russian scientists.

In the book The Lost Pianos of Siberia by Sophy Roberts, it is mentioned that Golovnin was "busted" out of his Japanese captivity by Pyotr Rikord, the newly appointed chief of Kamchatka. As a "thank you" Golovnin rewarded Rikord's wife Lyudmila, a keen pianist, with a piano shipped all the way from St Petersburg, which took eight months and eight days to deliver.

== Later career and death ==
In 1821, Golovnin was appointed assistant director of the Russian Naval College, and later, in 1823, General Quartermaster of the Fleet. A talented administrator, Golovnin successfully managed the activities of the shipbuilding, commissariat, and artillery departments. Under his supervision, over two hundred ships were built, including the first Russian steamships. Golovnin also served as a mentor to numerous Russian navigators, including the aforementioned Fyodor Litke and Ferdinand von Wrangel.

Golovnin died of cholera during an epidemic that swept through the city of Saint Petersburg in 1831.

== Legacy and honors ==
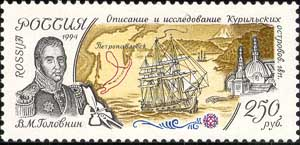
Golovnin in a Russian postage stamp

Golovnin was awarded many honors during his life, including the Order of St. Vladimir and the Order of Saint George, serving as commander of the latter. According to one historian, his literary works detailing his adventures at sea and on shore remain notable due to his "respect for historical detail...[his] critical ability, literary skill, and lively curiosity." A complete edition was published at St Petersburg in five volumes in 1864, with maps and charts, and a biography of the author.

The village of Golovin, Alaska, Cape Golovnin, as well as Golovnin Bay and Golovnin Lagoon, are all named in honor of Vasily Golovnin. A strait between two of the Kuril Islands, Golovnin volcano on Kunashir Island, capes on Novaya Zemlya and Franz Josef Land, are among other landmarks bearing his name. The cape of Point Hope in Alaska was also originally named in Golovnin's honor.

== Family ==
Golovnin married the daughter of a Tver landowner and retired army officer, Evdokiya Stepanovna Lutkovskaya (1795–1884). All four of Evdokiya's brothers served in the Russian Navy; two of them, Peter and Feopemt Lutkovsky, became Admirals, and rose to great prominence.

Admiral Feopemt Lutkovsky (1803–1852) served under Golovnin during his voyage aboard the Kamchatka (1817–1819). Feopemt was described as "free thinking", and according to testimony given by individuals involved in the Decembrist Uprising, he was in close communication with several members of their society. He avoided prosecution for treason due to the intervention of Fyodor Litke. Evdokiya's sister Ekaterina also married a naval officer, Rear Admiral Maksim Maksimovich Genning.

Golovnin's son, Alexander Vasilyevich Golovnin (1821–1886), initially followed in his father's footsteps, serving in the Russian Navy. A close friend and associate of Grand Duke Konstantin Nikolayevich, Alexander retired from the Navy, and served as Minister of Education (1861–1866) under Tsar Alexander II. In addition to his work as a naval officer and bureaucrat, Alexander served as director of the journal Morskoi Sbornik, and was actively involved in the Zemstvo. It was Alexander who preserved, collected, and eventually published his father's works under the title Works and Translations (Sochineniia i Perevody).

== Fiction ==
- Vasily Golovnin makes an appearance in Patrick O'Brian's novel The Mauritius Command (1977).

== See also ==
- Sakoku
- List of Westerners who visited Japan before 1868

== Sources ==
- How Sloop Diana, commanded by Lieutenant Vasilii M. Golovnin, eluded the British fleet at Simon's Bay
- USGS - Alaska
