= List of mountains and hills of Russia =

This is a list of mountains and hills of Russia.

== List by elevation ==
=== Over 5000 meters ===
| Peak | Russian name | Elevation | Prominence | Isolation | Coordinates | Range or Landform | Federal subject | Image | Notes |
|---|---|---|---|---|---|---|---|---|---|
| Elbrus (Note: Elbrus, Russia at Peakbagger.com "Mount Elbrus". Peakware.com. Archived from the original on 2016-03-04. "Elbrus". Global Volcanism Program. Smithsonian Institution. "Mount Elbrus (West Summit)". PeakVisor. "Mount Elbrus". peakery. "Mount Elbrus". Wikimapia.) | Эльбрус | 5642 m 18,510 ft | 4741 m 15,554 ft | 2,470 km 1,535 mi | 43°21′18″N 42°26′21″E | Bokovoy Range; Greater Caucasus | Kabardino-Balkaria; Karachay-Cherkessia | | Highest peak of Europe and Russia; Dormant stratovolcano |
| Dykh-Tau (Note: Gora Dykh-Tau, Russia at Peakbagger.com "Dykhtau". PeakVisor. "Dykh-Tau". Peakware.com. Archived from the original on 2016-03-04.) | Дыхтау | 5205 m 17,077 ft | 2002 m 6,568 ft | 63.4 km 39.4 mi | 43°03′09″N 43°07′54″E | Bokovoy Range; Greater Caucasus | Kabardino-Balkaria | | Second highest peak of Russia |
| Koshtan-Tau (Note: Gora Koshtan-Tau, Russia at Peakbagger.com "Koshtan-Tau". Peakware.com. Archived from the original on 2016-03-04.) | Коштантау | 5152 m 16,903 ft | 812 m 2,664 ft | 6.55 km 4.07 mi | 43°03′09″N 43°12′43″E | Bokovoy Range; Greater Caucasus | Kabardino-Balkaria | | Third highest peak of Russia |
| Pik Pushkina (Note: Pik Pushkin, Russia at Peakbagger.com) | Пик Пушкина | 5100 m 16,732 ft | 50 m 164 ft | 0.27 km 0.17 mi | 43°02′57″N 43°08′15″E | Bokovoy Range; Greater Caucasus | Kabardino-Balkaria | | Located in the mountain massif of Dykh-Tau |
| Jangi-Tau (Note: Jangi-Tau, Russia/Georgia at Peakbagger.com) | Джангитау | 5085 m 16,683 ft | 335 m 1,099 ft | 4.41 km 2.74 mi | 43°01′08″N 43°03′24″E | Main Caucasian Range; Greater Caucasus | Kabardino-Balkaria (Note: On the border between Georgia and Russia) | | |
| Shkhara (Note: Shkhara, Russia/Georgia at Peakbagger.com "Shkhara". PeakVisor. "Shkhara (5 201m)". Wikimapia.) | Шхара | 5193 m 17,037 ft | 1357 m 4,452 ft | 0.05 km 0.03 mi | 43°00′02″N 43°06′44″E | Main Caucasian Range; Greater Caucasus | Kabardino-Balkaria | | Highest point in Georgia |
| Kazbek (Note: Gora Kazbek, Russia/Georgia at Peakbagger.com "Kazbek". Peakware.com. Archived from the original on 2016-03-04. "Kazbek". Global Volcanism Program. Smithsonian Institution. "Mount Mkinvartsveri (Kazbegi)". PeakVisor.) | Казбек | 5034 m 16,516 ft | 2353 m 7,720 ft | 113.6 km 70.6 mi | 42°41′57″N 44°31′06″E | Khokh Range; Bokovoy Range; Greater Caucasus | North Ossetia–Alania | | Highest peak in North Ossetia–Alania; Second-highest volcanic summit in the Caucasus; Highest peak in the Khokh Range |
| Мижирги (Note: Mishrigi, Russia at Peakbagger.com) | Мижирги | 5019 m 16,467 ft | 219 m 719 ft | 1.03 km 0.64 mi | 43°02′39″N 43°08′57″E | Bezengi Wall; Greater Caucasus | Kabardino-Balkaria | | |

=== 4000 to 4999 meters ===
| Peak | Russian name | Elevation | Prominence | Isolation | Coordinates | Range or Landform | Federal subject | Image | Notes |
|---|---|---|---|---|---|---|---|---|---|
| Katyn-Tau (Note: Katyn-Tau, Russia/Georgia at Peakbagger.com) | Катын-Тау | 4979 m 16,335 ft | 159 m 522 ft | 1.65 km 1.03 mi | 43°01′47″N 43°02′11″E | Greater Caucasus | Kabardino-Balkaria | | |
| Kukurtlu (Note: Kukurtlu Dome, Russia at Peakbagger.com) | Кюкюртлю | 4978 m 16,332 ft | 18 m 59 ft | 1.15 km 0.71 mi | 43°20′34″N 42°24′23″E | Greater Caucasus | Karachay-Cherkessia | | |
| Pik Schota Rustaveli (Note: Pik Schota Rustaveli, Russia/Georgia at Peakbagger.com) | Пик Шота Руставели | 4960 m 16,273 ft | 40 m 131 ft | 0.47 km 0.29 mi | 43°01′33″N 43°02′37″E | Greater Caucasus | Kabardino-Balkaria | | Named after Georgian poet Shota Rustaveli |
| Gestola (Note: Gestola, Russia/Georgia at Peakbagger.com) | Гестола | 4860 m 15,945 ft | 320 m 1,050 ft | 2.09 km 1.3 mi | 43°02′54″N 43°01′28″E | Greater Caucasus | Kabardino-Balkaria | | |
| Jimara (Note: Jimari-Khokh, Russia/Georgia at Peakbagger.com) | Джимара | 4780 m 15,682 ft | 840 m 2,756 ft | 8.08 km 5.02 mi | 42°43′15″N 44°24′50″E | Greater Caucasus | North Ossetia–Alania | | Second highest peak of North Ossetia–Alania; Located on the Khokh Range |
| Klyuchevskoi (Note: Klyuchevskaya Sopka, Russia at Peakbagger.com "Kliuchevskoi". Peakware.com. Archived from the original on 2016-03-04. "Klyuchevskoy". Global Volcanism Program. Smithsonian Institution. "Klyuchevskaya Sopka". PeakVisor.) | Ключевская Сопка | 4750 m 15,584 ft | 4649 m 15,253 ft | 2,747 km 1,707 mi | 56°03′22″N 160°38′39″E | Eastern Ridge; Kamchatka Peninsula | Kamchatka Krai | | Highest Active volcano in Eurasia and Russia; Highest peak of Asian Russia |
| Uilpata (Note: Gora Uilpata, Russia at Peakbagger.com "Uillata". PeakVisor.) | Уилпата | 4649 m 15,253 ft | 1300 m 4,265 ft | 50.3 km 31.3 mi | 42°46′33″N 43°48′12″E | Greater Caucasus | North Ossetia–Alania | | |
| Kamen | Камень | 4619 m 15,154 ft | 1335 m 4,380 ft | 4.8 km 2.98 mi | 56°01′00″N 160°35′36″E | Eastern Ridge; Kamchatka Peninsula | Kamchatka Krai | | Second highest volcano of Kamchatka Peninsula |
| Tikhtengen (Note: Tikhtengen, Russia/Georgia at Peakbagger.com) | Тихтенген | 4618 m 15,151 ft | 768 m 2,520 ft | 8.14 km 5.06 mi | 43°7′7″N 42°59′22″E | Greater Caucasus | Kabardino-Balkaria | | |
| Ailama (Note: Ailama, Russia/Georgia at Peakbagger.com) | Айлама | 4546 m 14,915 ft | 696 m 2,283 ft | 5.88 km 3.65 mi | 42°57′30″N 43°10′40″E | Greater Caucasus | Kabardino-Balkaria | | |
| Jailik (Note: Jailik, Russia at Peakbagger.com) | Джайлык | 4533 m 14,872 ft | 926 m 3,038 ft | 15.79 km 9.81 mi | 43°14′26″N 42°53′7″E | Greater Caucasus | Kabardino-Balkaria | | |
| Gora Salynngantau (Note: Salinan, Russia at Peakbagger.com) | Гора Салыннгантау | 4508 m 14,790 ft | 621 m 2,037 ft | 4.46 km 2.77 mi | 43°05′21″N 43°03′21″E | Greater Caucasus | Kabardino-Balkaria | | |
| Belukha (Note: Gora Belukha, Russia/Kazakhstan at Peakbagger.com "Belukha". PeakVisor.) | Белуха | 4506 m 14,783 ft | 3343 m 10,968 ft | 668 km 415 mi | 49°48′27″N 86°35′24″E | Katun Range; Altai Mountains | Altai Republic (Note: On the border between Kazakhstan and Russia) | | Highest peak of the Altai Mountains |
| Tebulosmta (Note: Gora Tebulosmta, Russia/Georgia at Peakbagger.com "Tebulosmta". PeakVisor.) | Тебулосмта | 4493 m 14,741 ft | 2145 m 7,037 ft | 66.1 km 41.1 mi | 42°34′24″N 45°19′03″E | Greater Caucasus | Chechnya | | Highest mountain of Chechenya |
| Sugan (Note: Sugan-Tau, Russia at Peakbagger.com) | Суган | 4487 m 14,721 ft | 1161 m 3,809 ft | 18.61 km 11.56 mi | 42°58′27″N 43°26′37″E | Greater Caucasus | Kabardino-Balkaria; North Ossetia–Alania | | |
| Bazardüzü (Note: Bazar Dyuzi, Russia/Azerbaijan at Peakbagger.com "Gora Bazardyuzi". PeakVisor.) | Базардюзю | 4466 m 14,652 ft | 2454 m 8,051 ft | 259 km 161 mi | 41°13′28″N 47°51′30″E | Greater Caucasus | Dagestan (Note: On the border between Azerbaijan and Russia) | | Highest mountain of Azerbaijan and Dagestan |
| Donguzorun-Cheget-Karabashi (Note: Dongusorun, Russia/Georgia at Peakbagger.com) | Донгузорун-Чегет-Карабаши | 4454 m 14,613 ft | 1087 m 3,566 ft | 14.06 km 8.74 mi | 43°11′40″N 42°30′53″E | Greater Caucasus | Kabardino-Balkaria | | |
| Shan (Note: Shan, Russia/Georgia at Peakbagger.com "Gora Shan". PeakVisor.) | Шан | 4452 m 14,606 ft | 1776 m 5,827 ft | 19.14 km 11.89 mi | 42°40′33″N 44°45′27″E | Greater Caucasus | Ingushetia | | Highest mountain of Ingushetia |
| Tepli (Note: Tepli, Russia at Peakbagger.com) | Тепли | 4431 m 14,537 ft | 1144 m 3,753 ft | 22.3 km 13.83 mi | 42°44′02″N 44°07′47″E | Greater Caucasus | North Ossetia–Alania | | |
| Adaj-Hoh | Адай-Хох | 4408 m 14,462 ft | | | 42°44′50″N 43°52′10″E | Greater Caucasus | North Ossetia–Alania | | |
| Shkhelda (Note: Shkhelda, Russia/Georgia at Peakbagger.com) | Шхельда | 4388 m 14,396 ft | 438 m 1,437 ft | 2.68 km 1.67 mi | 43°08′59″N 42°38′40″E | Greater Caucasus | Kabardino-Balkaria | | |
| Lalver (Note: Lyalvar, Russia/Georgia at Peakbagger.com) | Ляльвер | 4355 m 14,288 ft | 155 m 509 ft | 1.67 km 1.04 mi | 43°04′14″N 43°00′57″E | Bezengi Wall; Greater Caucasus | Kabardino-Balkaria | | |
| Laboda | Лабода | 4313 m 14,150 ft | 968 m 3,176 ft | 7.9 km 4.91 mi | 42°53′24″N 43°28′40″E | Greater Caucasus | North Ossetia–Alania | | |
| Diklosmta (Note: Diklos-mta, Russia/Georgia at Peakbagger.com) | Диклосмта | 4285 m 14,058 ft | 1263 m 4,144 ft | 38.7 km 24.1 mi | 42°29′32″N 45°46′51″E | Greater Caucasus | Chechnya; Dagestan | | |
| Ullu-Tau (Note: Ullu-Tau, Russia/Georgia at Peakbagger.com) | Уллу-Тау | 4277 m 14,032 ft | 531 m 1,742 ft | 4.76 km 2.96 mi | 43°10′23″N 42°49′27″E | Caucasus Mountains | Kabardino-Balkaria | | |
| Maasheybash (Note: Severo-Chuyskiy Khrebet High Point, Russia at Peakbagger.com "Maashei-bashi". PeakVisor.) | Маашейбаш | 4177 m 13,704 ft | 1805 m 5,922 ft | 74.3 km 46.2 mi | 50°03′49″N 87°34′04″E | Northern Chuya Range; Altai Mountains | Altai Republic | | Highest peak of the Chuya Belki |
| Addala-Shukhgelmeer (Note: Gora Addala Shukgelmezr, Russia at Peakbagger.com "Gora Addala Shukgelmezr". PeakVisor.) | Аддала-Шухгельмеэр | 4152 m 13,622 ft | 1792 m 5,879 ft | 42.3 km 26.3 mi | 42°20′18″N 46°15′00″E | Greater Caucasus | Dagestan | | |
| Dyultydag (Note: Gora Dyultydag, Russia at Peakbagger.com "Gora Dyultydag". PeakVisor.) | Дюльтыдаг | 4127 m 13,540 ft | 1834 m 6,017 ft | 69.4 km 43.1 mi | 41°57′34″N 46°55′20″E | Greater Caucasus | Dagestan | | |
| Gokli (Note: Gora Gokli, Russia at Peakbagger.com "Gora Gokli". PeakVisor.) | Гокли | 4046 m 13,274 ft | | | 41°55′23″N 46°50′10″E | Greater Caucasus | Dagestan | | Highest peak of Rutulsky district |
| Dombay-Ulgen (Note: Dombai-Ulgen, Russia/Georgia at Peakbagger.com) | Домбай-Ульген | 4046 m 13,274 ft | 1237 m 4,058 ft | 54.1 km 33.6 mi | 43°14′37″N 41°43′38″E | Greater Caucasus | Karachay-Cherkessia (Note: On the border between Abkhazia, a partially recognized state that is widely considered territory of Georgia, and Russia) | | Highest peak of Abkhazia |
| Akturu | Актуру | 4045 m 13,271 ft | | | 50°05′38″N 87°40′43″E | North Chuya Range; Altai Mountains | Altai Republic | | |
| Deavgay (Note: Gora Deavgay, Russia at Peakbagger.com "Gora Deavgay". PeakVisor.) | Деавгай | 4019 m 13,186 ft | | | 41°29′48″N 47°19′34″E | Greater Caucasus | Dagestan | | |

=== 3000 to 3999 meters ===
| Peak | Russian name | Elevation | Prominence | Isolation | Coordinates | Range or Landform | Federal subject | Image | Notes |
|---|---|---|---|---|---|---|---|---|---|
| Gvandra (Note: Gora Gvandra, Russia/Georgia at Peakbagger.com) | Гвандра | 3985 m 13,074 ft | 825 m 2,707 ft | 28.2 km 17.55 mi | 43°12′18″N 42°04′49″E | Greater Caucasus | Karachay-Cherkessia | | |
| Mongun-Taiga (Note: Gora Mungun-Tayga, Russia at Peakbagger.com "Gora Mungun-Tayga". PeakVisor.) | Монгу́н-Тайга́ | 3970 m 13,025 ft | 1685 m 5,528 ft | 59.4 km 36.9 mi | 50°16′46″N 90°07′12″E | Altai Mountains | Tuva | | Highest peak of Tuva |
| Khalatsa (Note: Khalaca, Russia/Georgia at Peakbagger.com) | Халаца | 3938 m 12,920 ft | 1118 m 3,668 ft | 14.76 km 9.17 mi | 42°35′53″N 43°50′04″E | Greater Caucasus | North Ossetia–Alania (Note: On the border between South Ossetia, a partially recognized state that is widely considered territory of Georgia, and Russia) | | Highest peak of South Ossetia |
| Belalakaya | Белалакая | 3861 m 12,667 ft | 538 m 1,765 ft | 5.9 km 3.67 mi | 43°15′54″N 41°35′05″E | Greater Caucasus | Karachay-Cherkessia | | |
| Zekara (Note: Zekara, Russia at Peakbagger.com) | Зекара | 3828 m 12,559 ft | 834 m 2,736 ft | 9.3 km 5.78 mi | 42°33′58″N 43°56′42″E | Greater Caucasus | North Ossetia–Alania | | |
| Pshish | Пшиш | 3791 m 12,438 ft | 1052 m 3,451 ft | 21.5 km 13.36 mi | 43°24′32″N 41°09′34″E | Greater Caucasus | Karachay-Cherkessia | | |
| Ostry Tolbachik (Note: Mount Ostry Tolbachik, Russia at Peakbagger.com "Gora Ostryy Tolbachik". PeakVisor.) | Острый Толбачик | 3672 m 12,047 ft | 2190 m 7,185 ft | 25.7 km 15.94 mi | 55°49′51″N 160°19′33″E | Tolbachik; Eastern Ridge; Kamchatka Peninsula | Kamchatka Krai | | Highest peak of Tolbachik volcanic complex |
| Karakaya | Каракая | 3646 m 11,962 ft | | | 43°01′04″N 43°14′44″E | Skalisty Range, Caucasus; Kabardino-Balkaria | Kabardino-Balkaria | | Highest peak of the Skalisty Range, North Caucasus |
| Ichinsky (Note: Ichinskaya Sopka, Russia at Peakbagger.com "Vulkan Ichinskaya Sopka". PeakVisor.) | Ичинский | 3607 m 11,834 ft | 3125 m 10,253 ft | 164.2 km 102.1 mi | 55°40′44″N 157°43′20″E | Sredinny Range; Kamchatka Peninsula | Kamchatka Krai | | Highest peak of the Sredinny Range |
| Kronotsky (Note: Kronotskaya Sopka, Russia at Peakbagger.com "Vulkan Kronotskaya Sopka". PeakVisor.) | Кроно́цкий | 3528 m 11,575 ft | 2737 m 8,980 ft | 120.6 km 74.9 mi | 54°45′12″N 160°31′36″E | Eastern Ridge; Kamchatka Peninsula | Kamchatka Krai | | |
| Mönkh Saridag (Note: Gora Munku-Sardyk, Russia/Mongolia at Peakbagger.com "Munku-sardik". PeakVisor.) | Мунку-Сардык | 3491 m 11,453 ft | 1578 m 5,177 ft | 466 km 289 mi | 51°43′08″N 100°35′49″E | Bolshoy Sayan; Sayan Mountains | Buryatia (Note: On the border between Mongolia and Russia) | | Highest peak in the Sayan Mountains; Highest mountain in Buryatia |
| Koryaksky (Note: Koryakskaya Sopka, Russia at Peakbagger.com "Koryaksky". PeakVisor.) | Коря́кский | 3456 m 11,339 ft | 2999 m 9,839 ft | 199 km 123.6 mi | 53°19′15″N 158°42′45″E | Kamchatka Peninsula | Kamchatka Krai | | |
| Tydtuyaryk | Тыдтуярык | 3367 m 11,047 ft | 936 m 3,071 ft | 42.5 km 26.4 mi | 50°08′45″N 88°25′59″E | Kuray Mountains; Altai Mountains | Altai Republic | | |
| Tsakhvoa | Цахвоа | 3340 m 10,958 ft | 1072 m 3,517 ft | 50.4 km 31.3 mi | 43°40′19″N 40°34′40″E | Greater Caucasus | Krasnodar Krai | | Highest point of Krasnodar Krai |
| Shiveluch (Note: Vulkan Shiveluch, Russia at Peakbagger.com "Shiveluch". PeakVisor.) | Шивелуч | 3307 m 10,850 ft | 3168 m 10,394 ft | 77.5 km 48.2 mi | 56°39′12″N 161°21′42″E | Kamchatka Peninsula | Kamchatka Krai | | Northernmost active volcano in Kamchatka Krai |
| Agepsta | Агепста | 3261 m 10,699 ft | 1194 m 3,917 ft | 15.8 km 9.82 mi | 43°32′54″N 40°28′50″E | Gagra Range; Greater Caucasus | Krasnodar Krai | | Highest peak of the Gagra Range |
| Chugush (Note: Gora Chugush, Russia at Peakbagger.com "Gora Chugush". PeakVisor.) | Чугуш | 3238 m 10,623 ft | 1332 m 4,370 ft | 21.1 km 13.11 mi | 43°48′05″N 40°12′09″E | Greater Caucasus | Adygea; Krasnodar Krai | | Highest mountain in Adygea |
| Tabozhok | Табожок | 3201 m 10,502 ft | 633 m 2,077 ft | 22.4 km 13.92 mi | 50°04′51″N 88°50′34″E | Kuray Mountains; Altai Mountains | Altai Republic | | |
| Гайкомд | Гайкомд | 3152 m 10,341 ft | 1231 m 4,039 ft | 9.8 km 6.09 mi | 42°50′25″N 44°47′54″E | Skalisty Range; Greater Caucasus | Ingushetia | | |
| Khoyto-Ula (Note: Khrebet Kropotkina High Point, Russia at Peakbagger.com "Hoito-ula". PeakVisor.) | Хойто-Ула | 3149 m 10,331 ft | 1472 m 4,829 ft | 95.9 km 59.6 mi | 52°50′36″N 99°41′39″E | Kropotkin Range; Eastern Sayan | Buryatia | | Highest peak of the Kropotkin Range (Eastern Sayan) |
| Zimina (Note: Gora Oval'naya Zimina, Russia at Peakbagger.com "Gora Oval'naya Zimina". PeakVisor.) | Зимина | 3080 m 10,105 ft | 1570 m 5,151 ft | 15.28 km 9.49 mi | 55°51′39″N 160°36′21″E | Eastern Ridge; Kamchatka Peninsula | Kamchatka Krai | | |
| BAM Peak (Note: Pik BAM, Russia at Peakbagger.com "Pik BAM". PeakVisor.) | Пик БАМ | 3072 m 10,079 ft | 2230 m 7,316 ft | 1,228 km 763 mi | 56°51′54″N 117°34′47″E | Kodar Mountains; Stanovoy Highlands | Zabaykalsky Krai | | Highest peak of the Kodar Mountains and the Stanovoy Highlands |
| Muisky Gigant (Note: Yuzhno Muiskyy Khrebet High Point, Russia at Peakbagger.com "HP Yuzhno Muiskyy Khrebet". PeakVisor.) | Муйский Гигант | 3067 m 10,062 ft | 2107 m 6,913 ft | 217 km 135.1 mi | 55°58′38″N 114°26′21″E | Southern Muya Range; Stanovoy Highlands | Buryatia | | Highest peak of the Southern Muya Range |
| Myat-Loam | Столовая Гора | 3003 m 9,852 ft | 874 m 2,867 ft | | 42°51′57″N 44°42′00″E | Skalisty Range; Greater Caucasus | Ingushetia | | |
| Pobeda (Note: Gora Pobeda, Russia at Peakbagger.com "Gora Pobeda". Peakware.com. Archived from the original on 2016-03-04. "Gora Pobeda". PeakVisor.) | Победа | 3003 m 9,852 ft | 2443 m 8,015 ft | 1,234 km 767 mi | 65°10′32″N 146°00′27″E | Ulakhan-Chistay; Chersky Range | Yakutia | | Highest peak of the Chersky Range; Highest mountain of Yakutia |

=== 2000 to 2999 meters ===
| Peak | Russian name | Elevation | Prominence | Isolation | Coordinates | Range or Landform | Federal subject | Image | Notes |
|---|---|---|---|---|---|---|---|---|---|
| Kyzlasov Peak | Пик Кызласова | 2969 m 9,741 ft | | | 51°39′06″N 89°12′05″E | Western Sayan; Sayan Mountains | Khakassia | | Highest peak of Khakassia |
| Muskunnah (Note: "Отчет о лыжном спортивном туристском походе 6-ой категории сложности по Кодару". tourism.ru (in Russian). Archived from the original on 2013-05-12. "Восточная часть Кодарского хребта, или Восточный Кодар, представлена Апсатским, Южно-Торским и Сулуматским горными массивами. Высшей точкой Восточного Кодара является пик Мускуннах (Солнечный, 2966), расположенный в верховьях одноименного ручья." North Kodar Group High Point, Russia at Peakbagger.com "Muskunnah". PeakVisor. "North Kodar Group HP". peakery.) | Мускуннах | 2966 m 9,731 ft | 1810 m 5,938 ft | 37.9 km 23.6 mi | 57°07′18″N 117°59′18″E | Kodar Mountains; Stanovoy Highlands | Zabaykalsky Krai | | |
| Mus-Khaya (Note: Mus-Khaya, Russia at Peakbagger.com "Gora Mus-Khaya". PeakVisor.) | Мус-Хая | 2959 m 9,708 ft | 1902 m 6,240 ft | 379 km 235 mi | 62°36′12″N 140°56′21″E | Suntar-Khayata Range | Yakutia | | Highest peak of the Suntar-Khayata Range |
| Berill (Note: Byerill, Russia at Peakbagger.com) | Берилл | 2934 m 9,626 ft | 1904 m 6,247 ft | 0.24 km 0.15 mi | 62°23′35″N 141°19′36″E | Suntar-Khayata Range | Khabarovsk Krai | | Highest peak of Khabarovsk Krai |
| Zhupanovsky (Note: Vulkan Zhupanovsky, Russia at Peakbagger.com "Sopka Zhupanovskaya". PeakVisor.) | Жупановский | 2923 m 9,590 ft | 2210 m 7,251 ft | 40.8 km 25.3 mi | 53°35′18″N 159°08′54″E | Eastern Ridge; Kamchatka Peninsula | Kamchatka Krai | | Volcanic massif |
| Grandiozny Peak (Note: Pik Grandiozniyy, Russia at Peakbagger.com "Grandioznii". PeakVisor.) | Пик Грандиозный | 2922 m 9,587 ft | 1560 m 5,118 ft | 85.8 km 53.3 mi | 53°53′36″N 96°00′27″E | Kryzhin Range; Eastern Sayan | Krasnoyarsk Krai | | Highest point of Krasnoyarsk Krai |
| Bolshaya Udina (Note: Mount Bolshaya Udina at Peakbagger.com "Gora Bol'shaya Udina". PeakVisor.) | Большая Удина | 2920 m 9,580 ft | 1630 m 5,348 ft | 10.04 km 6.24 mi | 55°45′30″N 160°31′36″E | Eastern Ridge; Kamchatka Peninsula | Kamchatka Krai | | Volcanic massif |
| Bezymianny | Безымянный | 2906 m 9,534 ft | 449 m 1,473 ft | 4.5 km 2.8 mi | 55°58′42″N 160°35′12″E | Kluchevskaya volcano group Eastern Ridge; Kamchatka Peninsula | Kamchatka Krai | | Stratovolcano |
| Pik Tofalariya (Note: Bolshoi Sayan Range High Point, Russia at Peakbagger.com "N-47". Topographic USSR Chart (in Russian).) | Пик Тофалария | 2892 m 9,488 ft | 1469 m 4,820 ft | 165.5 km 102.8 mi | 53°38′27″N 97°14′15″E | Sayan Mountains | Irkutsk Oblast | | |
| Fisht (Note: Gora Fisht at Peakbagger.com "Mount Fisht". PeakVisor.) | Фишт | 2867 m 9,406 ft | 1383 m 4,537 ft | 27.9 km 17.34 mi | 43°56′28″N 39°54′07″E | Greater Caucasus | Adygea | | |
| Pik Baikal (Note: Barguzinskiy High Point, Russia at Peakbagger.com "Pik Baikal". PeakVisor.) | пик Байкал | 2840 m 9,318 ft | 1722 m 5,650 ft | 294 km 182.7 mi | 54°37′18″N 110°27′21″E | Barguzin Range; South Siberian Mountains | Buryatia | | Highest peak in Barguzin Range |
| Oshten | Оштен | 2789 m 9,150 ft | 1305 m 4,281 ft | 26.6 km 16.53 mi | 43°59′55″N 39°55′55″E | Greater Caucasus | Adygea | | |
| Gora Uchemdek | Гора Учемдек | 2806 m 9,206 ft | 1426 m 4,678 ft | 56.4 km 35 mi | 50°31′32″N 85°43′27″E | | Altai Republic | | |
| Shivit-Taiga | Шивит-Тайга | 2765 m 9,072 ft | | | 52°26′45″N 98°24′15″E | Azas Plateau; Western Sayan; Sayan Mountains; South Siberian Mountains | Tuva | | Stratovolcano |
| Pshekha-Su | Пшеха-Су | 2743 m 8,999 ft | 499 m 1,637 ft | 3.2 km 1.99 mi | 43°59′23″N 39°53′28″E | Greater Caucasus | Adygea | | |
| Gora Druza | Гора Друза | 2744 m 9,003 ft | 1423 m 4,669 ft | 84.8 km 52.7 mi | 61°57′47″N 143°00′57″E | Suntar-Khayata Range; East Siberian Mountains | Khabarovsk Krai; Yakutia | | |
| Avachinsky (Note: Avachinsky V., Russia at Peakbagger.com "Vulkan Avachinskaya Sopka". PeakVisor.) | Авачинский | 2741 m 8,993 ft | 1550 m 5,085 ft | 9.85 km 6.12 mi | 53°15′18″N 158°49′48″E | Kamchatka Peninsula | Kamchatka Krai | | |
| Gora Chyon (Note: Khrebet Silyapskiy-Gora Chen, Russia at Peakbagger.com "Gora Chën". PeakVisor. "Гора Чён (Чёнг)". Wikimapia.) | Гора Чён | 2690 m 8,825 ft | 1740 m 5,709 ft | 189.2 km 117.6 mi | 65°17′03″N 141°48′10″E | Silyap Range; Chersky Range | Yakutia | | Highest of the Silyap Range. Ultra |
| Upper Angara Range High Point (Note: Verkhne-Angarskiy Khrebet High Point, Russia at Peakbagger.com "Bezimyannii". PeakVisor.) | Верхнеангарский хребет Высокая точка | 2641 m 8,665 ft | 1819 m 5,968 ft | 151.4 km 94 mi | 56°21′21″N 111°38′51″E | Verkhne-Angarskiy Range; Stanovoy Highlands | Buryatia | | |
| Khuvkhoitun (Note: Gora Khuvkhoitun, Russia at Peakbagger.com "Khuvkhoitun". PeakVisor.) | Хувхойтун | 2616 m 8,583 ft | 1920 m 6,299 ft | 145.2 km 90.2 mi | 57°55′15″N 160°40′33″E | Sredinny Range; Kamchatka Peninsula | Kamchatka Krai | | Stratovolcano |
| Khakandya (Note: Hakandya, Russia at Peakbagger.com "Gora Hakandya". PeakVisor.) | Гора Хакандя | 2615 m 8,579 ft | 1545 m 5,069 ft | 38.7 km 24 mi | 61°36′02″N 142°50′14″E | Suntar-Khayata Range; East Siberian Mountains | Khabarovsk Krai | | Ultra |
| Alney-Chashakondzha (Note: Alney, Russia at Peakbagger.com "Gora Alney". PeakVisor.) | Алней-Чашаконджа | 2598 m 8,524 ft | 1825 m 5,988 ft | 72.7 km 45.2 mi | 56°41′33″N 159°38′42″E | Sredinny Range; Kamchatka Peninsula | Kamchatka Krai | | Stratovolcano |
| Gora Cherskogo (Note: Gora Cherskoga, Russia at Peakbagger.com "Gora Cherskogo". PeakVisor.) | Гора Черского | 2588 m 8,491 ft | 1596 m 5,236 ft | 111.2 km 69.1 mi | 55°03′56″N 108°41′06″E | Baikal Mountains; South Siberian Mountains | Buryatia; Irkutsk Oblast | | Ultra, highest of the Baikal Range |
| Gamchen (Note: Gora Gamchen, Russia at Peakbagger.com "Gora Gamchen". PeakVisor.) | Гамчен | 2577 m 8,455 ft | 1737 m 5,699 ft | 25.7 km 15.99 mi | 54°58′27″N 160°42′12″E | Eastern Ridge; Kamchatka Peninsula | Kamchatka Krai | | Complex volcano |
| Ikat Range High Point | Икатский Высокая точка | 2574 m 8,445 ft | | | 55°01′53″N 111°50′04″E | Ikat Range | Buryatia | | Highest peak of the Ikat Range |
| Udokan High Point | Удокан Высокая точка | 2570 m 8,432 ft | | | 56°40′20″N 119°07′32″E | Udokan Range; Stanovoy Highlands | Zabaykalsky Krai | | Highest peak of the Udokan |
| Ledyanaya (Note: Ledyanaya, Russia at Peakbagger.com "Ledyakaya". PeakVisor.) | Ледяная | 2562 m 8,406 ft | 2446 m 8,025 ft | 734 km 456 mi | 61°53′20″N 171°10′09″E | Ukelayat Range; Koryak Mountains | Kamchatka Krai | | Highest peak of the Koryak Mountains |
| Shish | Шиш | 2491 m 8,173 ft | 1647 m 5,404 ft | 35.3 km 21.9 mi | 55°45′06″N 161°10′37″E | Kumroch Range; Eastern Range; Kamchatka Peninsula | Kamchatka Krai | | Highest peak of the Kumroch Range |
| Skalisty Golets | Скалистый Голец | 2462 m 8,077 ft | 344 m 1,129 ft | 90.2 km 56 mi | 56°24′01″N 119°05′45″E | Kalar Range | Zabaykalsky Krai | | Highest peak of the Kalar Range |
| Bystrinsky Golets | Быстринский Голец | 2517 m 8,258 ft | 1052 m 3,451 ft | 234 km 145.2 mi | 49°43′0″N 109°57′0″E | Chikokon Range; Khentei-Daur Highlands | Zabaykalsky Krai | | Highest peak of the Khentei-Daur Highlands |
| Inyaptuk Golets | Иняптук Голец | 2514 m 8,248 ft | | | 56°24′14″N 111°5′7″E | Synnyr Massif | Buryatia | | Highest peak of the North Baikal Highlands |
| Golets Sokhondo | Голец Сохондо | 2504 m 8,215 ft | 934 m 3,064 ft | | 49°43′11.86″N 111°05′6.49″E | Khentei Range; Khentei-Daur Highlands | Zabaykalsky Krai | | Highest peak of the Khentei Range |
| Mayak Shangina | Маяк Шангина | 2489 m 8,166 ft | 892 m 2,927 ft | 54.1 km 33.6 mi | 50°46′38″N 84°32′04″E | Korgon Range; Altai Mountains | Altai Krai | | Highest point in Altai Krai |
| Pik Aradansky | Пик Араданский | 2460 m 8,071 ft | 1445 m 4,741 ft | 71.7 km 44.6 mi | 52°33′45″N 93°05′46″E | Aradansky Range; Western Sayan; Sayan Mountains; South Siberian Mountains | Krasnoyarsk Krai | | |
| Opala (Note: Vulkan Opala, Russia at Peakbagger.com "Opala". PeakVisor.) | Опала | 2460 m 8,071 ft | 2070 m 6,791 ft | 124.8 km 77.5 mi | 52°32′36″N 157°20′21″E | Eastern Ridge; Kamchatka Peninsula | Kamchatka Krai | | Stratovolcano |
| Skalisty Golets | Скалистый голец | 2412 m 7,913 ft | | | 55°51′N 130°43′E | Stanovoy Range | Yakutia | | Highest point of the Stanovoy Range |
| Orulgan HP | Орулган АВ | 2409 m 7,904 ft | 1690 m 5,545 ft | 719 km 447 mi | 67°34′56″N 128°08′41″E | Orulgan Range | Yakutia | | Highest point of the Verkhoyansk Range |
| Ohogos | Охогос | 2385 m 7,825 ft | 1398 m 4,587 ft | 115.5 km 71.8 mi | 65°30′15″N 142°49′58″E | | Yakutia | | |
| Toko-Stanovik HP | Токинский Становик АВ | 2380 m 7,808 ft | 1683 m 5,522 ft | 669 km 416 mi | 55°53′48″N 130°27′11″E | Toko-Stanovik; Stanovoy Range | Yakutia | | Highest point of the Toko-Stanovik, Stanovoy Range |
| Kizimen (Note: Kizimen V., Russia at Peakbagger.com "Vulkan Kizimen". PeakVisor.) | Кизимен | 2375 m 7,792 ft | 1530 m 5,020 ft | 29.8 km 18.52 mi | 55°07′51″N 160°19′12″E | Eastern Ridge; Kamchatka Peninsula | Kamchatka Krai | | |
| Taikan HP | Тайкан АВ | 2370 m 7,776 ft | 1915 m 6,283 ft | | 53°36′25.2″N 134°34′30″E | Taikan Range | Khabarovsk Krai | | Highest peak of the Taikan Range |
| Gora Shaman (Note: Shaman, Russia at Peakbagger.com "Gora Shaman". PeakVisor.) | гора Шаман | 2363 m 7,753 ft | 1596 m 5,236 ft | 56.9 km 35.3 mi | 56°04′09″N 115°51′42″E | Southern Muya Range | Zabaykalsky Krai | | |
| Alaid (Note: Vulkan Alaid, Russia at Peakbagger.com "Alaid". PeakVisor.) | Алаид | 2339 m 7,674 ft | 2339 m 7,674 ft | 224 km 139.2 mi | 50°51′39″N 155°33′51″E | Atlasov Island; Kuril Islands | Sakhalin Oblast | | Highest volcano of the Kuril Islands |
| Okhandya HP | Охандя АВ | 2337 m 7,667 ft | | | 63°38′29″N 147°50′37″E | Okhandya Range; Chersky Range | Magadan Oblast | | Highest point of Magadan Oblast |
| Gora Pik Geodezista | Гора Пик Геодезиста | 2301 m 7,549 ft | 1465 m 4,806 ft | 663 km 412 mi | 56°00′53″N 130°28′03″E | Stanovoy Range | Yakutia | | |
| Mutnovsky (Note: Mutnovsky V., Russia at Peakbagger.com "Mutnovskaya". PeakVisor.) | Мутновский | 2322 m 7,618 ft | 1750 m 5,741 ft | 59 km 36.7 mi | 52°26′54″N 158°11′51″E | Eastern Ridge; Kamchatka Peninsula | Kamchatka Krai | | Complex volcano |
| Taunshits (Note: Sopka Taunshits, Russia at Peakbagger.com "Taunshic". PeakVisor.) | Тауншиц | 2353 m 7,720 ft | 1550 m 5,085 ft | 51.3 km 31.9 mi | 54°31′42″N 159°15′15″E | Eastern Ridge; Kamchatka Peninsula | Kamchatka Krai | | Stratovolcano |
| Chubuku Taala | Чубуку Таала | 2283 m 7,490 ft | 1518 m 4,980 ft | 72 km 44.7 mi | 65°56′36″N 146°38′27″E | Chersky Range; East Siberian Mountains | Yakutia | | |
| Bakening (Note: Gora Bakening, Russia at Peakbagger.com "Gora Bakening". PeakVisor.) | Бакенинг | 2276 m 7,467 ft | 1610 m 5,282 ft | 71.3 km 44.3 mi | 53°54′18″N 158°04′00″E | Eastern Ridge; Kamchatka Peninsula | Kamchatka Krai | | Stratovolcano |
| Gorod-Makit | Город-Макит | 2298 m 7,539 ft | 1843 m 6,047 ft | 455 km 283 mi | 52°57′12″N 134°39′23″E | Yam-Alin | Amur Oblast; Khabarovsk Krai | | Highest peak of the Yam-Alin range |
| Sunnagyn HP | Суннагын АВ | 2246 m 7,369 ft | | | 57°57′18″N 129°15′58″E | Sunnagyn Range | Yakutia | | Highest point of the Aldan Highlands |
| Gora Ulun | Улун | 2221 m 7,287 ft | 1384 m 4,541 ft | | 50°30′32″N 134°19′35″E | Badzhal Range | Khabarovsk Krai | | Highest peak of the Badzhal Range |
| Staraya Krepost | Старая Крепость | 2207 m 7,241 ft | 1390 m 4,560 ft | 190.7 km 118.5 mi | 53°51′35″N 89°18′01″E | Kharatas ridge Kuznetsk Alatau | Khakassia | | Highest peak of Kuznetsk Alatau |
| Verkhniy Zub | Верхний Зуб | 2178 m 7,146 ft | 385 m 1,263 ft | 4.7 km 2.92 mi | 53°50′17″N 89°14′14″E | Kuznetsk Alatau | Kemerovo Oblast; Khakassia | | Highest point in Kemerovo Oblast |
| Alburi-Lam | Албури-Лам | 2177 m 7,142 ft | 74 m 243 ft | 1.1 km 0.68 mi | 42°56′06″N 46°31′56″E | Greater Caucasus | Dagestan | | |
| Kambalny (Note: Vulkan Kambalny, Russia at Peakbagger.com "Kambalny Volcano". PeakVisor.) | Камбальный | 2161 m 7,090 ft | 1970 m 6,463 ft | 104.1 km 64.7 mi | 51°18′20″N 156°52′31″E | Eastern Ridge; Kamchatka Peninsula | Kamchatka Krai | | Southernmost active volcano of Kamchatka |
| Vilyuchinsky (Note: Vulkan Vilyuchinsky, Russia at Peakbagger.com "Vulkan Vilyuchinskaya Sopka". PeakVisor.) | Вилю́чинский | 2173 m 7,129 ft | 1610 m 5,282 ft | 28.7 km 17.85 mi | 52°42′18″N 158°16′54″E | Eastern Ridge; Kamchatka Peninsula | Kamchatka Krai | | Stratovolcano |
| Sette-Daban HP | Сетте-Дабан АВ | 2102 m 6,896 ft | | | 62°41′09″N 138°26′15″E | Sette-Daban | Sakha Republic | | Highest peak of the Sette-Daban |
| Pik Cherskogo | Пик Черского | 2084 m 6,837 ft | 352 m 1,155 ft | 17.1 km 10.63 mi | 51°30′56″N 103°37′33″E | Komarinsky Range; Khamar-Daban; South Siberian Mountains | Irkutsk Oblast | | |
| Tordoki Yani (Note: Gora Tardoki-Yani, Russia at Peakbagger.com "Tordoki Yani". PeakVisor.) | Тордоки-Яни | 2090 m 6,857 ft | 1989 m 6,526 ft | 292 km 181.4 mi | 48°53′47″N 138°03′12″E | Sikhote-Alin | Khabarovsk Krai | | Highest peak of Sikhote-Alin |
| Khodutka (Note: Khodutka V., Russia at Peakbagger.com "Khodutka". PeakVisor.) | Ходутка | 2089 m 6,854 ft | 1810 m 5,938 ft | 53.9 km 33.5 mi | 52°03′45″N 157°42′36″E | Eastern Ridge; Kamchatka Peninsula | Kamchatka Krai | | Stratovolcano |
| Kropotkin | Кропоткин | 2062 m 6,765 ft | 85 m 279 ft | 4.2 km 2.61 mi | 52°42′14″N 99°00′00″E | Jom-Bolok; East Sayan; Sayan Mountains; South Siberian Mountains | Buryatia | | Volcano |
| Saltag-Tas (Note: Khrebet Saltaga-Tas High Point, Russia at Peakbagger.com) | Салтага-Тас | 2021 m 6,631 ft | 1622 m 5,322 ft | 0.15 km 0.09 mi | 68°21′27″N 140°4′37″E | Selennyakh Range; Chersky Range | Yakutia | | Ultra |
| Vulkan Schmidta | Вулкан Шмидта | 2020 m 6,627 ft | 790 m 2,592 ft | 8.8 km 5.47 mi | 54°55′12″N 160°37′48″E | Eastern Ridge; Kamchatka Peninsula | Kamchatka Krai | | Shield volcano |
| Skalisty Range HP | Скалистый хребет АВ | 2102 m 6,896 ft | | | 63°32′20″N 138°52′55″E | Skalisty Range | Sakha Republic | | Highest peak of the Skalisty Range |
| Akitkan HP | Акиткан АВ | 2067 m 6,781 ft | | | 56°14′N 108°49′E | Akitkan Range, North Baikal Highlands | Irkutsk Oblast | | Highest peak of the Akitkan Range |
| Ko (Note: Gora Ko, Russia at Peakbagger.com) | Ко | 2004 m 6,575 ft | 1178 m 3,865 ft | 226 km 140.6 mi | 47°06′58″N 136°34′05″E | Sikhote-Alin | Khabarovsk Krai | | |

=== 1000 to 1999 meters ===
| Peak | Russian name | Elevation | Prominence | Isolation | Coordinates | Range or Landform | Federal subject | Image | Notes |
|---|---|---|---|---|---|---|---|---|---|
| Zheltovsky (Note: Vulkan Zheltovsky, Russia at Peakbagger.com "Zheltovskaya Sopka". PeakVisor. "Zheltovsky". Global Volcanism Program. Smithsonian Institution.) | Желтовский | 1957 m 6,421 ft | 1730 m 5,676 ft | 43.1 km 26.8 mi | 51°34′36″N 157°19′42″E | Eastern Ridge; Kamchatka Peninsula | Kamchatka Krai | | Stratovolcano |
| Sietinden High Point | Сиетиндэнский Высокая точка | 1929 m 6,329 ft | | | 69°26′19″N 129°28′12″E | Sietinden; Verkhoyansk Range | Sakha Republic | | Highest of the Sietinden Range |
| Nelgesin High Point | Нельгесинский Высокая точка | 1926 m 6,319 ft | | | 65°59′21″N 135°51′58″E | Nelgesin Range; Yana-Oymyakon Highlands; Chersky Range | Sakha Republic | | Highest of the Nelgesin Range |
| Anik | Аник | 1922 m 6,306 ft | 882 m 2,894 ft | 38.2 km 23.7 mi | 47°15′36″N 137°01′19″E | Sikhote-Alin | Khabarovsk Krai; Primorsky Krai | | Highest peak of Primorsky Krai |
| Golets Kropotkin | Голец Кропоткина | 1907 m 6,257 ft | 850 m 2,789 ft | 238 km 147.6 mi | 53°43′37″N 117°33′30″E | Muroy Range; Olyokma-Stanovik | Zabaykalsky Krai | | Olyokma-Stanovik Highlands HP |
| Narodnaya (Note: Gora Narodnaya, Russia at Peakbagger.com "Mount Narodnaya". PeakVisor. "Narodnaya". Peakware.com. Archived from the original on 2016-03-04.) | Народная | 1895 m 6,217 ft | 1772 m 5,814 ft | 1,835 km 1,140 mi | 65°02′10″N 60°06′45″E | Research Range; Ural Mountains | Khanty-Mansi Autonomous Okrug; Komi Republic | | Highest peak of the Ural Mountains |
| Iskhodnaya (Note: Chantalskiy Khrebet High Point at Peakbagger.com "1887". PeakVisor.) | Исходная | 1887 m 6,191 ft | 1492 m 4,895 ft | 723 km 450 mi | 67°48′59″N 178°17′19″E | Chantal Range; Chukotka Mountains | Chukotka Autonomous Okrug | | Highest peak of the Chukotka Mountains |
| Gora Konus (Note: Gora Konus, Russia at Peakbagger.com "Gora Konus". PeakVisor. "Конус". Wikimapia.) | Гора Конус | 1864 m 6,115 ft | 1309 m 4,295 ft | 113.6 km 70.6 mi | 57°31′57″N 131°48′57″E | | Khabarovsk Krai | | |
| Oblachnaya (Note: Gora Oblachnaya, Russia at Peakbagger.com "Gora Oblachnaya". PeakVisor.) | Облачная | 1855 m 6,086 ft | 1426 m 4,678 ft | 421 km 262 mi | 43°41′45″N 134°11′57″E | Sikhote-Alin | Primorsky Krai | | Second highest point in Primorsky Krai |
| Chikurachki (Note: Vulkan Chikurachki, Russia at Peakbagger.com "Čikurački". PeakVisor.) | Чикурачки | 1816 m 5,958 ft | 1816 m 5,958 ft | 59.4 km 36.9 mi | 50°19′24″N 155°27′39″E | Paramushir; Kuril Islands | Sakhalin Oblast | | Highest peak of Paramushir |
| Oloy Range HP | Олойский Высокая точка | 1816 m 5,958 ft | 1310 m 4,298 ft | 448 km 278 mi | 66°01′30″N 163°14′12″E | Oloy Range; Kolyma Highlands | Chukotka Autonomous Okrug | | Highest peak of the Oloy Range |
| Gora Dvukh Tsirkov | гора Двух Цирков | 1785 m 5,856 ft | | | 67°30′58″N 168°07′15″E | Ilirney Range; Anadyr Highlands | Chukotka Autonomous Okrug | | Highest peak of the Anadyr Highlands |
| Pik Blokhin | Пик Блохина | 1779 m 5,837 ft | 1018 m 3,340 ft | 31.9 km 19.82 mi | 67°06′06″N 166°51′38″E | Anyuy Mountains; East Siberian Mountains | Chukotka Autonomous Okrug | | Highest peak of the Anyuy Mountains |
| Fussa (Note: Pik Fuss, Russia at Peakbagger.com "Fuss Peak". PeakVisor.) | Фусса | 1772 m 5,814 ft | 1630 m 5,348 ft | 15.58 km 9.68 mi | 50°16′03″N 155°14′51″E | Paramushir; Kuril Islands | Sakhalin Oblast | | |
| Tyatya (Note: Vulkan Tyatya, Russia at Peakbagger.com "Vulkan Tyatya". PeakVisor.) | Тятя | 1772 m 5,814 ft | 1772 m 5,814 ft | 256 km 158.8 mi | 44°21′12″N 146°15′23″E | Kunashir Island; Kuril Islands | Sakhalin Oblast | | Highest peak of Kunashir Island |
| Pik Sovetskoy Gvardii | Пик Советской Гвардии | 1759 m 5,771 ft | 1172 m 3,845 ft | 527 km 327 mi | 66°49′58″N 166°36′20″E | Anyuy Mountains | Chukotka Autonomous Okrug | | Second highest peak of the Anyuy Mountains |
| Tryokhgolovy Golets | Трёхголовый Голец | 1,728 metres (5,669 ft) | | | 53°51′54″N 107°52′29″E | Primorsky Range | Irkutsk Oblast | | Highest in Primorsky Range |
| Kontalaksky Golets | Конталакский Голец | 1,706 metres (5,597 ft) | | | 53°54′47″N 115°41′35″E | Yablonoi Mountains | Zabaykalsky Krai | | Highest in Yablonoi Mountains |
| Kamen (Note: Gora Kamen at Peakbagger.com "Kamen". PeakVisor. Russia. Topographic map R-45,46; M 1: 1 000 000) | Камень | 1701 m 5,581 ft | 1325 m 4,347 ft | 1,279 km 794 mi | 69°07′52″N 95°04′02″E | Putorana; Central Siberian Plateau | Krasnoyarsk Krai | | Highest peak of the Putorana and the Central Siberian Plateau |
| Alkhanay | Алханай | 1662 m 5,453 ft | 611 m 2,005 ft | 94.1 km 58.5 mi | 50°52′31″N 113°22′33″E | Mogoytuysky Range | Zabaykalsky Krai | | |
| Manaraga | Манарага | 1662 m 5,453 ft | 648 m 2,126 ft | 13.1 km 8.14 mi | 65°02′52″N 59°45′46″E | Subarctic Ural; Ural Mountains | Komi Republic | | |
| Golets Chingikhan | Голец Чингикан | 1,644 metres (5,394 ft) | | | 52°46′43″N 114°29′14″E | Chersky Range (Transbaikalia) | Zabaykalsky Krai | | Highest in Chesrky Range (TB) |
| Yamantau (Note: Gora Yamantau, Russia at Peakbagger.com "Mount Yamantau". PeakVisor. "Mount Yamantau". Wikimapia.) | Ямантау | 1638 m 5,374 ft | 1330 m 4,364 ft | 1,151 km 715 mi | 54°15′18″N 58°06′17″E | Southern Ural; Ural Mountains | Bashkortostan | | Highest peak in the Southern Ural |
| Stokap (Note: Gora Stokap, Russia at Peakbagger.com "Stokap". PeakVisor. "Nishihitokappuyama [Bogatyr Ridge]". Global Volcanism Program. Smithsonian Institution.) | Стокап | 1634 m 5,361 ft | 1634 m 5,361 ft | 102.4 km 63.6 mi | 44°50′15″N 147°20′33″E | Bogatyr Ridge; Iturup; Kuril Islands | Sakhalin Oblast | | Highest peak of Iturup |
| Arga Ynnakh Khaya | Арга Ыннах Хая | 1,622 metres (5,322 ft) | | | 67°25′N 134°52′E | Chersky Range | Yakutia | | "Mother Mountain", important in Yakut culture |
| Lopatina (Note: Gora Lopatina, Russia at Peakbagger.com "Gora Lopatina". PeakVisor.) | Лопатина | 1609 m 5,279 ft | 1609 m 5,279 ft | 283 km 175.5 mi | 50°51′06″N 143°08′30″E | Sakhalin | Sakhalin Oblast | | Highest peak of Sakhalin |
| Bogdan Khmelnitskiy (Note: Bogdan Khmelnitskiy, Russia at Peakbagger.com) | Богдан Хмельницкий | 1587 m 5,207 ft | 1552 m 5,092 ft | 71.5 km 44.4 mi | 45°20′15″N 147°55′13″E | Chirip Peninsula; Iturup; Kuril Islands | Sakhalin Oblast | | Volcano |
| Bolshoy Iremel | Большой Иремель | 1582 m 5,190 ft | 771 m 2,530 ft | 56.2 km 34.9 mi | 54°31′13″N 58°50′33″E | Southern Ural; Ural Mountains | Bashkortostan | | |
| Mustag | Мустаг | 1565 m 5,135 ft | 946 m 3,104 ft | 51.7 km 32.1 mi | 53°00′35″N 87°57′47″E | Gornaya Shoriya | Kemerovo Oblast | | |
| Nevsky | Невский | 1562 m 5,125 ft | 751 m 2,464 ft | 43.7 km 27.2 mi | 62°13′0″N 155°25′0″E | Omsukchan Range; Kolyma Mountains | Magadan Oblast | | Highest peak of the Kolyma Mountains |
| Chirip (Note: Vulkan Chirip, Russia at Peakbagger.com "Chirip". PeakVisor. "Chirippusan Chirip". Global Volcanism Program. Smithsonian Institution.) | Чирип | 1561 m 5,121 ft | 455 m 1,493 ft | 4.44 km 2.76 mi | 45°22′38″N 147°54′44″E | Chirip Peninsula; Iturup; Kuril Islands | Sakhalin Oblast | | Volcano |
| Konzhakovskiy Kamen (Note: Gora Kanzhakovskiy Kamen, Russia at Peakbagger.com) | Конжаковский Камень | 1570 m 5,151 ft | 1159 m 3,802 ft | 478 km 297 mi | 59°37′54″N 59°08′06″E | Northern Ural; Ural Mountains | Sverdlovsk Oblast | | |
| Anyuyskiy | Анюйский | 1,560 metres (5,120 ft) | | | 67°05′44″N 165°18′54″E | Anyuy Mountains; East Siberian Mountains | Chukotka Autonomous Okrug | | Volcano |
| Skalistaya (Note: Skalistaya, Russia at Peakbagger.com "Skalistaya". PeakVisor.) | Скалистая | 1548 m 5,079 ft | 1497 m 4,911 ft | 79.8 km 49.6 mi | 59°04′03″N 151°31′54″E | Koni Peninsula | Magadan Oblast | | Highest point of the Koni Peninsula |
| Krusenstern (Note: "География Новой Земли". Всё об архипелаге Новая Земля (in Russian). "Здесь же располагается наивысшая вершина архипелага, высотой 1547метров, не имеющая на картах названия, хотя, по имеемым сведениям, еще Ф. Литке присвоил ей имя Крузенштерна." Novaya Zemlya High Point, Russia at Peakbagger.com) | Крузенштерна | 1547 m 5,075 ft | 1547 m 5,075 ft | 1,077 km 669 mi | 75°10′38″N 58°26′12″E | Severny Island; Novaya Zemlya | Arkhangelsk Oblast | | Highest point of Severny Island and Novaya Zemlya |
| Roman-Kosh (Note: Roman-Kosh, Russia at Peakbagger.com "Roman Kosh". PeakVisor.) | Роман-Кош | 1545 m 5,069 ft | 1541 m 5,056 ft | 307 km 190.6 mi | 44°36′47″N 34°14′36″E | Babugan Yayla; Crimean Mountains | Republic of Crimea (Note: Not recognized internationally as a part of Russia.) | | |
| Milna (Note: Vulkan Milna, Russia at Peakbagger.com "Gora Mil'na". PeakVisor. "Milna". Global Volcanism Program. Smithsonian Institution.) | Мильна | 1539 m 5,049 ft | 1539 m 5,049 ft | 339 km 211 mi | 46°48′53″N 151°47′12″E | Simushir; Kuril Islands | Sakhalin Oblast | | Somma volcano |
| Tatarinov (Note: Vulkan Tatarinov, Russia at Peakbagger.com "Vulcan Tatarinova". PeakVisor.) | Татаринов | 1483 m 4,865 ft | 51 m 167 ft | 1.9 km 1.18 mi | 50°18′20″N 155°27′18″E | Paramushir; Kuril Islands | Sakhalin Oblast | | Volcano |
| Gora Belaya Gora | Гора Белая Гора | 1525 m 5,003 ft | 1431 m 4,695 ft | 150.6 km 93.6 mi | 52°29′37″N 137°43′24″E | | Khabarovsk Krai | | |
| Kosvinsky Kamen | Косвинский камень | 1519 m 4,984 ft | 829 m 2,720 ft | 13.5 km 8.39 mi | 59°30′58″N 59°03′41″E | Northern Ural; Ural Mountains | Sverdlovsk Oblast | | |
| Karymsky | Карымский | 1536 m 5,039 ft | 664 m 2,178 ft | 3.9 km 2.42 mi | 54°02′52″N 159°26′32″E | Kamchatka Peninsula | Kamchatka Krai | | Most active volcano on the Kamchatka Peninsula |
| Namai | Намай | 1509 m 4,951 ft | | | 55°29′58.45″N 106°42′12.64″E | Lena-Angara Plateau | Irkutsk Oblast | | Highest in the Lena-Angara Plateau |
| Payer (Note: Gora Payer, Russia at Peakbagger.com) | Пайер | 1472 m 4,829 ft | 1153 m 3,783 ft | 214 km 132.9 mi | 66°43′15″N 64°23′30″E | Polar Ural; Ural Mountains | Yamalo-Nenets Autonomous Okrug | | Highest peak of the Polar Urals |
| Ichigem Range HP | Ичигемский Высокая точка | 1465 m 4,806 ft | 626 m 2,054 ft | | 63°18′31″N 165°33′54″E | Ichigem Range, Koryak Highlands | Kamchatka Krai | | Highest in the Ichigem Range |
| Murun | Мурун | 1454 m 4,770 ft | 626 m 2,054 ft | | 58°22′32″N 118°55′30″E | Murun Massif | Sakha Republic | | Highest in the Olyokma-Chara Plateau |
| Maly Iremel | Малый Иремель | 1449 m 4,754 ft | 226 m 741 ft | 5.1 km 3.17 mi | 54°33′10″N 58°53′50″E | Southern Ural; Ural Mountains | Bashkortostan | | |
| Sarychev (Note: Pik Sarychev, Russia at Peakbagger.com "Sarychev Peak". Global Volcanism Program. Smithsonian Institution. "Sarycheva Peak". PeakVisor.) | Вулкан Сарычев | 1446 m 4,744 ft | 1446 m 4,744 ft | 177.7 km 110.4 mi | 48°05′26″N 153°12′05″E | Matua; Kuril Islands | Sakhalin Oblast | | Highest point of Matua Island |
| Mount Studencheskaya | Гора Студенческая | 1421 m 4,662 ft | 852 m 2,795 ft | | 49°15′16″N 132°18′28″E | Bureya Range | Jewish Autonomous Oblast | | Highest point of the Jewish Autonomous Oblast |
| Gora Ivao (Note: Ivao Group HP, Russia at Peakbagger.com "Ivao Group". Global Volcanism Program. Smithsonian Institution. "Gora Ivao". PeakVisor.) | Гора Ивао | 1416 m 4,646 ft | 1416 m 4,646 ft | 142.9 km 88.8 mi | 45°45′18″N 149°40′16″E | Ivao Group; Urup; Kuril Islands | Sakhalin Oblast | | Highest peak of the Ivao Group; Highest point of Urup |
| Kyrganay High Point | Кырганайский Высокая точка | 1415 m 4,642 ft | | | 67°55′N 167°0′E | Kyrganay Range; Anadyr Highlands | Chukotka Autonomous Okrug | | Highest of the Kyrganay Range |
| Bolshoy Nurgush | Большой Нургуш | 1406 m 4,613 ft | 509 m 1,670 ft | | 54°49′11″N 59°08′57″E | Nurgush; Southern Urals | Chelyabinsk Oblast | | Highest point of Chelyabinsk Oblast |
| Beshtau (Note: "Gora Beshtau". PeakVisor. Caucasus at the Encyclopædia Britannica) | Бештау | 1401 m 4,596 ft | 764 m 2,507 ft | 30 km 18.64 mi | 44°05′53″N 43°01′20″E | Pyatigorye Mountains | Stavropol Krai | | Highest peak of the Pyatigorye Mountains. |
| Prevo | Прево́ | 1381 m 4,531 ft | 1317 m 4,321 ft | 33.2 km 20.6 mi | 47°00′41″N 152°06′59″E | Simushir; Kuril Islands | Sakhalin Oblast | | |
| Karpinsky | Карпинского | 1300 m 4,265 ft | 309 m 1,014 ft | 8.6 km 5.34 mi | 50°08′52″N 155°22′22″E | Paramushir; Kuril Islands | Sakhalin Oblast | | Volcano |
| Krenitsyn | Креницын | 1325 m 4,347 ft | 1325 m 4,347 ft | 178.7 km 111 mi | 49°21′08″N 154°42′32″E | Tao-Rusyr Caldera; Onekotan; Kuril Islands | Sakhalin Oblast | | Caldera |
| Gora Zhima (Note: "Gora Zhima". PeakVisor. Gora Zhima, Russia at Peakbagger.com) | Гора Жима | 1276 m 4,186 ft | 821 m 2,694 ft | 29.3 km 18.21 mi | 53°14′13″N 107°42′41″E | Olkhon Island; Academician Ridge | Irkutsk Oblast | | |
| Kharnaurdy-Keu | Харнаурды-Кеу | 1246 m 4,088 ft | 998 m 3,274 ft | 57.6 km 35.8 mi | 67°34′27″N 65°59′12″E | Polar Ural; Ural Mountains | Yamalo-Nenets Autonomous Okrug | | |
| Gora Pallasa | Гора Палласа | 1236 m 4,055 ft | 115 m 377 ft | 3.8 km 2.36 mi | 52°07′17″N 113°01′42″E | Yablonoi Mountains | Zabaykalsky Krai | | |
| Ai-Petri | Ай-Петри | 1234 m 4,049 ft | 72 m 236 ft | 2.5 km 1.55 mi | 44°27′04″N 34°03′10″E | Crimean Mountains | Republic of Crimea | | |
| Berutarube | Берутарубе | 1223 m 4,012 ft | 1145 m 3,757 ft | 53 km 32.9 mi | 44°28′30″N 146°55′38″E | Iturup; Kuril Islands | Sakhalin Oblast | | Stratovolcano |
| Atsonupuri | Атсонупури | 1205 m 3,953 ft | 1180 m 3,871 ft | 17.7 km 11 mi | 44°48′26″N 147°07′39″E | Iturup; Kuril Islands | Sakhalin Oblast | | Stratovolcano |
| Demon | Демон | 1205 m 3,953 ft | 249 m 817 ft | 4.5 km 2.8 mi | 45°30′38″N 148°52′08″E | Iturup; Kuril Islands | Sakhalin Oblast | | Stratovolcano |
| Yudychvumchorr (Note: Gora Yudychvumchorr, Russia at Peakbagger.com "Yudichvumchorr". PeakVisor.) | Юдычвумчорр | 1191 m 3,907 ft | 1051 m 3,448 ft | 510 km 317 mi | 67°43′07″N 33°26′02″E | Khibiny Mountains; Kola Peninsula | Murmansk Oblast | | Highest point of the Khibiny Mountains |
| Dzhutsa Vtoraya | Джуца Вторая | 1196 m 3,924 ft | 296 m 971 ft | 9 km 5.59 mi | 43°55′28″N 42°59′10″E | Pyatigorye Mountains | Stavropol Krai | | Second highest peak of the Pyatigorye Mountains |
| Mount Shchuchya | гора щучья | 1185 m 3,888 ft | | | 67°37′25″N 170°08′40″E | Shchuchy Range; Anadyr Highlands | Chukotka Autonomous Okrug | | Highest of the Shchuchy Range |
| Ekarma | Экарма | 1170 m 3,839 ft | 1170 m 3,839 ft | 110 km 68.4 mi | 48°56′51″N 153°56′31″E | Ekarma; Kuril Islands | Sakhalin Oblast | | Highest point on Ekarma Island |
| Ebeko | Эбеко | 1156 m 3,793 ft | 323 m 1,060 ft | 16.1 km 10 mi | 50°41′20″N 156°00′54″E | Paramushir; Kuril Islands | Sakhalin Oblast | | Somma volcano |
| Severgin | Севергин | 1145 m 3,757 ft | 1145 m 3,757 ft | 29.3 km 18.21 mi | 49°07′05″N 154°31′10″E | Kharimkotan; Kuril Islands | Sakhalin Oblast | | Highest point of Kharimkotan |
| Kukisvumchorr (Note: Kukisvumchorr, Russia at Peakbagger.com "Gora Kukisvumchorr". PeakVisor.) | Кукисвумчорр | 1143 m 3,750 ft | 614 m 2,014 ft | 5.4 km 3.36 mi | 67°41′44″N 33°43′14″E | Khibiny Mountains; Kola Peninsula | Murmansk Oblast | | |
| Baransky | Баранский | 1134 m 3,720 ft | 802 m 2,631 ft | 11.3 km 7.02 mi | 45°06′12″N 148°00′56″E | Grozny Group; Iturup; Kuril Islands | Sakhalin Oblast | | Stratovolcano |
| Gora Chubukulakh | Гора Чубукулах | 1128 m 3,701 ft | | | 66°25′22″N 153°42′02″E | Chubukulakh Range; Yukaghir Highlands | Sakha Republic | | Highest of the Yukaghir Highlands |
| Taymyr High Point (Note: Tamyr High Point, Russia at Peakbagger.com "Высшая точка Бырранга". Wikimapia (in Russian).) | Таймыр Высокая точка | 1125 m 3,691 ft | 727 m 2,385 ft | 754 km 469 mi | 75°21′40″N 110°36′48″E | Byrranga Mountains; Taymyr Peninsula | Krasnoyarsk Krai | | Highest peak of the Byrranga Mountains; Highest point of the Taymyr Peninsula |
| Medvezhya | Медве́жий | 1124 m 3,688 ft | 848 m 2,782 ft | 12.6 km 7.83 mi | 45°23′13″N 148°50′35″E | Iturup; Kuril Islands | Sakhalin Oblast | | Complex volcano |
| Angvundaschorr (Note: Gora Angvundaschorr, Russia at Peakbagger.com "Gora Angvundaschorr". PeakVisor.) | Ангвундасчорр | 1121 m 3,678 ft | 167 m 548 ft | 2.7 km 1.68 mi | 67°49′52″N 34°31′40″E | Lovozero Massif; Kola Peninsula | Murmansk Oblast | | |
| Oslyanka | Ослянка | 1117 m 3,665 ft | 650 m 2,133 ft | 46.8 km 29.1 mi | 59°09′49″N 58°33′06″E | Basegi Range; Middle Ural; Ural Mountains | Perm Krai | | Highest point of the Middle Ural |
| Medvezhy Logovo | Гора Медвежье Логово | 1105 m 3,625 ft | | | 69°51′31″N 171°16′34″E | Shelag Range; Chukotka Mountains | Chukotka Autonomous Okrug | | Highest peak of the Shelag Range |
| Yenashimskiy Polkan (Note: Gora Yenashimskiy Polkan, Russia at Peakbagger.com "Gora Yenashimskiy Polkan". PeakVisor.) | Енашимский Полкан | 1104 m 3,622 ft | 801 m 2,628 ft | 535 km 332 mi | 59°49′30″N 92°51′15″E | Yenisey Range; Central Siberian Plateau | Krasnoyarsk Krai | | Highest peak of Yenisey Range |
| Holatchahl | Холатчахль | 1097 m 3,599 ft | 234 m 768 ft | 12.7 km 7.89 mi | 61°45′18″N 59°25′21″E | Ural Mountains | Komi Republic; Sverdlovsk Oblast | | Dyatlov Pass incident |
| Gora Sovetskaya | Советская Гора | 1096 m 3,596 ft | 1096 m 3,596 ft | | 71°05′49″N 179°21′24″W | Wrangel Island | Chukotka Autonomous Okrug | | Highest point in Wrangel Island |
| Ymiysky Range HP | Ымыйский кряж Высокая точка | 1,045 metres (3,428 ft) | | | 68°31′30″N 137°14′40″E | Ymiysky Range, Chersky Range | Sakha Republic | | Highest peak of the Ymiysky Range |
| Nakson | Наксон | 1,035 metres (3,396 ft) | | | 65°46′0″N 95°37′0″E | Syverma, Central Siberian Plateau | Krasnoyarsk Krai | | Highest peak of the Syverma Plateau |
| Nemo | Немо | 1018 m 3,340 ft | 873 m 2,864 ft | 24.9 km 15.47 mi | 49°33′49″N 154°48′51″E | Onekotan; Kuril Islands | Sakhalin Oblast | | Stratovolcano |

=== Under 1000 meters ===
| Peak | Russian name | Elevation | Prominence | Isolation | Coordinates | Range or Landform | Federal subject | Image | Notes |
|---|---|---|---|---|---|---|---|---|---|
| Zmeyka | Змейка | 994 m 3,261 ft | 540 m 1,772 ft | 8.4 km 5.22 mi | 44°10′05″N 43°05′39″E | Pyatigorye Mountains | Stavropol Krai | | |
| Balagan-Tas | Балаган-Тас | 993 m 3,258 ft | 148 m 486 ft | 2.2 km 1.37 mi | 65°57′30″N 145°53′35″E | Chersky Range; East Siberian Mountains | Yakutia | | Cinder cone |
| Mashuk (Note: "МАШУ́К" [MASHUK]. Great Russian Encyclopedia (in Russian). Vol. 19. Moscow. 2011. p. 434. "Выс. до 993 м." "Mashuk". PeakVisor.) | Машук | 994 m 3,261 ft | 399 m 1,309 ft | 5.9 km 3.67 mi | 44°03′01″N 43°05′18″E | Pyatigorye Mountains | Stavropol Krai | | |
| Dzhutsa Pervaya | Джуца Первая | 972 m 3,189 ft | 282 m 925 ft | 5.3 km 3.29 mi | 43°58′12″N 43°01′20″E | Pyatigorye Mountains | Stavropol Krai | | |
| Gebek-Kala | Гебек-кала | 971 metres (3,186 ft) | | | 43°05′02″N 46°36′42″E | Greater Caucasus | Dagestan | | |
| Karpinskiy (Note: October Revolution High Point, Russia at Peakbagger.com) | Карпинский | 965 m 3,166 ft | 965 m 3,166 ft | 451 km 280 mi | 79°35′20″N 99°06′03″E | October Revolution Island; Severnaya Zemlya | Krasnoyarsk Krai | | Ice cap Highest point on October Revolution Island and Severnaya Zemlya |
| Razvalka | Развалка | 918 m 3,012 ft | 319 m 1,047 ft | 4.6 km 2.86 mi | 44°09′13″N 43°01′58″E | Pyatigorye Mountains | Stavropol Krai | | |
| Titovskaya Sopka | Титовская сопка | 907 m 2,976 ft | 251 m 823 ft | 6.6 km 4.1 mi | 52°00′59″N 113°27′32″E | Chersky Range | Zabaykalsky Krai | | Stratovolcano |
| Pochepsukha | Почепсуха | 903 m 2,963 ft | 463 m 1,519 ft | 12.8 km 7.95 mi | 44°21′48″N 39°02′22″E | Greater Caucasus | Krasnodar Krai | | |
| Kyllakh High Point | Кыллахский Высокая точка | 901 m 2,956 ft | | | 61°16′15″N 135°38′22″E | Kyllakh Range; Verkhoyansk Range | Sakha Republic | | Highest of the Kyllakh Range |
| Mendeleyeva | Менделе́ева | 883 m 2,897 ft | 859 m 2,818 ft | 44.4 km 27.6 mi | 43°58′35″N 145°44′10″E | Kunashir Island; Kuril Islands | Sakhalin Oblast | | Stratovolcano |
| Verblyud | Верблюд | 883 m 2,897 ft | 364 m 1,194 ft | 12.6 km 7.83 mi | 44°11′53″N 42°53′15″E | Pyatigorye Mountains | Stavropol Krai | | |
| Zolotoy Kurgan | Золотой Курган | 884 m 2,900 ft | 187 m 614 ft | 7.1 km 4.41 mi | 43°56′33″N 43°06′39″E | Pyatigorye Mountains | Stavropol Krai | | |
| Ostraya | Острая | 876 m 2,874 ft | 78 m 256 ft | 1.2 km 0.75 mi | 44°07′07″N 42°59′51″E | Pyatigorye Mountains | Stavropol Krai | | |
| Sheludivaya | Шелудивая | 872 m 2,861 ft | 197 m 646 ft | 2.8 km 1.74 mi | 44°05′41″N 42°58′14″E | Pyatigorye Mountains | Stavropol Krai | | |
| Zheleznaya | Железная | 858 m 2,815 ft | 227 m 745 ft | 1.5 km 0.93 mi | 44°08′21″N 43°01′49″E | Pyatigorye Mountains | Stavropol Krai | | |
| Gora Severnyy Nunatak | Гора Северный Нунатак | 821 metres (2,694 ft) | | | 76°36′35″N 66°20′22″E | Severny Island; Novaya Zemlya | Arkhangelsk Oblast | | |
| Byk | Бык | 812 m 2,664 ft | 332 m 1,089 ft | 5.9 km 3.67 mi | 44°11′04″N 42°57′40″E | Pyatigorye Mountains | Stavropol Krai | | |
| Kabanka | Кабанка | 770 m 2,526 ft | 37 m 121 ft | 0.41 km 0.25 mi | 44°07′25″N 43°00′11″E | Pyatigorye Mountains | Stavropol Krai | | |
| Lysaya | Лысая | 739 m 2,425 ft | 258 m 846 ft | 10.2 km 6.34 mi | 44°05′53″N 43°12′46″E | Pyatigorye Mountains | Stavropol Krai | | |
| Medovaya | Медовая | 721 m 2,365 ft | 100 m 328 ft | 1.2 km 0.75 mi | 44°08′06″N 43°00′32″E | Pyatigorye Mountains | Stavropol Krai | | |
| Marchekanskaya Sopka | Марчеканская сопка | 694 m 2,277 ft | 625 m 2,051 ft | 17.9 km 11.12 mi | 59°30′34″N 150°49′27″E | Staritsky Peninsula | Magadan Oblast | | Highest point of the Staritsky Peninsula |
| Nakas | Накас | 668 m 2,192 ft | 364 m 1,194 ft | 23.3 km 14.48 mi | 52°32′41″N 56°15′27″E | Southern Urals | Orenburg Oblast | | Highest point of Orenburg Oblast |
| Daur | Даур | 666 m 2,185 ft | 556 m 1,824 ft | 30.6 km 19.01 mi | 48°03′23″N 132°08′44″E | Central Amur Lowland | Jewish Autonomous Oblast | | |
| Akhun (Note: Mount Bolshoy Akhun, Russia at Peakbagger.com) | Ахун | 662 m 2,172 ft | 232 m 761 ft | 4.91 km 3.05 mi | 43°33′02″N 39°50′36″E | Greater Caucasus | Krasnodar Krai | | |
| Nuorunen | Нуорунен | 578 m 1,896 ft | 330 m 1,083 ft | 65.6 km 40.8 mi | 66°08′41″N 30°14′41″E | Maanselkä | Republic of Karelia | | |
| Ayu-Dag | Аю-Даг | 579 m 1,900 ft | 356 m 1,168 ft | 3.5 km 2.17 mi | 44°33′37″N 34°19′40″E | Crimean Mountains | Republic of Crimea | | |
| Shize | Шизе | 549 m 1,801 ft | 334 m 1,096 ft | 7.1 km 4.41 mi | 44°44′22″N 38°09′16″E | Gruzinka Ridge; Greater Caucasus | Krasnodar Krai | | Highest peak of Gruzinka Ridge |
| Golovnin | Головнин | 543 m 1,781 ft | 536 m 1,759 ft | 21.7 km 13.48 mi | 43°50′35″N 145°30′20″E | Kunashir Island; Kuril Islands | Sakhalin Oblast | | Caldera; Southernmost volcano of the Kuril Islands |
| Chekanovsky Ridge High Point | Чекановского Высокая точка | 539 m 1,768 ft | | | 72°41′55″N 123°13′15″E | Chekanovsky Ridge | Sakha Republic | | Highest of the Chekanovsky Ridge |
| Sieppitunturi | Сиэппитунтури | 538 m 1,765 ft | 263 m 863 ft | 28.3 km 17.58 mi | 66°28′24″N 29°58′07″E | | Republic of Karelia | | Fell |
| Korvatunturi | Корватунтури | 484 m 1,588 ft | 212 m 696 ft | 16.5 km 10.25 mi | 68°04′25″N 29°18′55″E | | Murmansk Oblast (Note: On the border between Finland and Russia) | | Fell |
| Chetlasskiy Kamen (Note: Vozvish Chetlasskiy, Russia at Peakbagger.com "Gora Chetlasskiy Kamen'". PeakVisor.) | Четласский Камень | 471 m 1,545 ft | 360 m 1,181 ft | 388 km 241 mi | 64°36′06″N 50°20′48″E | Timan Ridge | Komi Republic | | Highest point of the Timen Ridge |
| Vargina | Варгина | 459 m 1,506 ft | 434 m 1,424 ft | 36 km 22.4 mi | 43°09′30″N 132°01′04″E | Muravyov-Amursky Peninsula; Sikhote-Alin | Primorsky Krai | | |
| De Long (Note: Mount De Long, Russia at Peakbagger.com "Mount De Long". PeakVisor.) | Де-Ло́нга | 426 m 1,398 ft | 426 m 1,398 ft | 481 km 299 mi | 76°39′08″N 148°35′17″E | Bennett Island; De Long Islands; New Siberian Islands | Yakutia | | Highest point of Bennett Island and the De Long Islands |
| Mount Vottovaara (Note: North Karelian Highland High Point, Russia at Peakbagger.com "Vottovaara". PeakVisor.) | Воттоваара | 417 m 1,368 ft | 245 m 804 ft | 332 km 206 mi | 63°04′24″N 32°37′27″E | West Karelian Upland | Republic of Karelia | | Highest point of the West Karelian Upland |
| Kinzhal | Кинжал | 413 m 1,355 ft | 78 m 256 ft | 5.4 km 3.36 mi | 44°16′15″N 43°00′59″E | Pyatigorye Mountains | Stavropol Krai | | |
| Toratau | Тратау | 406 m 1,332 ft | 189 m 620 ft | 25.3 km 15.72 mi | 53°33′16″N 56°05′56″E | Southern Ural; Ural Mountains | Bashkortostan | | Shihan |
| Kokurtly | Кокуртлы | 404 m 1,325 ft | 50 m 164 ft | 1.9 km 1.18 mi | 44°17′01″N 43°02′11″E | Pyatigorye Mountains | Stavropol Krai | | |
| Kushtau | Куштау | 376 m 1,234 ft | 180 m 591 ft | 15.4 km 9.57 mi | 53°42′06″N 56°05′04″E | Southern Ural; Ural Mountains | Bashkortostan | | Shihan |
| Khvalynsk Mountains | Хвалынские горы | 380 m 1,247 ft | 261 m 856 ft | 429 km 266 mi | 52°28′59″N 48°01′50″E | Volga Upland | Saratov Oblast | | Highest point of Saratov Oblast |
| Malakatyn-Tas | Малакатын-Тас | 362 m 1,188 ft | 362 m 1,188 ft | 332 km 207 mi | 74°52′15″N 138°45′28″E | Kotelny Island; Anzhu Islands; New Siberian Islands | Yakutia | | Highest point of the Anzhu Islands |
| Yuraktau | Юрактау | 339 m 1,112 ft | 214 m 702 ft | 5 km 3.11 mi | 53°44′30″N 56°05′51″E | Southern Ural; Ural Mountains | Bashkortostan | | Shihan |
| Lobno | Лобно | 336 m 1,102 ft | 182 m 597 ft | 315 km 195.7 mi | 56°50′53″N 29°24′27″E | Bezhanitskaya Upland | Pskov Oblast | | |
| Verblyuzhka | Верблюжка | 327 m 1,073 ft | 173 m 568 ft | 9.9 km 6.15 mi | 51°23′14″N 56°48′43″E | | Orenburg Oblast | | |
| Kisilyakh-Tas | Кисилях-Тас | 327 metres (1,073 ft) | | | 69°41′47″N 154°58′47″E | Kolyma Lowland | Yakutia | | Kigilyakh |
| Chatyr-Tau | Кисилях-Тас | 320 m 1,050 ft | 82 m 269 ft | 44.3 km 27.5 mi | 54°53′40″N 53°11′29″E | Bugulma-Belebey Upland | Tatarstan | | |
| Zamri-Gora | Замри-гора | 309 m 1,014 ft | 146 m 479 ft | 406 km 252 mi | 55°29′20″N 35°29′25″E | Moscow Uplands; Smolensk–Moscow Upland | Moscow Oblast | | Highest point in Moscow Oblast |
| Malgora | Мальгора | 304 m 997 ft | 141 m 463 ft | | 60°40′41″N 35°22′43″E | Vepsian Upland | Vologda Oblast | | Highest point of the Vepsian Upland |
| Bolshoi Kovruga | Большая Коврига | 302 m 991 ft | 191 m 627 ft | 203 km 126.2 mi | 67°05′54″N 48°56′45″E | | Nenets Autonomous Okrug; Arkhangelsk Oblast | | |
| Isakova Gora | Исакова гора | 293 m 961 ft | 155 m 509 ft | 470 km 292 mi | 59°50′03″N 44°36′42″E | Northern Ridge | Vologda Oblast | | Highest point in the Northern Ridge |
| Gapselga | Гапсельга | 291 m 955 ft | | | 60°28′43″N 35°10′22″E | Vepsian Upland | Leningrad Oblast | | Highest point in Leningrad Oblast |
| Tarkhov Kholm | Тархов холм | 291 m 955 ft | 132 m 433 ft | 131.6 km 81.8 mi | 57°05′30″N 38°35′40″E | | Yaroslavl Oblast | | |
| Sirkaltotporelsek (Note: "p-43 44 Map" (JPG) (in Russian). 1987. Sirkaltotporelsek, Russia at Peakbagger.com) | Сибирские Увалы Высокая точка | 278 m 912 ft | 147 m 482 ft | 301 km 186.9 mi | 63°18′48″N 82°18′33″E | Siberian Uvaly | Yamalo-Nenets Autonomous Okrug | | Highest hill of the Siberian Uvaly |
| Shatrinskaya Gora | Шатринская гора | 275 m 902 ft | 58 m 190 ft | 41.9 km 26 mi | 54°58′41″N 35°16′19″E | | Kaluga Oblast | | |
| Mogutova Gora | Могутова гора | 271 m 889 ft | 189 m 620 ft | 3.6 km 2.24 mi | 53°25′24″N 49°30′14″E | Zhiguli Mountains | Samara Oblast | | |
| Kholodilnik | Замри-гора | 258 m 846 ft | 112 m 367 ft | 3.2 km 1.99 mi | 43°08′43″N 131°56′24″E | Muravyov-Amursky Peninsula; Sikhote-Alin | Primorsky Krai | | Highest point in Vladivostok |
| Molodetskiy Kurgan | Молодецкий курган | 241 m 791 ft | 43 m 141 ft | 7.3 km 4.54 mi | 53°24′03″N 49°18′11″E | Zhiguli Mountains | Samara Oblast | | |
| Chekeril | Чекерил | 235 m 771 ft | 94 m 308 ft | 7.4 km 4.6 mi | 56°47′35″N 53°03′32″E | | Udmurtia | | |
| Shared | Шаред | 220 m 722 ft | 137 m 449 ft | 48.8 km 30.3 mi | 45°38′41″N 44°34′37″E | Yergeni | Kalmykia | | Highest point in Kamlykia |
| Gasforta | Гасфорта | 218 m 715 ft | 87 m 285 ft | 1.8 km 1.12 mi | 44°31′59″N 33°40′03″E | Crimean Mountains | Sevastopol | | |
| Opuk | Опук | 182 m 597 ft | 123 m 404 ft | 33.3 km 20.7 mi | 45°02′15″N 36°13′25″E | Cape Opuk; Kerch Peninsula | Republic of Crimea | | Highest point of Cape Opuk |
| Orekhovaya Gora | Ореховая гора | 175 m 574 ft | 75 m 246 ft | 49.2 km 30.5 mi | 59°41′52″N 30°08′01″E | Duderhof Heights; Izhora Plateau | Saint Petersburg | | Highest point in Saint Petersburg |
| Bolshoy Bogdo (Note: "БОГДО́ БОЛЬШО́Е" [BOGDÓ BOLSHÓE]. Great Russian Encyclopedia (in Russian). Vol. 3. Moscow. 2005. p. 434. "Выс. 149 м." "Gora Bol'shoye Bogdo". PeakVisor.) | Большое Богдо | 149 m 489 ft | 131 m 430 ft | 228 km 141.5 mi | 48°08′33″N 46°51′21″E | Caspian Depression | Astrakhan Oblast | | Highest point in Astrakhan Oblast; Highest point of the Caspian Depression |
| Mamayev Kurgan | Мамаев курган | 123 m 404 ft | 42 m 138 ft | 10.6 km 6.59 mi | 48°44′32″N 44°32′13″E | | Volgograd Oblast | | Kurgan |
| Galtgarben Hill | Гальтгарбен | 108 m 354 ft | 106 m 348 ft | 39.1 km 24.3 mi | 54°48′26″N 20°14′11″E | Sambia Upland; Sambia Peninsula | Kaliningrad Oblast | | Highest peak of the Sambia Upland |

== See also ==
- Highest points of Russian Federal subjects
- List of Altai mountains
- List of mountains in Mongolia
- List of mountains in China
- List of ultras of Northeast Asia
- List of volcanoes in Russia
- List of lakes of Russia
