= Mishrigi =

Mountain in Russia

- Mishrigi-Tau
- Location within Russia

Highest point
- Elevation: 5,019 m (16,467 ft)
- Prominence: 219 m (719 ft)
- Coordinates: 43°2′39″N 43°8′56″E

Geography
- Location: Russia
- Republic: Kabardino-Balkaria
- Parent range: Caucasus

Climbing
- First ascent: 1889, by Hermann Woolley
- Easiest route: Rock/snow/ice climb (Russian Grade 4B)

Mishrigi or Mishrigi-Tau (Russian: Мижирги) is the seventh highest mountain in Russia. (Note: It is considered a sub-peak of Pik Pushkina (which is also a sub-peak itself) due to its low prominence of 219 m (719 ft) and not an independent mountain.) The height of the western peak of Mishrigi reaches 5,018.7 m (16,466 ft), and the eastern one reaches 4,924 m (16,155 ft). It is located in the Bezengi Wall, which is part of the Northern Caucasus Mountains.

According to one version, it is named after the Balkarian shepherd Mazhir Attaev from the village of Bezengi, who, according to unconfirmed reports, climbed to the top of the mountain in the middle of the 19th century. The first official ascent of the summit was made by Hermann Woolley in 1889. The first ascent of the western summit on the southern ridge in 1934 was made by Swiss climbers Lorenz Saladin, Hans Graf and Walter Frey.

Mishrigi is included in the list of ten peaks of the Russian Federation for awarding the title of "Snow Leopard of Russia", which is the award given to people who have climbed up the ten highest peaks of Russia.

== See also ==
- List of mountains and hills of Russia
