= Kharatas ridge =

Mountains in Russia

Kharatas
- Location within Russia
- Outline Map of Khakasia.svg

Highest point
- Elevation: 2,211 m (7,254 ft)
- Coordinates: 53°55′30″N 89°23′28″E

Geography
- Parent range: Kuznetsk Alatau

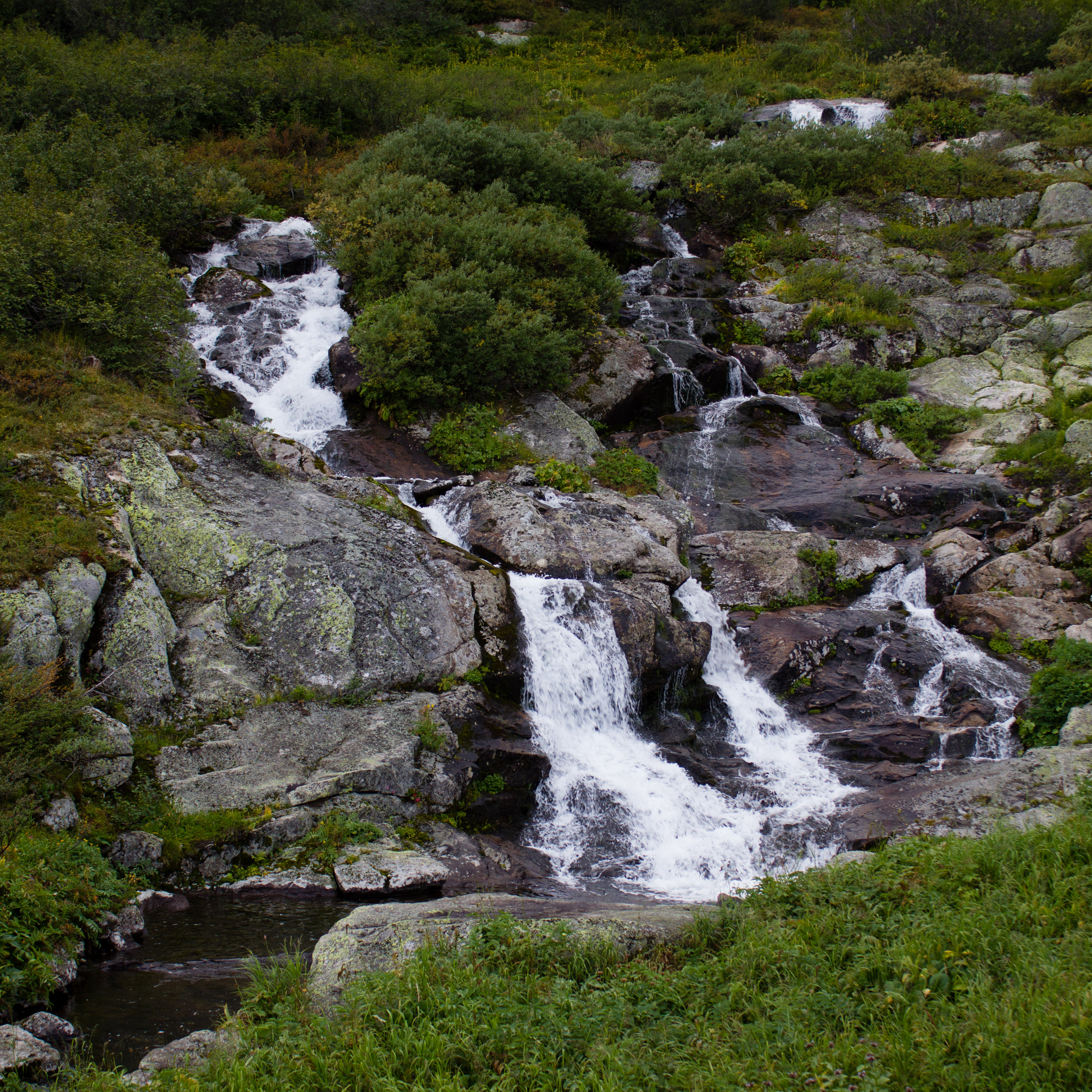
Waterfall on Lake Kharatas

Kharatas is a mountain range in the Kuznetsk Alatau in the western part of the Ust-Abakansky district of the Republic of Khakassia.

The name is derived from the common Turkic kara (black) and Shor tas (naked).

The second order short mountain range adjoins the main ridge spurs of Kuznetsk Alatau. The length is 35 km (22 mi) from the southwest to the northeast. Kharatas branches off from the main ridge of the Kuznetsk Alatau in the region of Mount Verkhny Zub 2,178 m (7,146 ft) and is the watershed of the Kharatas and Bely Iyus rivers. Absolute heights increase from north to south, from 1,200 m (3,900 ft) to 2,211 m (7,254 ft) (mountain Staraya Krepost). The southern section is represented by peneplanated dissected highlands 1,700 m (5,600 ft)–2,000 m (6,600 ft) dominated by tundra landscapes and fragments of subalpine meadows and light forests on tundra peaty and mountain meadow soils. The middle section 1,400 m (4,600 ft)–1,700 m (5,600 ft) is a steeply sloping middle mountain, deeply dissected, with dark coniferous forests. The northern part 800 m (2,600 ft)–1,400 m (4,600 ft) is a steeply sloping, strongly and moderately dissected, ridged, peneplainized lowland, with cedar-fir-spruce and pine-larch forests on the slopes. Kurums of the Kuznetsk Alatau cover the Karatas ridges.

Popular destination for mountaineering, rock climbing, mountain tourism

== Peaks ==
| Name | Height | Category |
|---|---|---|
| Malaya Kayda | 1,415 m (4,642 ft) | |
| Malaya Khayba | 1,440 m (4,720 ft) | |
| Kharatag | 1,258 m (4,127 ft) | |
| Bol'shaya Khayba | 1,752 m (5,748 ft) | |
| Molniya | 2,137 m (7,011 ft) | n/c |
| Sovetskoy Khakasii | 2,209 m (7,247 ft) | |
| Staraya Krepost' | 2,217 m (7,274 ft) | n/c |
| Festival'nyy | 1,564.7 m (5,134 ft) | |
| Forpost | 1,564.7 m (5,134 ft) | |
| Nadezhda | 2,020 m (6,630 ft) | |
| Verkhny Zub | 2,178 m (7,146 ft) | |

== Passes ==
| Name | Height | What connects |
|---|---|---|
| Chalbah Kazan | | Sovetskoy Khakasii to Molniya |
| Malay | | Sovetskoy Khakasii to Molniya |
| Vysokiy | | Sovetskoy Khakasii to Molniya |
| Skrytyy | 2,209 m (7,247 ft) | Sovetskoy Khakasii to Molniya |
| Tyagun | | |
| Shirokiy | | |
| Krayniy | | |
| Lozhnyye vorota | | |
| Koz'i Vorota | 1,806 m (5,925 ft) | r. Turalyg - lake Karatash |
| Vysokiy | 2,000 m (6,600 ft) | r. Turalyg - r. Shirokaya Berozovaya |

== Lakes ==
| Name | Height |
|---|---|
| Ying Yang | 2,000 m (6,600 ft) |
| Kharatas | 1,400 m (4,600 ft) |

== See also ==
- Kuznetsk Alatau
- Kuznetsk Alatau Nature Reserve
- Podnebesnyye Zub'ya
- Ridge Tigirtish

== Literature ==
- Encyclopedia of the Republic of Khakassia: [in 2 volumes] / Government of the Rep. Khakassia; [scientific-ed. council: V. A. Kuzmin (prev.) and others]. - Abakan: Polikor, 2007. Vol. 1: [A - H]. - 2007. - 430, [2] p. : ill., portr. — Bibliographer. at the end of words. Art. - S. 252–253.
