= Mount Chyon =

Mountain in Russia

Mount Chyon Гора Чён
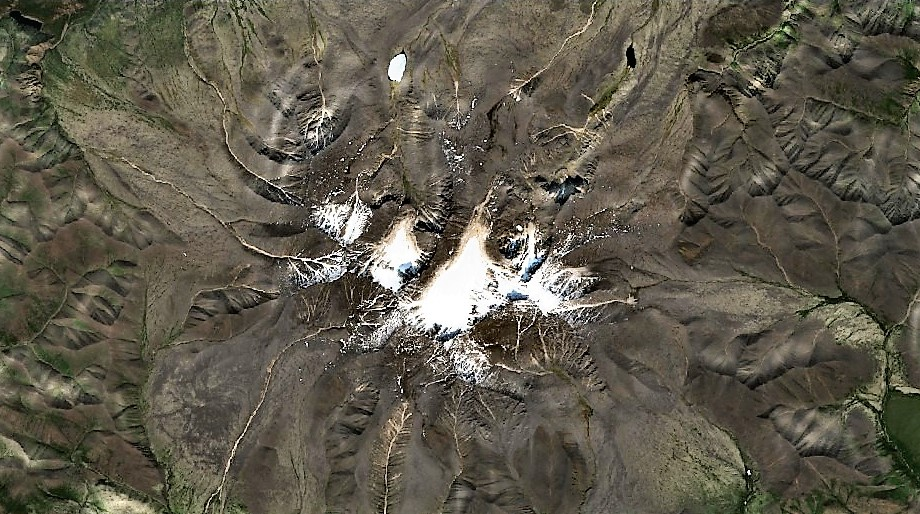
- Mt Chyon Sentinel-2 image

Highest point
- Elevation: 2,690 m (8,830 ft)
- Prominence: 1,740 m (5,710 ft)
- Coordinates: 65°17′03″N 141°48′10″E

Geography
- Location within Sakha Republic
- Location: Sakha Republic, Russia
- Parent range: Silyap Range; Chersky Range

Geology
- Mountain type: Ultra

Climbing
- Easiest route: From Ust-Nera

Mount Chyon (Russian: Гора Чён, romanized: Gora Chyon), also known as "Gora Chen", is a mountain in the Sakha Republic (Yakutia), Russia. At 2,690 m (8,830 ft) it is the highest summit in the Silyap Range, part of the central Chersky Range, East Siberian System.

An ultra-prominent peak, it rises in a desolate area about 80 kilometres (50 mi) west of the Indigirka.

The nearest airport is Ust-Nera Airport.

== See also ==
- List of mountains and hills of Russia
- List of ultras of Northeast Asia
