= Kropotkin Range (Eastern Sayan) =

Mountain range in Siberia

Kropotkin Range Хребет Кропоткина
- Location within Republic of Buryatia

Highest point
- Peak: Khoyto-Ula
- Elevation: 3,149 m (10,331 ft)
- Coordinates: 52°51′N 99°42′E

Dimensions
- Length: 120 km (75 mi) SW / NE
- Width: 40 km (25 mi)

Geography
- Country: Russia
- Federal subject: Buryatia
- Range coordinates: 52°55′N 99°45′E
- Parent range: Eastern Sayan; South Siberian System

Geology
- Orogeny: Alpine orogeny

Kropotkin Range (Russian: Хребет Кропоткина) is a mountain range in Okinsky District, Buryatia, Russian Federation.

== Geography ==
The Kropotkin Range is part of the Eastern Sayan mountains. It rises at the western end of Buryatia, to the northwest of the Oka river, stretching roughly for about 120 kilometres (75 mi) in a SW to NE direction. The Khoyto-Oka tributary of the Oka separates this range from the Oka Range (Окинский хребет) to the west and north. To the eastern side of the river rise the Belskye Goltsy (Бельские Гольцы). The confluence of the Khoyto-Oka and the Oka marks the northeastern limit of the range.

The mountains display an Alpine relief. The highest summit is 3,149 metres (10,331 ft) high Khoyto-Ula.

== See also ==
- List of mountains and hills of Russia
