= Oka (Angara) =

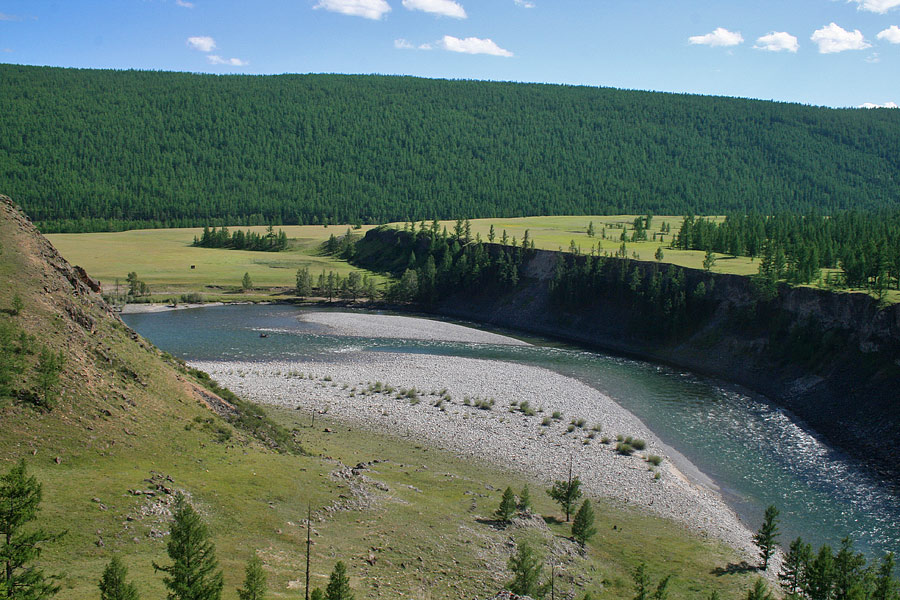

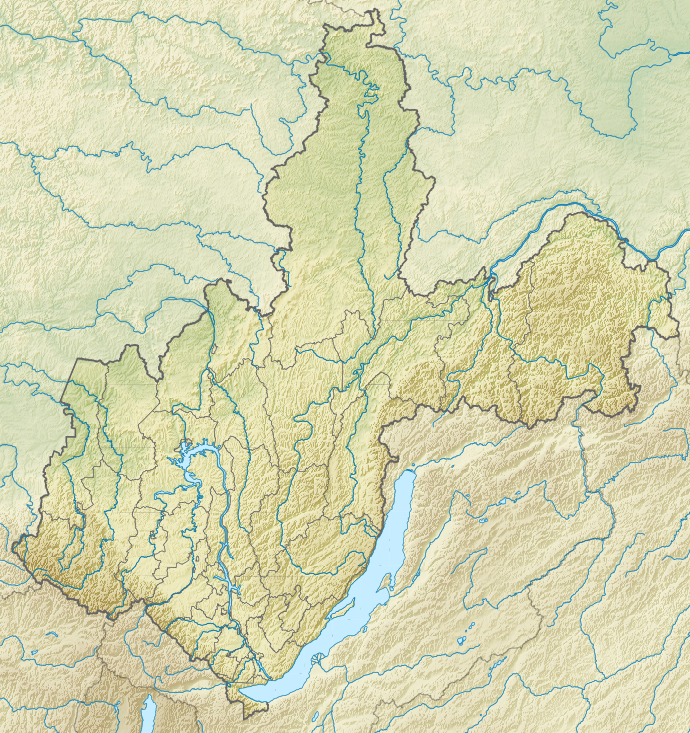
- Mouth location in Irkutsk Oblast, Russia

Location
- Country: Russia

Physical characteristics
- Source
  - location: Oka Plateau, Sayan Mountains
- Mouth: Angara
  - location: Bratsk Reservoir
  - coordinates: 55°30′55″N 102°20′54″E
- Length: 630 km (390 mi)
- Basin size: 34,000 km^{2} (13,000 sq mi)

Basin features
- Progression: Angara→ Yenisey→ Kara Sea

The Oka (Russian: Ока, Buryat: Аха, romanized: Akha) is a river in Siberia, left tributary of the Angara. It is 630 kilometres (390 mi) long, and has a drainage basin of 34,000 square kilometres (13,000 sq mi).

== Course ==
It originates in the Oka Lake, Oka Plateau, Sayan Mountains at the western end of Buryatia. It flows roughly northwestwards with the Bolshoy Sayan to the southwest. After it bends northeastwards the river flows between the Kropotkin Range and the Belskye Goltsy (Бельские Гольцы). After the Khoyto-Oka tributary joins it from the left it enters Irkutsk Oblast and flows in a roughly more northern direction. Finally the Oka discharges into the Bratsk reservoir.

== See also ==
- List of rivers of Russia
