= Silyap Range =

Mountain range in Russia

- Силяпский хребет / Силэп
- Location within Sakha Republic

Highest point
- Peak: Mount Chyon
- Elevation: 2,690 m (8,830 ft)

Dimensions
- Length: 100 km (62 mi) W/E
- Width: 30 km (19 mi) N/S

Geography
- Country: Russia
- Federal subject: Sakha Republic
- Range coordinates: 65°15′N 141°45′E
- Parent range: Chersky Range, East Siberian System

Climbing
- Easiest route: From Ust-Nera

The Silyap Range (Russian: Силяпский хребет; Yakut: Силэп) is a mountain range in the Sakha Republic (Yakutia), Far Eastern Federal District, Russia. The nearest city is Ust-Nera.

== Geography ==
The Silyap Range rises in the central area of the Chersky Range, to the west of the upper course of the Indigirka. Although the range is one of the smallest of the system, it has some of the most massive mountains of the range. The Silyap Range stretches in a roughly west–east direction for about 100 kilometers (62 mi). The highest peak is 2,690 metres (8,830 ft) high Mount Chyon (Гора Чён), also known as "Gora Chen", an ultra-prominent peak.

The larger Borong Range, another subrange of the Chersky Mountains, rises to the northwest, and the Porozhny Range to the north. The northern end of the Tas-Kystabyt rises roughly 70 km to the south of the range.

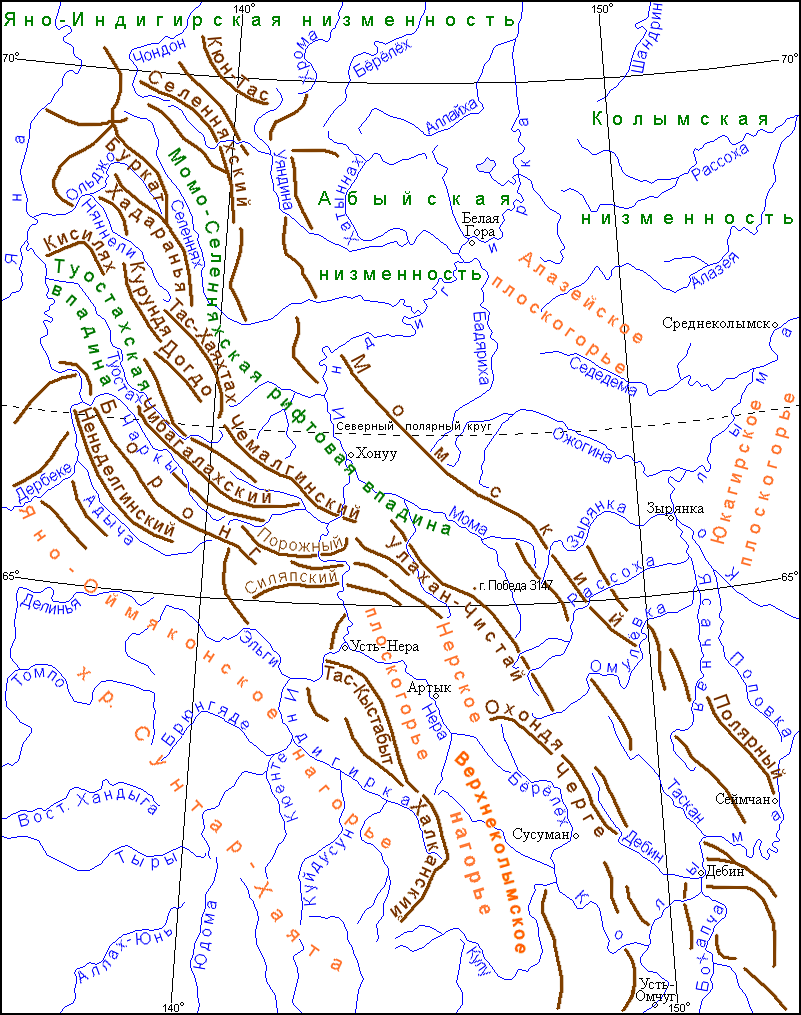
Schematic map of the Chersky System, with the Silyap range roughly in the center.

== See also ==
- List of mountains and hills of Russia
- List of ultras of Northeast Asia
