= Angvundaschorr =

Mountain in Murmansk Oblast, Russia

- Ангвундасчорр
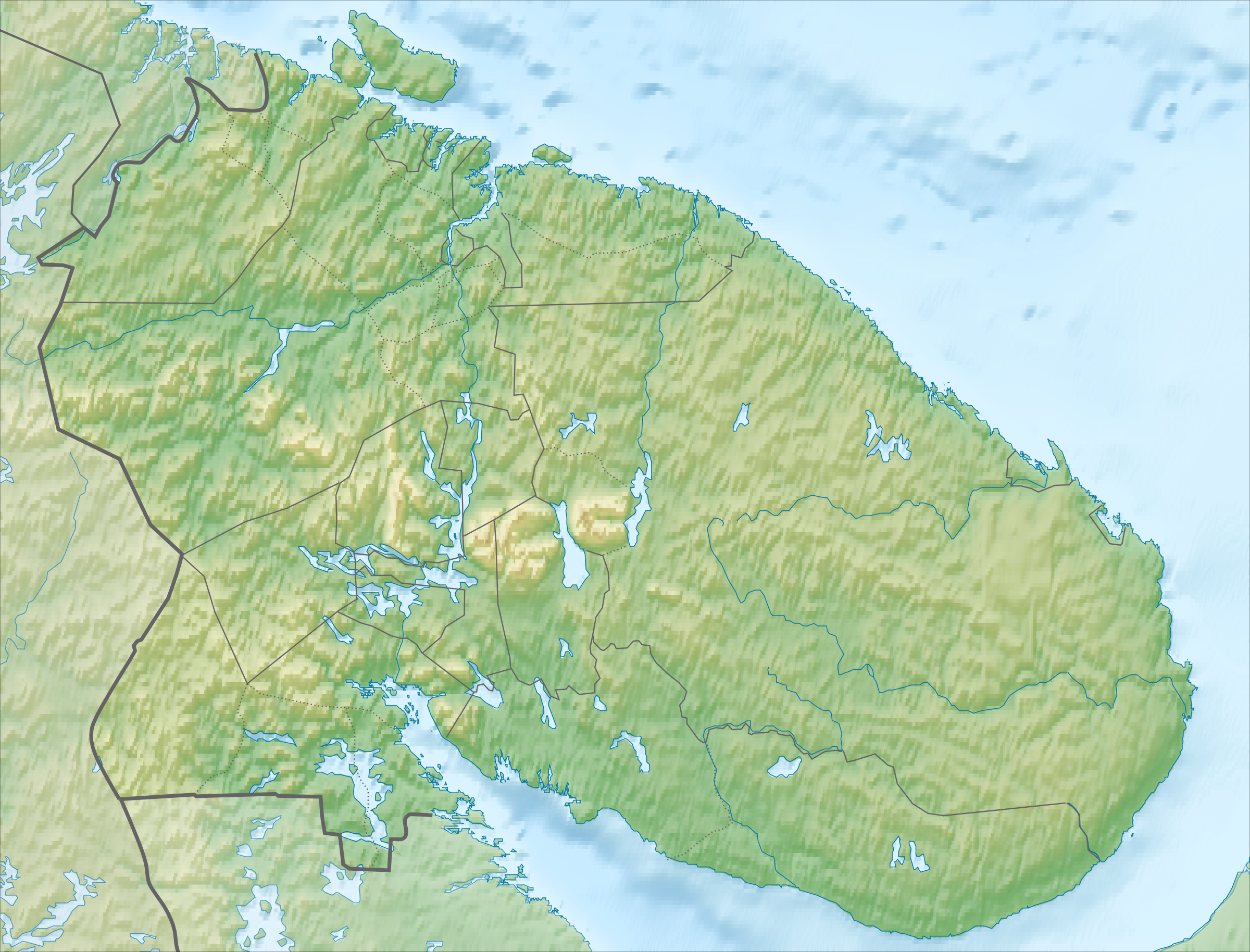
- Location within Murmansk Oblast

Highest point
- Elevation: 1,120 m (3,670 ft)
- Prominence: 167 m (548 ft)
- Coordinates: 67°49′52″N 34°31′40″E

Geography
- Location: Murmansk Oblast, Russia
- Parent range: Lovozero Massif

Angvundaschorr (Russian: Ангвундасчорр), is a mountain massif in the Kola Peninsula, Russia. It is located in the Lovozero Massif. 1,120 metres (3,670 ft) high Mount Angvundaschorr is the highest point. The name means "mountain with sandy slopes" in the Saami language.

The Angvundaschorr Pass between Angvundaschorr and Kedykvampakhk (Кедыкварпахк) peaks connects the valleys of the brooks Chinglusuai and Sengisyok.

The mountain is a tourist attraction because of its legend according to which Angvundaschorr bears an imprint of the killed warlock Kuyva and thus the mountain is considered to be forbidding for the rock-climbers.

== See also ==
- List of mountains and hills of Russia
