= Belalakaya =

Mountain in Russia

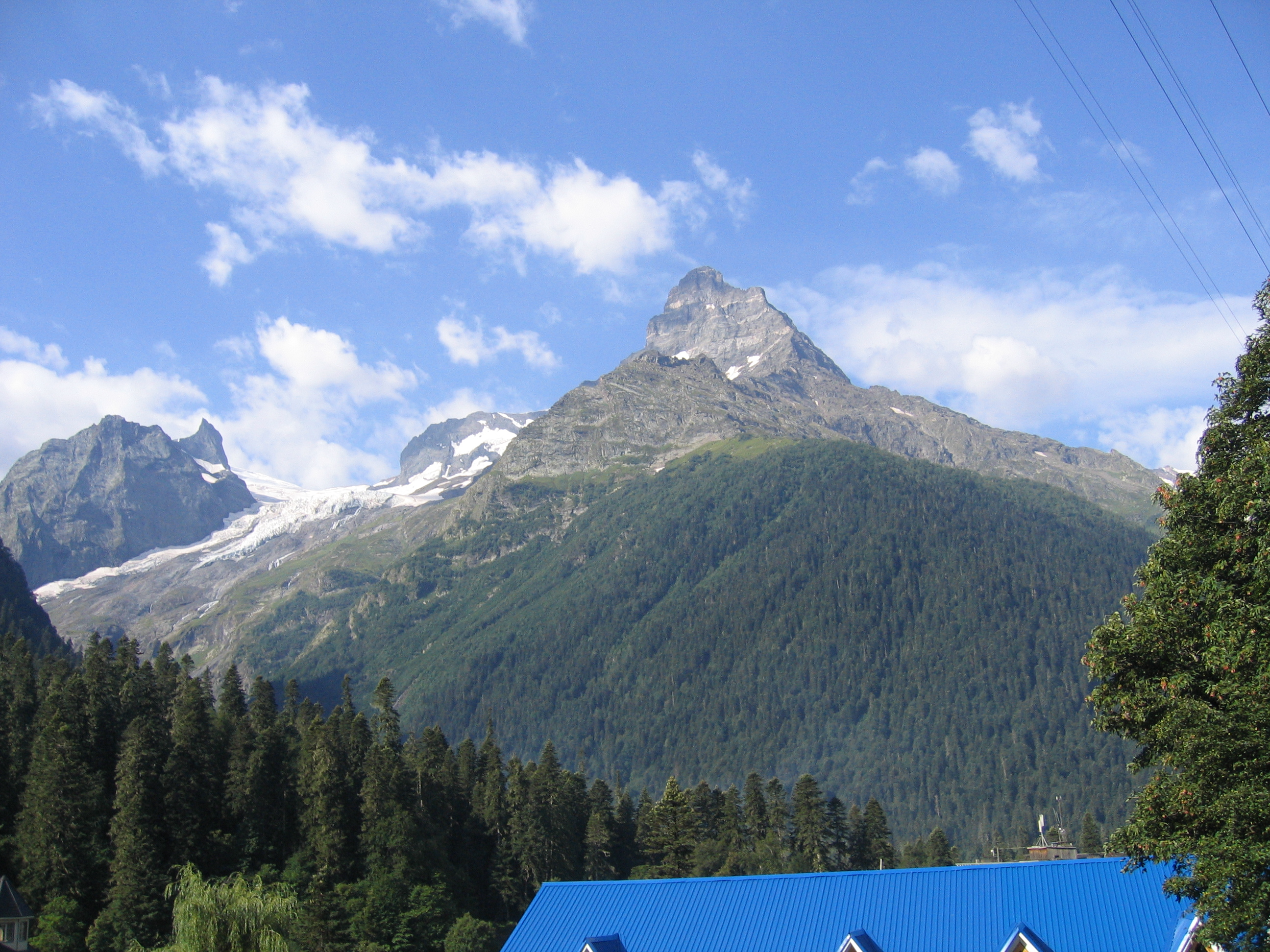
- Belalakaya seen from Dombay

Highest point
- Elevation: 3,861 m (12,667 ft)
- Coordinates: 43°15′54″N 41°35′05″E

Geography
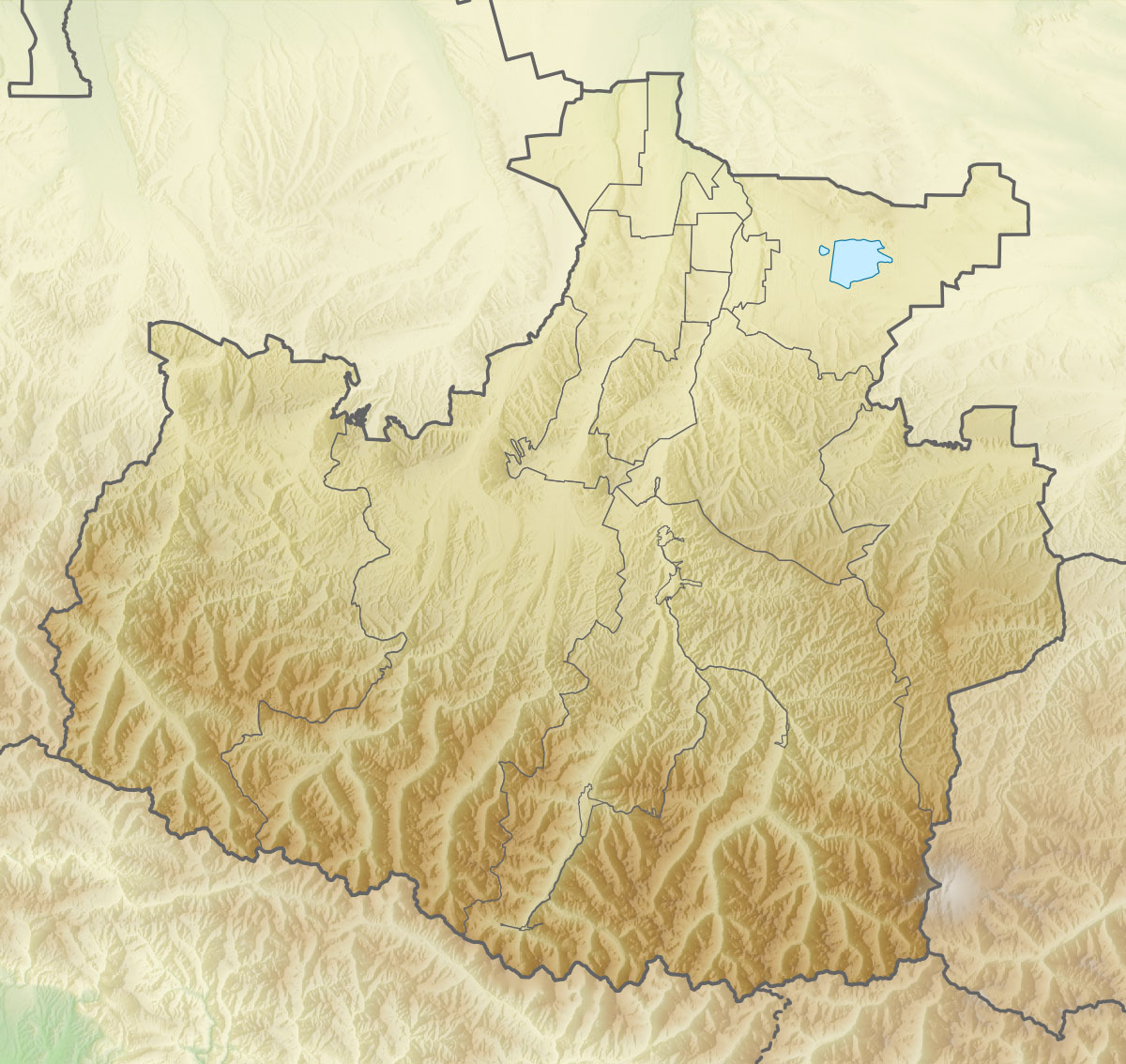
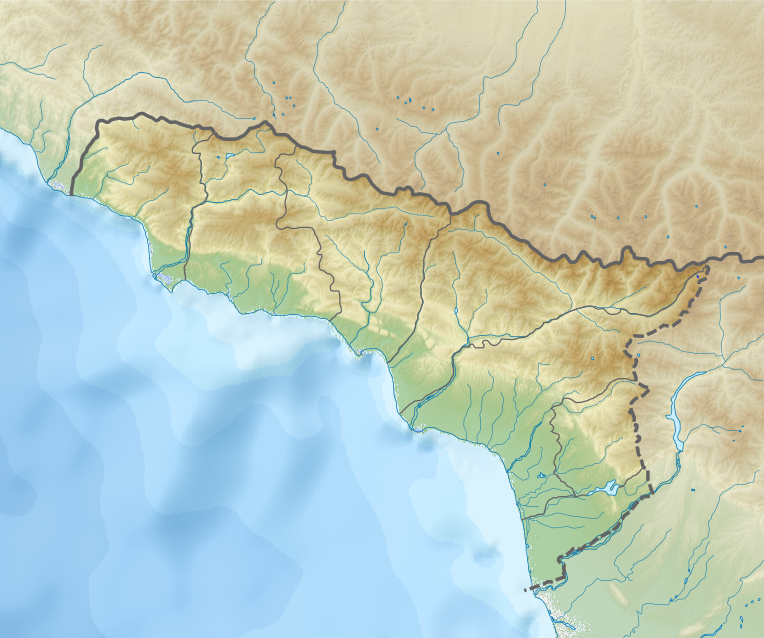
- Location within Karachay-Cherkessia Location within Abkhazia Location within Caucasus Mountains Location within European Russia
- Country: Karachay-Cherkessia
- Parent range: Caucasus Mountains

The Belalakaya (3,861 m) is a mountain in the Karachay-Cherkessia, Greater Caucasus mountain range of the Russian Federation. It is named after the layers of white quartz that can be seen in its rock walls. The peak has a height of 3861 meters, and to its east is the Malaya Belalakaya peak, which is 3740 meters tall.

The first ascent to the summit of Belalakaya was made in 1904 by a group of mountain climbers and guides during an expedition of the Russian Mining Society to the upper reaches of the Teberda River. The group was led by the chairman of the Russian Mining Society, Alexander von Meck, and included the Swiss climber Andreas Fischer, along with mountain guides Christian Yossi and Yani Buzurganov. On July 29, 1904, the group successfully reached the summit for the first time. The peak has a height of 3861 meters, and to its east is the Malaya Belalakaya peak, which is 3740 meters tall.

In 1934, another group of climbers made the second ascent to the summit of Belalakaya. This group was composed of G. Prokudaev, I. Korzun, A. Feld, and P. Tsalagov. Since then, Belalakaya has become a popular destination for climbers and outdoor enthusiasts, and the peak is considered one of the more challenging climbs in the Greater Caucasus range.

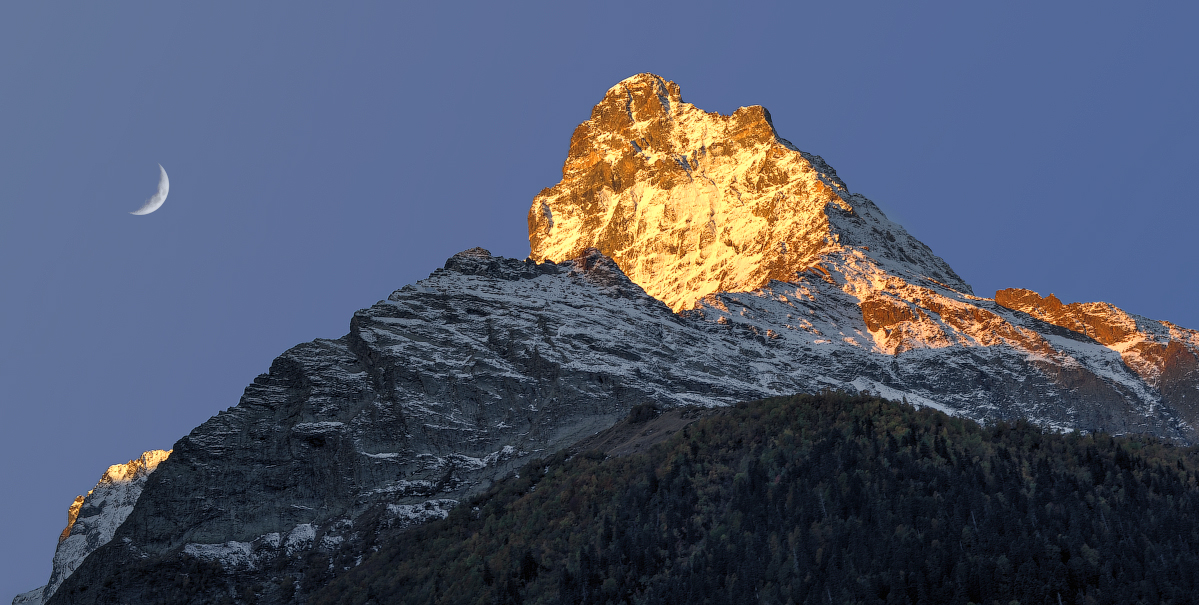
Belalakaya at dawn.
