= Kuznetsk Alatau Nature Reserve =

Nature reserve in Kemerovo Oblast, Russia

- Russian: Кузнецкий Алатау заповедник
- IUCN category Ia (strict nature reserve)
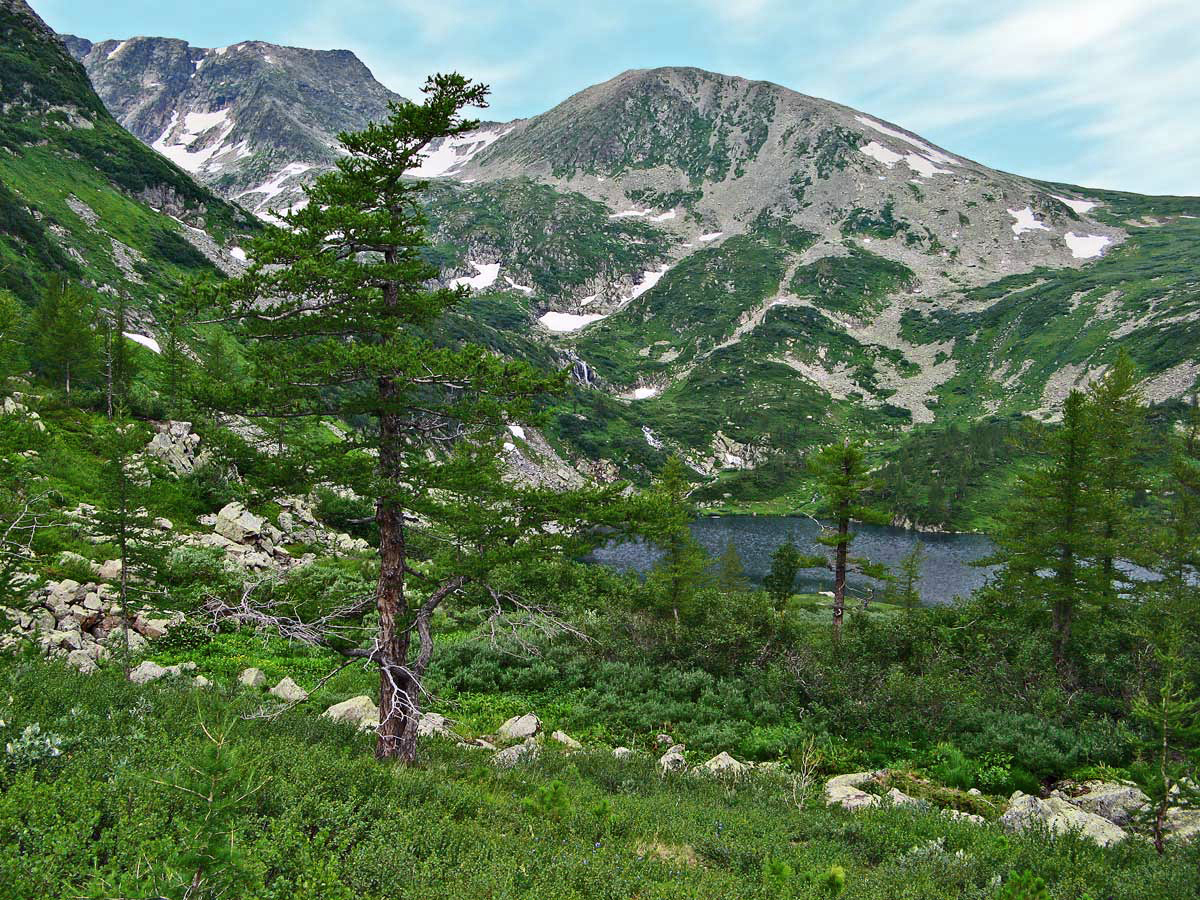
- Kuznetsk Alatau

- Location within Russia
- Location: Kemerovo Oblast
- Nearest city: Mezhdurechensk, Kemerovo Oblast
- Coordinates: 53°45′0″N 89°15′0″E
- Area: 412,900 hectares (1,020,298 acres; 1,594 sq mi)
- Established: 1989
- Governing body: Ministry of Natural Resources and Environment (Russia)
- Website: http://www.kuz-alatau.ru/

Kuznetsk Alatau Nature Reserve (Russian: Кузнецкий Алатау заповедник) is a Russian 'zapovednik' (strict nature reserve) on the Kuznetsk Alatau, a mountain ridge in the Altai-Sayan mountain region in southwestern Siberia. The Kuznetsk Alatau consists of several ranges of medium height, between which there are river valleys. The reserve is in the watershed of the Tom River and the Chuly River. It is spread over three districts of Kemerovo Oblast: Tisulsky District, Mezhdurechensky District, and Novokuznetsky District. The reserve was established in 1989 and covers an area of 412,900 ha (1,594 sq mi).

== Topography ==
The Kuznetsk Alatau Reserve has a terrain that organized on a series of three relatively flat levels ascending a mountain ridge cut with river valleys. It is on the western slope of the Kuznetsk Alatau ridge, and on the south by the Abakan Ridge of the Western Sayan Mountains. The highest peak has an altitude of 1,873 metres (6,145 ft). 5-8% of the reserve is alpine, with terrain typical of glacial origin: troughs, cirque lakes, etc. Below the alpine belt, 1600–1250 meters, is a region of flattened land with scattered blocks of igneous rocks and tundra landscapes with dwarf willows, birches, sedges, mosses, lichens and some mountain bogs. About a third of the ridge is between 1250 and 1000 meters, and is covered with coniferous dark taiga and cedar forest. Through this are cut river valleys through layers of limestone and schists with rocky outcrops. The northwestern sector of the reserve, from 1000 to 800 meters, is pine and fir forest. The slopes are covered with limestone-free clay soil.

== Climate and ecoregion ==
Kuznetsk Alatau is located in the Sayan montane conifer forests ecoregion. This ecoregion covers the middle-elevations of the highest mountains in the Altai-Sayan mountain range of central Asia. It lies between the Siberian taiga to the north, and the Mongolian steppe to the south. The ecoregion is characterized by mountains desiccated with river valleys, high levels of precipitation, and high biodiversity. Flora is generally dependent on the elevation and terrain, with forest having three main subzones based on altitude: light needle-leaf sparse taiga, dark needle-leaf taiga, and dark taiga.

The climate of Kuznetsk Alatau is Subarctic climate, without dry season (Köppen climate classification Subarctic climate (Dfc)). This climate is characterized by mild summers (only 1–3 months above 10 °C (50.0 °F)) and cold, snowy winters (coldest month below −3 °C (26.6 °F)). In the Kuznetsk Reserve, July is the hottest month (16.6 °C (61.9 °F)); January is the coldest (15.5 °C (59.9 °F)). Precipitation ranges from 1,200 to 1,500 mm/year.

== Flora and fauna ==
The plant life of the reserve is highly zoned by altitude. There are 235 species at the alpine level, 117 in the middle level, and 154 species in small plots of rocky steppe on the lower slopes. Scientists on the reserve have recorded 625 a total species of vascular plants.

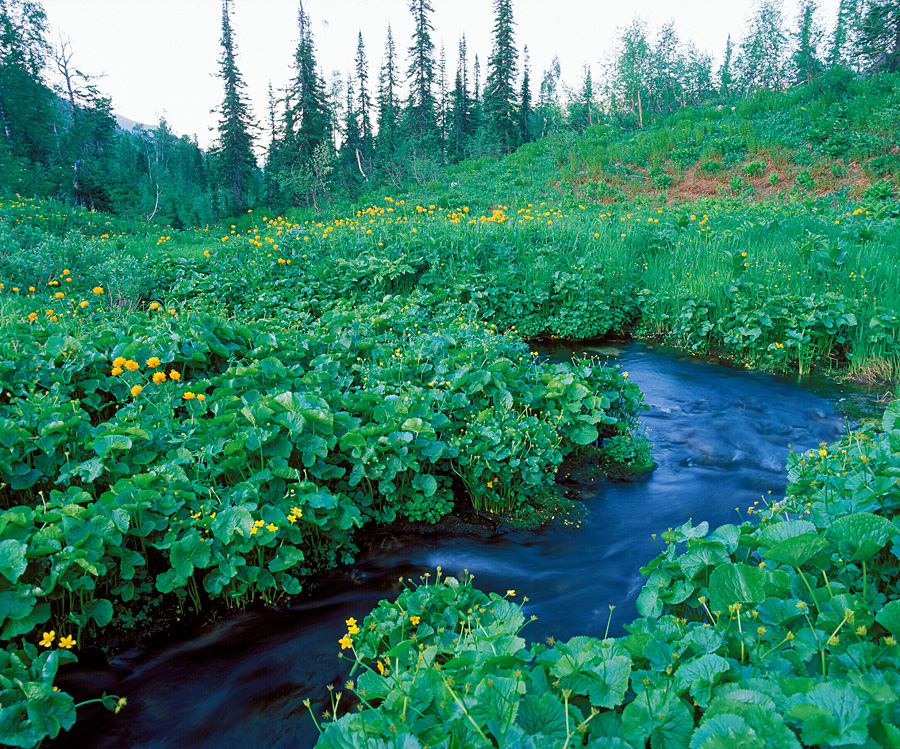
Alpine creek in Kuznetsk Reserve (photo: ru:Igor Shpilenok)

The animal life of the reserve is mostly that of the boreal taiga, with some mountain and steppe communities. The most common mammals are rodents. The beaver has been reintroduced and now inhabits most river valleys; the number of individuals was about 200-250 individuals in 2016. Kuznetsk is an Important Bird Area as designated by Birdlife International.

== Ecoeducation and access ==
As a strict nature reserve, the Kuznetsk Alatau Reserve is mostly closed to the general public, although scientists and those with 'environmental education' purposes can make arrangements with park management for visits. There are three 'ecotourist' river rafting routes in the reserve, however, that are made available to guided tours for the public. These require permits to be obtained in advance. There is also a snowmobile route and an ecological center. The main office is in the city of Mezhdurechensk, Kemerovo Oblast.

== See also ==
- List of Russian Nature Reserves (class 1a 'zapovedniks')
- National Parks of Russia
- Verkhny Zub
