= Verblyuzhka =

Mountain in Orenburg Oblast, Russia

Verblyuzhka is a mountain in the Belyaesky District of Orenburg region in Russia. The mountain is a three-headed butte, towering 198 m above the water level of the Urals. From the side the mountain looks "double-humped" which is the reason for its name (Verblyuzhka means little camel in Russian). The origin of the mountain is associated with the increased stability of the rocks it consists of and erosional activity of the Ural River and Elshanka river that flows into Urals. These rivers had sawed across the anticline fold elongated to north-west towards the village of Kandurovkain in two places. The slopes of the ridge of armored with layers of limestone from Кurmainskiy suit of Asselian formation of Permian period. These layers are well exposed in the southern cliff above the floodplain of the Ural River. The limestones often smell of bitumen, which drew the attention of E. A. Eversmann already in 1840, describing them as "stinkers". Amongst the thin layers at the top of the cliff a more powerful (up to 80 cm) layer that consists of a limestone breccia can be traced. These types of breccia usually are of marine origin and are formed by near-bottom turbidity currents.

East side of the mountain is even steeper than the west slope because of the deep bedding layers . The top of cut off fold didn't preserve, therefore susceptible to erosion siltstones and sandstones ended up in the central part of the mountain. Due to the instability of these rocks a saddle between the "humps" of the camel-mountain has formed.

Steppe vegetation covering the tops and slopes of Verblyuzhka consists of typical petrophytes, including calcicole. Among them there are many relicts and endemisms. Here grow Ephedra distachya, Clausia solntsepechnaya, Onosma simplicissima, trisetum desert, Hedysarum macranthon, thyme guberlinsky and other plants.
