= Pik Pushkina =

Mountain in Russia

Pushkin Peak
- Pik Pushkina
- Location within Russia

Highest point
- Elevation: 5,100 m (16,700 ft)
- Prominence: 50 m (160 ft)
- Coordinates: 43°2′58″N 43°8′9″E

Geography
- Location: Russia
- Republic: Kabardino-Balkaria
- Parent range: Caucasus

Climbing
- First ascent: 1961, "Spartak" team led by Kletsko
- Easiest route: Rock/snow/ice climb

Pushkin Peak, also known as Pik Pushkina (Russian: Пик Пушкина), is a mountain peak in the central part of the Lateral Caucasus Range. It is approximately 5,100 m (16,700 ft) above sea level and located in Kabardino-Balkaria. It is part of the Dykh-Tau area of the Caucasus in the Kabardino-Balkaria Nature Reserve between Eastern Dykh-Tau and Borovikov Peak. Climbing routes have a category of difficulty up to 5B.

Pushkin Peak is included in the list of ten peaks of the Russian Federation for awarding the title of the Snow Leopard of Russia, which is the award given to people who have climbed up the ten highest peaks of Russia.

It was named in 1938 in honor of the 100th anniversary of the death of Alexander Pushkin.

== See also ==
- List of mountains and hills of Russia
