= Gebek Kala =

- Chechen: Гебек-кхала
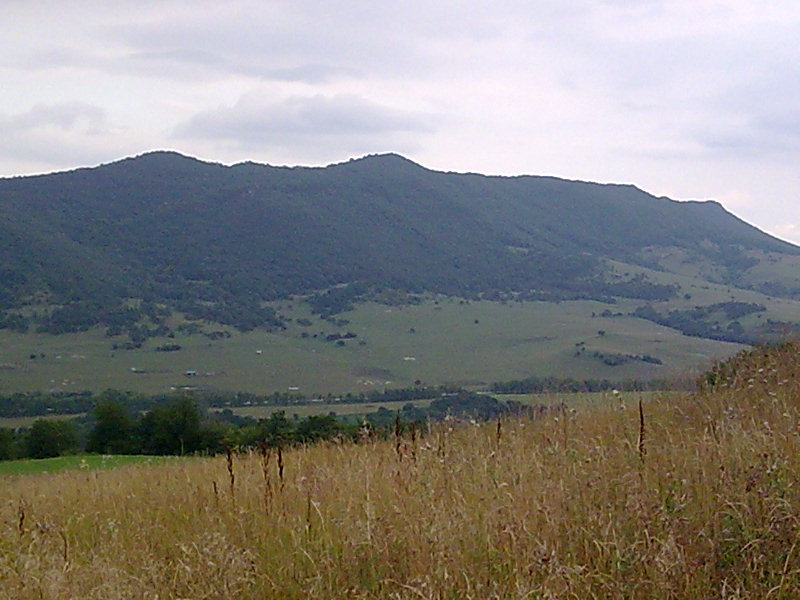

Highest point
- Coordinates: 43.1034°N 46.6388°E

Geography
- Location within Russia

Gebek Kala (Chechen: Гебек-кхала) is a mountain peak in the Kazbek district of Dagestan, with an elevation of 917 meters (3,009 ft) above sea level.

The name of a Chechen translated as "strengthening (castle) Gebek".

In the area of Mount Gebek Kala was the last battle of the Chechens and who came to their aid with Laks Mongol troops.
