= Mount Kholodilnik =

Mountain in Primorsky Krai, Russia

Kholodilnik Mountain
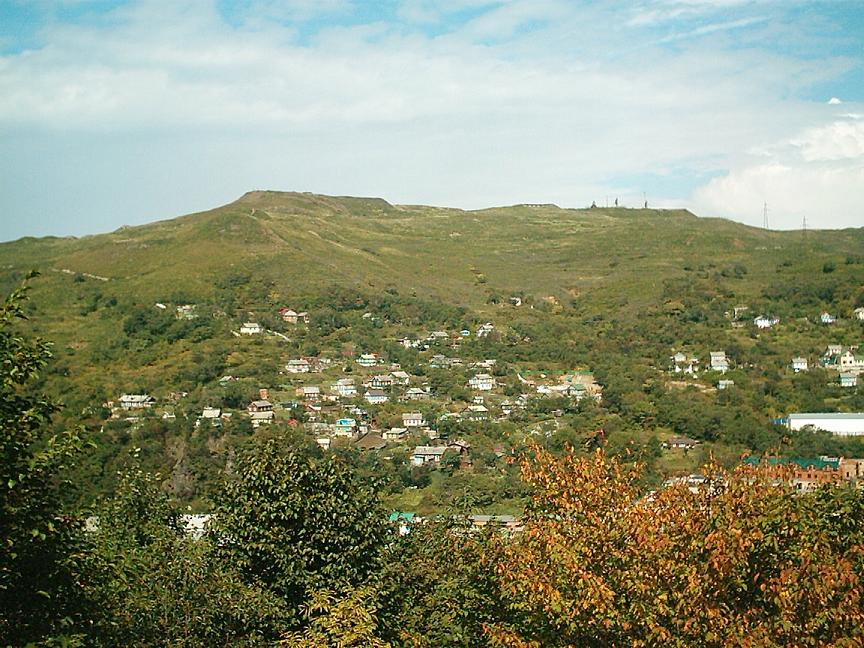

Highest point
- Elevation: 257 m (843 ft)
- Coordinates: 43°8′43″N 131°56′24″E

Geography
- Location: Vladivostok, Primorsky Krai, Russia
- Parent range: Sikhote-Alin Mountains

Kholodilnik Mountain (Russian: гора́ Холоди́льник or со́пка Холодильник; lit. "Mt. Refrigerator", formerly Mount Muravyov-Amursky), is a mountain in eastern Russia. It is located in Primorsky Krai, and is in the highest peak within the city of Vladivostok at 257.9 m.

There are fortifications near the summit, some of which are abandoned, while others are still used by the military. Tourists can visit the mountain to see the buildings and cellars of Fort Count Muravyov-Amursky and Soviet naval battery No. 198 "Kholodilnik" (built 1935), as well as the four remaining 130-mm B-13-3s battery guns.

Mount Kholodilnik features many picnic areas on its eastern slope, as well as a pure water spring. The slopes are used for the open championship of the Far East for downhill and cross-country skiing. Mount Kholodilnik is also used by mountain paragliders.

Geologically, the hills to the south of Vladivostok are part of the Sikhote-Alin range.
