= Verkhny Zub =

Mountain in Kemerovo Oblast, Russia

- Верхний Зуб / Амзас-Таскыл / Тигір тізі
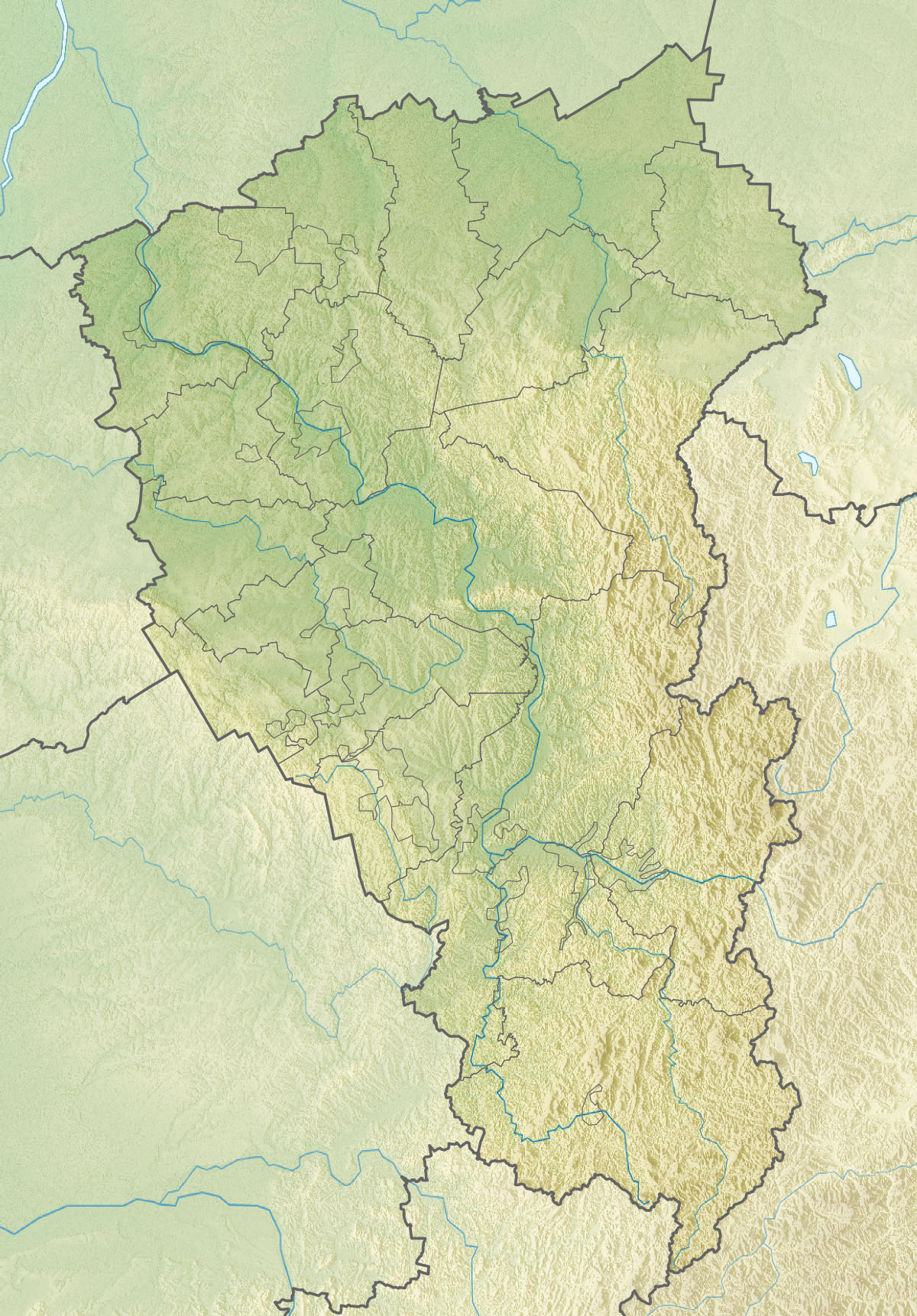
- Location within Kemerovo Oblast Location within Russia

Highest point
- Elevation: 2,178 m (7,146 ft)
- Prominence: 385 m (1,263 ft)
- Coordinates: 53°50′17″N 89°14′14″E

Geography
- Location: Kemerovo Oblast, Russia
- Parent range: Kuznetsk Alatau; South Siberian Mountains

Verkhny Zub (Russian: Верхний Зуб, Shor: Амзас-Таскыл, romanized: Amzas-Taskıl, Khakas: Тигір тізі, romanized: Tigĕr tĕzĕ) is a peak in Kemerovo Oblast, Russia. It is the highest point of the federal subject.

The name of the mountain in the Khakas language "Тигір тізі" means "heavenly tooth". The mountain is part of the Kuznetsk Alatau State Nature Reserve, a protected area.

== Description ==
Verkhny Zub is a 2,178 metres (7,146 ft) high mountain located in the Kuznetsk Alatau, South Siberian System. It rises in the southern area of the range, in the Mezhdurechensky Urban Okrug at the eastern limit of Kemerovo Oblast, near the border of Khakassia.

At the foot of the mountain, there are numerous cirque lakes. Dark coniferous taiga grows on the lower mountain slopes. On steep slopes up to a height of 1,300 metres (4,300 ft) there is mountain tundra, above which there is the nival zone with snowfields at the top.

== See also ==
- Highest points of Russian Federal subjects
- List of mountains and hills of Russia
