= Volcanoes of Kamchatka =

Large group of volcanoes on the Kamchatka peninsula, Russia

UNESCO World Heritage Site
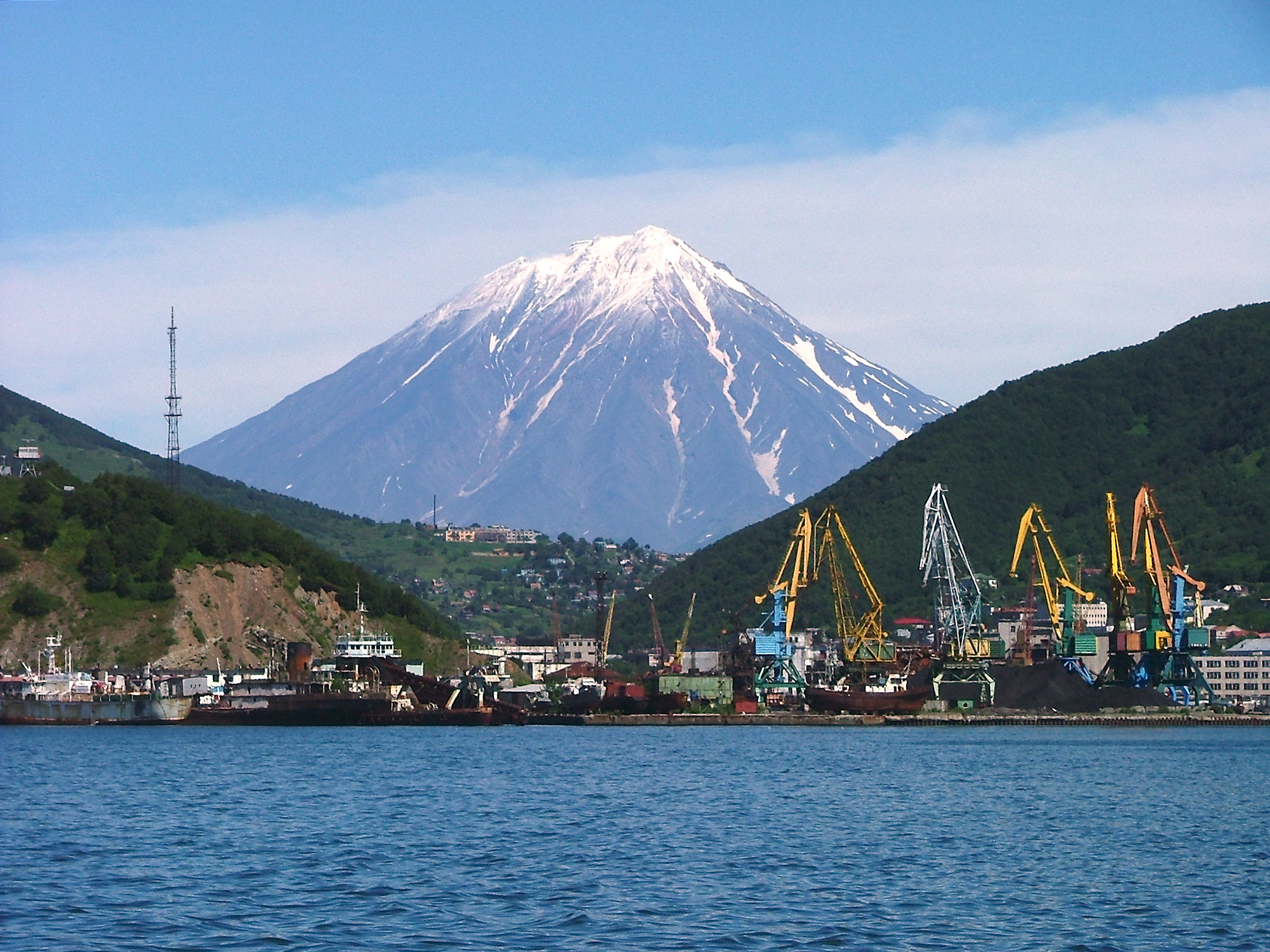
- Koryaksky volcano rising above Petropavlovsk-Kamchatsky

- Location within Russia
- Location: Kamchatka Krai, Russia
- Includes: 1. Kronotsky Strict Nature Reserve; 2. Southern Kamchatka Wildlife Reserve; 3. Nalychevo Regional Nature Park; 4. Bystrinsky Regional Nature Park; 5. Southern Kamchatka Regional Nature Park; 6. Kluchevskoy Regional Nature Park
- Criteria: Natural: (vii)(viii)(ix)(x)
- Reference: 765bis
- Inscription: 1996 (20th Session)
- Extensions: 2001
- Area: 3,830,200 ha (14,788 sq mi)
- Coordinates: 56°20′N 158°30′E

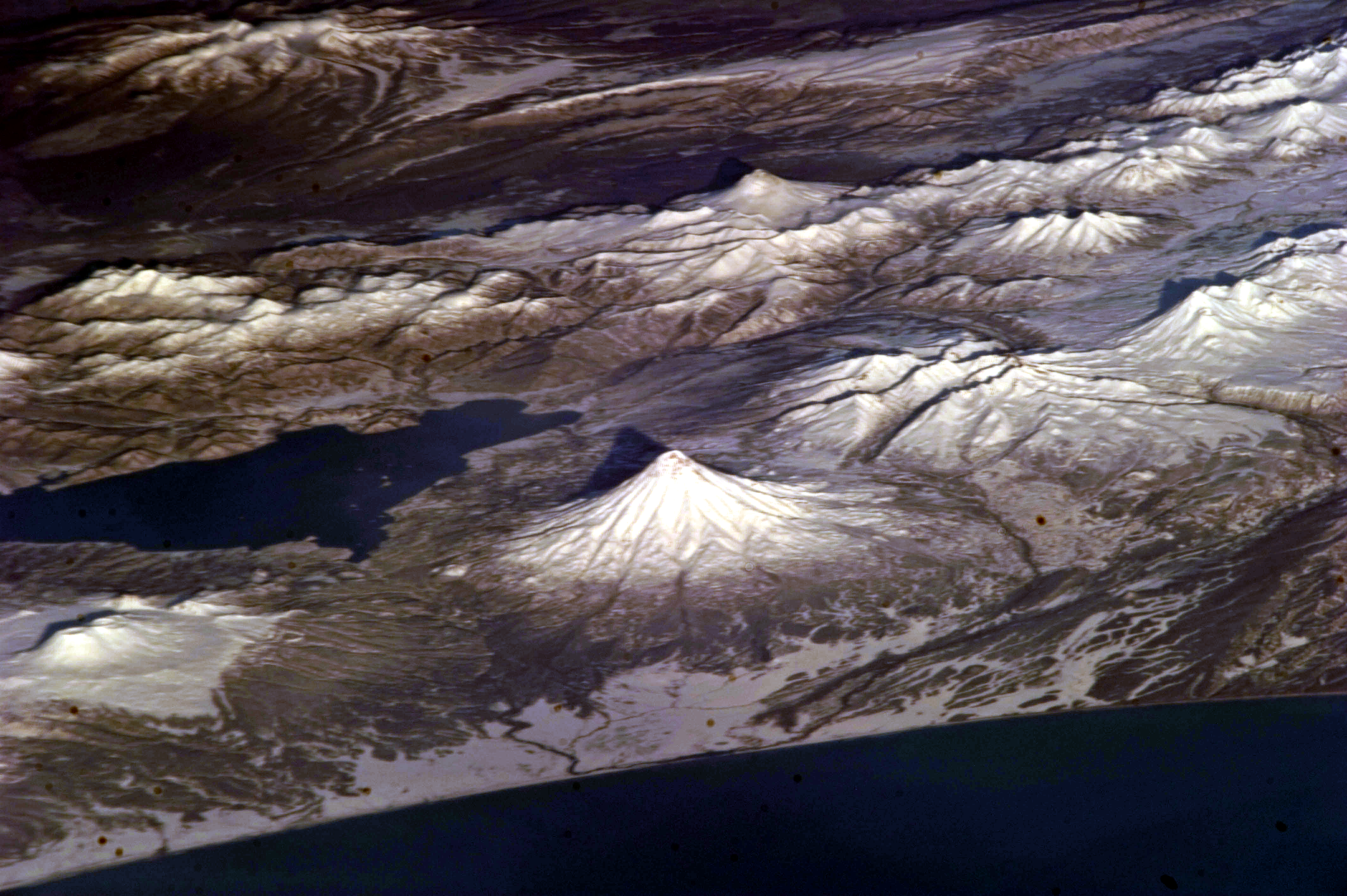
This astronaut photograph illustrates some of the volcanoes on Russia's Kamchatka Peninsula.

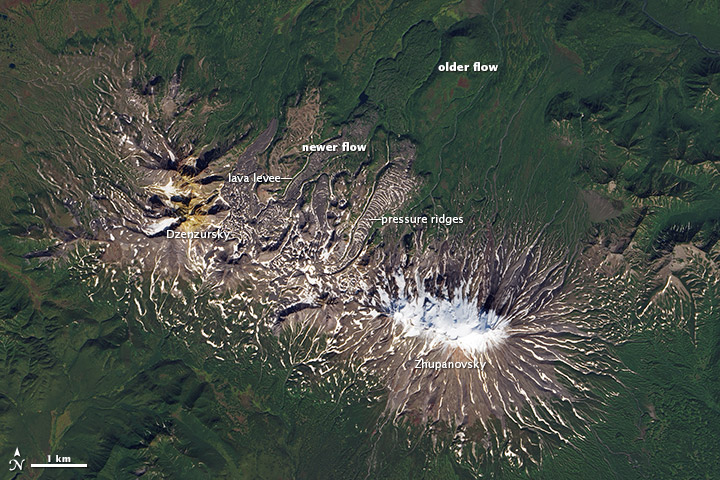
This Landsat photo illustrates volcanic features of recent flows at Zhupanovsky and Dzenzursky volcanoes.

The volcanoes of Kamchatka are a large group of volcanoes situated on the Kamchatka Peninsula, in eastern Russia. The Kamchatka River and the surrounding central side valley are flanked by large volcanic belts containing around 160 volcanoes, 29 of them still active. The peninsula has a high density of volcanoes and associated volcanic phenomena, with 29 active volcanoes being included in the six UNESCO World Heritage List sites in the Volcanoes of Kamchatka group, most of them on the Kamchatka Peninsula.

== Geography ==
The highest volcano is Klyuchevskaya Sopka (4,750 m or 15,584 ft), the largest active volcano in the Northern Hemisphere, while the most striking is Kronotsky, whose perfect cone was said by celebrated volcanologists Robert and Barbara Decker to be a prime candidate for the world's most beautiful volcano. Somewhat more accessible are the three volcanoes visible from Petropavlovsk-Kamchatsky: Koryaksky, Avachinsky, and Kozelsky. In the center of Kamchatka is Eurasia's world-famous Geyser Valley which was partly destroyed by a massive mudslide in June 2007.

Owing to the Kuril–Kamchatka Trench, deep-focus seismic events and tsunamis are fairly common. A pair of megathrust earthquakes occurred off the coast on October 16, 1737, and on November 4, 1952, in the magnitude of ~9.3 and 8.2 respectively. A chain of more shallow earthquakes were recorded as recently as April 2006.

== List of volcanoes from north to south ==
Volcanoes of Kamchatka
Name	Last Erupted	Height (m)	Type	Volcanic Arc	Coordinates
Iettunup	Pleistocene	1340	Shield	Central	58.40°N 161.08°E
Voyampolsky	Pleistocene	1103	Shield	Central	58.37°N 160.63°E
Severny	1550 BCE	1936	Shield	Central	58.28°N 160.87°E
Langtutkin	Pleistocene	1545	Shield	Central	58.23°N 161.10°E
Snegovoy	Pleistocene	2169	Shield	Central	58.20°N 160.97°E
Ostry	2050 BCE	2552	Composite	Central	58.18°N 160.82°E
Spokoiny	3450 BCE	2171	Composite	Central	58.13°N 160.82°E
Iktunup	Pleistocene	2300	Shield	Central	58.08°N 160.77°E
Keveney	Pleistocene	1887	Shield	Central	58.05°N 160.73°E
Snezhniy	Pleistocene	2169	Shield	Central	58.02°N 160.80°E
Nylgimelkin or Atlasova	3550 BCE	1764	Shield	Central	57.97°N 160.65°E
Khuvkhoitun	Pleistocene	2618	Composite	Central	57.92°N 160.65°E
Bely	Pleistocene	2080	Shield	Central	57.88°N 160.53°E
Plosky	Pleistocene	1255	Shield	Central	57.83°N 160.25°E
Kaileney	Pleistocene	1582	Shield	Central	57.80°N 160.67°E
Ulvaney	Pleistocene	1445	Shield	Central	57.78°N 160.62°E
Tekletunup	Pleistocene	1395	Shield	Central	57.75°N 160.23°E
Mutny	Pleistocene	1345	Shield	Central	57.72°N 160.37°E
Uka	Pleistocene	1607	Shield	Central	57.71°N 160.59°E
Alngey	Pleistocene	1822	Composite	Central	57.70°N 160.42°E
Kamenisty	Pleistocene	1762	Composite	Central	57.65°N 160.43°E
Elovsky	7550 BCE	1381	Shield	Central	57.55°N 160.53°E
Pirozhnikova	Pleistocene	1646	Composite	Central	57.53°N 160.34°E
Shlen	Pleistocene	1001	Shield	Central	57.48°N 159.57°E
Mezhdusopochny	Pleistocene	1641	Shield	Central	57.47°N 160.25°E
Shishel	Pleistocene	2525	Shield	Central	57.45°N 160.37°E
Titila	550 BCE	1523	Shield	Central	57.41°N 160.11°E
Bliznetsy	1060 BCE	265	Minor	Central	57.35°N 161.37°E
Kinenin	850 CE	583	Minor	Central	57.35°N 160.97°E
Gorny Institute	1250 CE	2125	Composite	Central	57.33°N 160.20°E
Kunkhilok	Pleistocene	1151	Composite	Central	57.32°N 160.48°E
Tuzovsky	Pleistocene	1516	Shield	Central	57.32°N 159.97°E
Sedanka Lava Field	7050 BCE	1399	Cluster	Central	57.32°N 160.07°E
Leutongey	Pleistocene	1318	Shield	Central	57.31°N 159.83°E
Uchkoren	Pleistocene	625	Composite	Central	57.27°N 161.35°E
Lyzyk	Pleistocene	442	Minor	Central	57.23°N 161.52°E
Terpuk	800 BCE	765	Shield	Central	57.20°N 159.83°E
Shisheika	2240 BCE	355	Minor (Basaltic)	Central	57.15°N 161.09°E
Fedotych	Pleistocene	965	Shield	Central	57.13°N 160.40°E
Kebeney	Pleistocene	1527	Shield	Central	57.10°N 159.93°E
Bolshoy Ketepana	Pleistocene	1521	Shield	Central	57.05°N 158.37°E
Ovalny	Pleistocene	732	Shield	Central	56.98°N 158.98°E
Bliznets	Pleistocene	1244	Composite	Central	56.97°N 159.78°E
Unnamed	Pleistocene	562	Shield	Central	56.97°N 158.75°E
Kalgauch	Pleistocene	1206	Composite	Central	56.93°N 159.73°E
Unnamed	Pleistocene	1081	Minor	Central	56.93°N 159.95°E
Bolshoy Chekchebonay	Pleistocene	1391	Shield	Central	56.92°N 159.42°E
Zaozerny	Pleistocene	1349	Shield	Central	56.88°N 159.95°E
Pogranychny	Pleistocene	1427	Shield	Central	56.85°N 159.80°E
Cherny	Pleistocene	1778	Composite	Central	56.82°N 159.67°E
Dvukhyurtochny	Pleistocene	1631	Shield	Central	56.82°N 159.88°E
Tigilsky	Pleistocene	1362	Shield	Central	56.81°N 159.11°E
Maly Chekchebonay	Pleistocene	1247	Shield	Central	56.80°N 159.45°E
Kireunsky	Pleistocene	1925	Shield	Central	56.78°N 159.75°E
Malaya Ketepana	Pleistocene	1230	Shield	Central	56.68°N 158.47°E
Alney-Chashakondzha	1600 CE	2570	Composite	Central	56.66°N 159.65°E
Sheveluch	2025 CE	3283	Composite	Eastern	56.65°N 161.36°E
Eggella	Pleistocene	1046	Shield	Central	56.57°N 158.52°E
Perevalovyi	Pleistocene	1328	Shield	Central	56.57°N 159.35°E
Chavycha	Pleistocene	1190	Shield	Central	56.55°N 158.65°E
Unnamed	Pleistocene	200	Cluster	Eastern	56.53°N 160.87°E
Yanpat	Pleistocene	1205	Shield	Central	56.53°N 158.80°E
Verkhovoy	Pleistocene	1400	Shield	Central	56.52°N 159.53°E
Bolshoi-Kekuknaysky	5310 BCE	1401	Shield	Central	56.48°N 157.92°E
Kopkan	Pleistocene	1120	Shield	Central	56.48°N 158.83°E
Maly Alney	Pleistocene	1858	Composite	Central	56.47°N 159.77°E
Kharchinsky	Pleistocene	1410	Composite	Eastern	56.42°N 160.82°E
Buduli	Pleistocene	1477	Shield	Central	56.40°N 158.70°E
Kekurny	Pleistocene	1377	Shield	Central	56.40°N 158.85°E
Zarechny	Pleistocene	760	Caldera	Eastern	56.38°N 160.83°E
Krainy	Pleistocene	1554	Shield	Central	56.37°N 159.03°E
Kulkev	Pleistocene	915	Shield	Central	56.37°N 158.37°E
Geodesistov	Pleistocene	1170	Shield	Central	56.33°N 158.67°E
Anaun	Pleistocene	1828	Composite	Central	56.32°N 158.83°E
Ushkovsky	1890 CE	3943	Composite	Eastern	56.11°N 160.51°E
Nosichan	Pleistocene	1105	Shield	Central	56.08°N 157.75°E
Uksichan	Pleistocene	1692	Shield	Central	56.08°N 158.38°E
Klyuchevskoy	2025 CE	4754	Composite	Eastern	56.06°N 160.64°E
Kamen	Unknown - Evidence Credible	4585	Composite	Eastern	56.02°N 160.59°E
Bezymianny	2025 CE	2882	Composite	Eastern	55.97°N 160.59°E
Etopan	Pleistocene	1264	Shield	Central	55.97°N 157.63°E
Bolshoi Payalpan	Pleistocene	1906	Shield	Central	55.88°N 157.78°E
Unnamed	Pleistocene	1821	Composite	Central	55.88°N 158.83°E
Zimina	Unknown - Evidence Credible	3057	Composite	Eastern	55.86°N 160.60°E
Tynua	Pleistocene	1727	Shield	Central	55.85°N 157.87°E
Tolbachik	2013 CE	3611	Shield	Eastern	55.83°N 160.33°E
Bongabti	Pleistocene	1790	Shield	Central	55.83°N 158.32°E
Maly Payalpan	Pleistocene	1802	Shield	Central	55.82°N 157.98°E
Udina	Unknown - Evidence Credible	2886	Composite	Eastern	55.76°N 160.53°E
Bolshaya Romanovka	Pleistocene	1821	Shield	Central	55.73°N 158.77°E
Ichinsky	1740 CE	3596	Composite	Central	55.68°N 157.72°E
Romanovka	Pleistocene	1442	Composite	Central	55.65°N 158.80°E
Kozyrevsky	Pleistocene	2004	Shield	Central	55.64°N 158.37°E
Ochchamo	Pleistocene	2136	Shield	Central	55.62°N 158.15°E
Bolshoy Kozyrevsky	Pleistocene	1672	Shield	Central	55.60°N 158.52°E
Cherpuk Group	4550 BCE	1868	Minor	Central	55.55°N 157.47°E
Unnamed	Pleistocene	2140	Shield	Central	55.52°N 158.43°E
Prodolny	Pleistocene	1505	Shield	Eastern	55.45°N 157.25°E
Akhtang	Pleistocene	1956	Shield	Central	55.43°N 158.65°E
Kobalan	Pleistocene	1174	Composite	Eastern	55.43°N 157.37°E
Piip	5050 BCE	-300	Composite	Aleutian	55.42°N 167.33°E
Tumrok	Pleistocene	2197	Shield	Eastern	55.37°N 160.87°E
Lauchachan	Pleistocene	1018	Shield	Eastern	55.35°N 157.10°E
Piip	Pleistocene	2059	Shield	Eastern	55.32°N 160.67°E
Kimitina	Pleistocene	1438	Composite	Central	55.25°N 158.18°E
Iult	Pleistocene	1857	Composite	Eastern	55.23°N 160.59°E
Konechnaya	Pleistocene	1725	Shield	Eastern	55.23°N 160.97°E
Sokol	Pleistocene	1711	Composite	Eastern	55.20°N 160.52°E
Plosky	Pleistocene	1200	Shield	Central	55.19°N 158.48°E
Kizimen	2013 CE	2334	Composite	Eastern	55.13°N 160.32°E
Bogachensky	Pleistocene	1450	Shield	Eastern	55.13°N 160.90°E
Konradi	Pleistocene	1912	Composite	Eastern	55.08°N 160.53°E
Vysoky	550 BCE	2129	Composite	Eastern	55.06°N 160.76°E
Komarov	950 CE	2065	Composite	Eastern	55.03°N 160.72°E
Gamchen	550 BCE	2539	Composite	Eastern	54.97°N 160.70°E
Schmidt	Pleistocene	2020	Shield	Eastern	54.92°N 160.63°E
Khangar	1500 CE	1967	Composite	Central	54.76°N 157.41°E
Kronotsky	1923 CE	3482	Composite	Eastern	54.75°N 160.53°E
Adamozhets	Pleistocene	1502	Minor	Eastern	54.69°N 159.48°E
Unana	Pleistocene	2131	Composite	Eastern	54.63°N 159.72°E
Krasheninnikov	2025 CE	1816	Composite	Eastern	54.60°N 160.27°E
Taunshits	550 BCE	2301	Composite	Eastern	54.53°N 159.80°E
Kikhpinych	1550 CE	1515	Composite	Eastern	54.49°N 160.25°E
Uzon	200 CE	1617	Caldera	Eastern	54.49°N 159.97°E
Unnamed	Pleistocene	1001	Composite	Eastern	54.37°N 159.43°E
Bolshoi Semiachik	4450 BCE	1720	Composite	Eastern	54.32°N 160.02°E
Maly Semyachik	1952 CE	1527	Composite	Eastern	54.13°N 159.67°E
Karymsky	2025 CE	1513	Composite	Eastern	54.05°N 159.44°E
Razlaty	Pleistocene	1125	Composite	Eastern	54.02°N 159.38°E
Akademia Nauk	1996 CE	1180	Composite	Eastern	53.98°N 159.45°E
Krainy	Pleistocene	1199	Composite	Eastern	53.95°N 159.33°E
Bakening	550 BCE	2278	Composite	Eastern	53.91°N 158.07°E
Zavaritsky	800 BCE	1567	Minor	Eastern	53.91°N 158.38°E
Ditmara	Pleistocene	1389	Composite	Eastern	53.87°N 159.53°E
Kostakan	1350 CE	1150	Minor (Basaltic)	Eastern	53.83°N 158.05°E
Zhupanovskiye Vostriyaky	Pleistocene	1684	Composite	Eastern	53.80°N 159.28°E
Veer	390 CE	520	Minor (Basaltic)	Eastern	53.75°N 158.45°E
Dzenzursky	Unknown - Evidence Credible	2285	Composite	Eastern	53.64°N 158.92°E
Skalistiy	Pleistocene	1035	Unknown	Eastern	53.63°N 159.29°E
Vershinsky	Pleistocene	1812	Composite	Eastern	53.60°N 158.70°E
Zhupanovsky	2016 CE	2899	Composite	Eastern	53.59°N 159.15°E
Kitkhoysky	Pleistocene	1350	Shield	Eastern	53.58°N 158.56°E
Kupol	Pleistocene	1640	Composite	Eastern	53.50°N 158.65°E
Aak	Pleistocene	2319	Composite	Eastern	53.38°N 158.67°E
Koryaksky	2009 CE	3430	Composite	Eastern	53.32°N 158.71°E
Avachinsky	2001 CE	2717	Composite	Eastern	53.26°N 158.84°E
Barkhatnaya Sopka	3550 BCE	874	Cluster	Kuril	52.80°N 158.24°E
Karymshina	Pleistocene	1200	Caldera	Kuril	52.80°N 158.00°E
Vilyuchinsky	8050 BCE	2173	Composite	Kuril	52.70°N 158.28°E
Bolshaya Ipelka	Pleistocene	1194	Shield	Kuril	52.63°N 156.97°E
Tolmachev Dol	300 CE	1021	Cluster	Kuril	52.63°N 157.58°E
Gorely	2010 CE	1799	Composite	Kuril	52.55°N 158.04°E
Tolmachev	Pleistocene	1118	Composite	Kuril	52.55°N 157.73°E
Opala	1776 CE	2439	Composite	Kuril	52.54°N 157.34°E
Udochka	Pleistocene	891	Shield	Kuril	52.50°N 157.20°E
Mutnovsky	2000 CE	2288	Composite	Kuril	52.45°N 158.20°E
Visokiy	Unknown - Evidence Credible	1227	Cluster	Kuril	52.44°N 157.93°E
Ploskiy	Pleistocene	877	Composite	Kuril	52.37°N 157.62°E
Asacha	Unknown - Evidence Credible	1910	Composite	Kuril	52.35°N 157.83°E
Kamen	Pleistocene	850	Composite	Kuril	52.29°N 157.66°E
Malaya Ipelka	Pleistocene	430	Composite	Kuril	52.28°N 156.73°E
Golaya	Pleistocene	858	Composite	Kuril	52.26°N 157.79°E
Otdelniy	Pleistocene	814	Shield	Kuril	52.22°N 157.44°E
Savan	Pleistocene	901	Shield	Kuril	52.21°N 157.28°E
Krugliy	Pleistocene	1052	Shield	Kuril	52.16°N 157.64°E
Ostanets	Pleistocene	719	Shield	Kuril	52.15°N 157.32°E
Perevalny	Pleistocene	730	Shield	Kuril	52.13°N 157.78°E
Piratkovsky	Pleistocene	1322	Composite	Kuril	52.11°N 157.85°E
Khodutka	300 BCE	2039	Composite	Kuril	52.06°N 157.71°E
Igolki	Pleistocene	707	Shield	Kuril	52.02°N 156.88°E
Olkoviy Volcanic Group	Unknown - Evidence Credible	681	Cluster	Kuril	52.02°N 157.53°E
Skalistiy	Pleistocene	1005	Shield	Kuril	52.02°N 157.18°E
Unnamed	Pleistocene	740	Shield	Kuril	51.95°N 157.02°E
Kuzanek	Pleistocene	968	Shield	Kuril	51.93°N 157.18°E
Vostochnaya Khodutka	Pleistocene	845	Shield	Kuril	51.93°N 157.73°E
Zheltiy	Pleistocene	792	Composite	Kuril	51.93°N 157.60°E
Ozernoy	Pleistocene	562	Shield	Kuril	51.88°N 157.38°E
Kuzheten	Pleistocene	925	Shield	Kuril	51.82°N 157.22°E
Ksudach	1907 CE	1007	Caldera	Kuril	51.80°N 157.53°E
Leviy Koshegochek	Pleistocene	997	Shield	Kuril	51.79°N 156.93°E
Unnamed	Pleistocene	1038	Shield	Kuril	51.75°N 157.06°E
Belenkaya	Pleistocene	892	Composite	Kuril	51.75°N 157.27°E
Sredniy Koshegochek	Pleistocene	1050	Shield	Kuril	51.66°N 156.93°E
Kell	Pleistocene	900	Composite	Kuril	51.65°N 157.35°E
Koshegochek	Pleistocene	1142	Shield	Kuril	51.62°N 156.81°E
Zheltovsky	1923 CE	1926	Composite	Kuril	51.58°N 157.33°E
Yavinsky	4050 BCE	646	Composite	Kuril	51.53°N 156.63°E
Iliinsky	1901 CE	1555	Composite	Kuril	51.50°N 157.20°E
Diky Greben	350 CE	1040	Minor (Silicic)	Kuril	51.45°N 156.98°E
Kurile Lake	6440 BCE	81	Caldera	Kuril	51.45°N 157.12°E
Tretya Rechka	Pleistocene	754	Shield	Kuril	51.40°N 156.57°E
Koshelev	1690 CE	1822	Composite	Kuril	51.36°N 156.75°E
Kambalny	2017 CE	2116	Composite	Kuril	51.31°N 156.88°E
Ded i Baba	Pleistocene	1032	Shield	Kuril	51.30°N 156.58°E
Tumanniy	Pleistocene	681	Shield	Kuril	51.19°N 156.94°E
Vysokii	Pleistocene	708	Composite	Kuril	51.12°N 156.89°E
Mashkovtsev	Pleistocene	503	Composite	Kuril	51.10°N 156.72°E

== See also ==
- List of volcanoes in Russia
