= Tolmachyov (disambiguation) =

Tolmachyov or Tolmachev (Russian: Толмачёв) is a surname.

Tolmachyov or Tolmachev may refer to:

- Tolmachev Dol, Kamchatka, Russia
- Tolmachev Lake, Kamchatka, Russia
- Tolmachev River, Kamchatka, Russia
- Tolmachev Volcano, Kamchatka, Russia
- Tolmachyov, Belgorod Oblast, rural locality, Russia

== See also ==
- Tolmachevo (disambiguation)
