= Talmach =

Talmach may refer to:

- A historical spelling variant for Tollemache family
- A historical German name for Tlmače, Slovakia

== See also ==
- Tolmach
