= List of ultras of Northeast Asia =

This is a list of all the ultra prominent peaks (with topographic prominence greater than 1,500 metres) in Northeast Asia. There are 53 in total.

== Baikal to Okhotsk ==
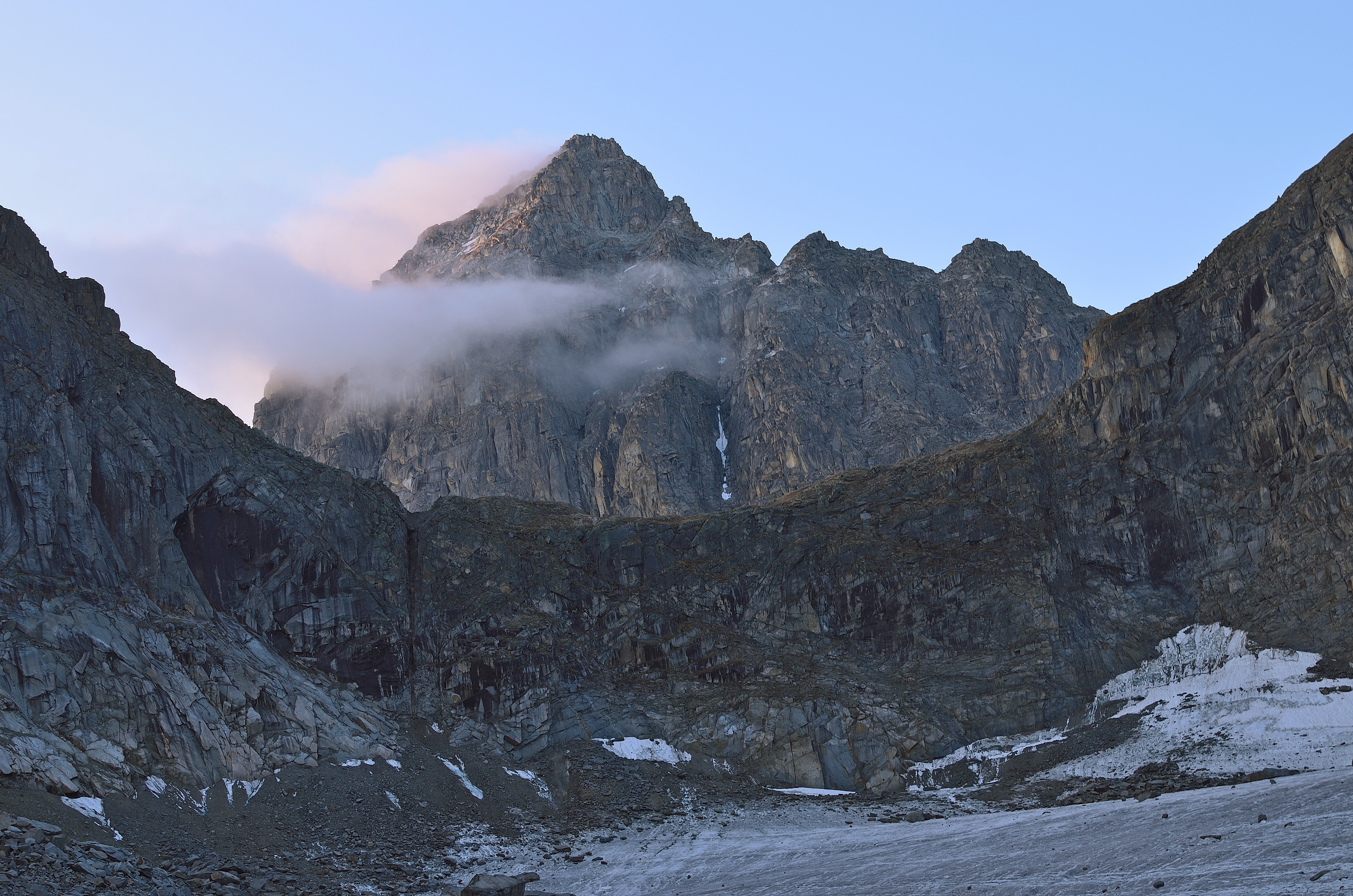
Pik BAM, Kodar Range, Transbaikalia, Russia.

No	Peak	Country	Elevation (m)	Prominence (m)	Col (m)
1	Pik BAM	Russia	3,072	2,230	842
2	Muisky Gigant	Russia	3,067	2,107	960
3	Tordoki Yani	Russia	2,090	1,989	101
4	HP Taikan Range	Russia	2,370	1,915	455
5	HP Upper Angara Range	Russia	2,641	1,819	822
6	HP North Kodar Group	Russia	2,966	1,810	1156
7	Pik Baikal	Russia	2,841	1,723	1118
8	HP Tokinskiy Stanovik	Russia	2,380	1,683	697
9	Gora Lopatina	Russia (Sakhalin)	1,609	1,609	0
10	Mount Chersky	Russia	2,588	1,596	992
11	Mount Shaman	Russia	2,363	1,596	767
12	HP Udokan Range	Russia	2,570	1,501	1069

== Eastern Siberia ==
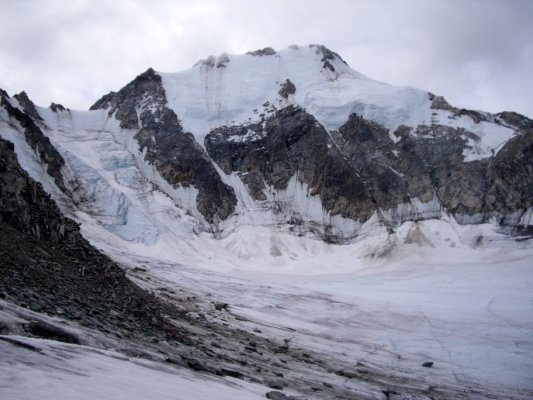
Peak Pobeda, Sakha, Russia

No	Peak	Country	Elevation (m)	Prominence (m)	Col (m)
1	Pik Pobeda	Russia	3,003	2,443	560
2	Ledyanaya	Russia	2,453	2,337	116
3	Mus-Khaya	Russia	2,959	1,929	1030
4	HP Moma Range	Russia	2,480	1,760	720
5	Gora Chen	Russia	2,690	1,740	950
6	HP Orulgan	Russia	2,409	1,690	719
7	HP Saltag-Tas	Russia	2,021	1,622	399
8	Khakandya	Russia	2,615	1,545	1070
9	HP Arga-Tas	Russia	2,400	1,510	890

== Kamchatka ==
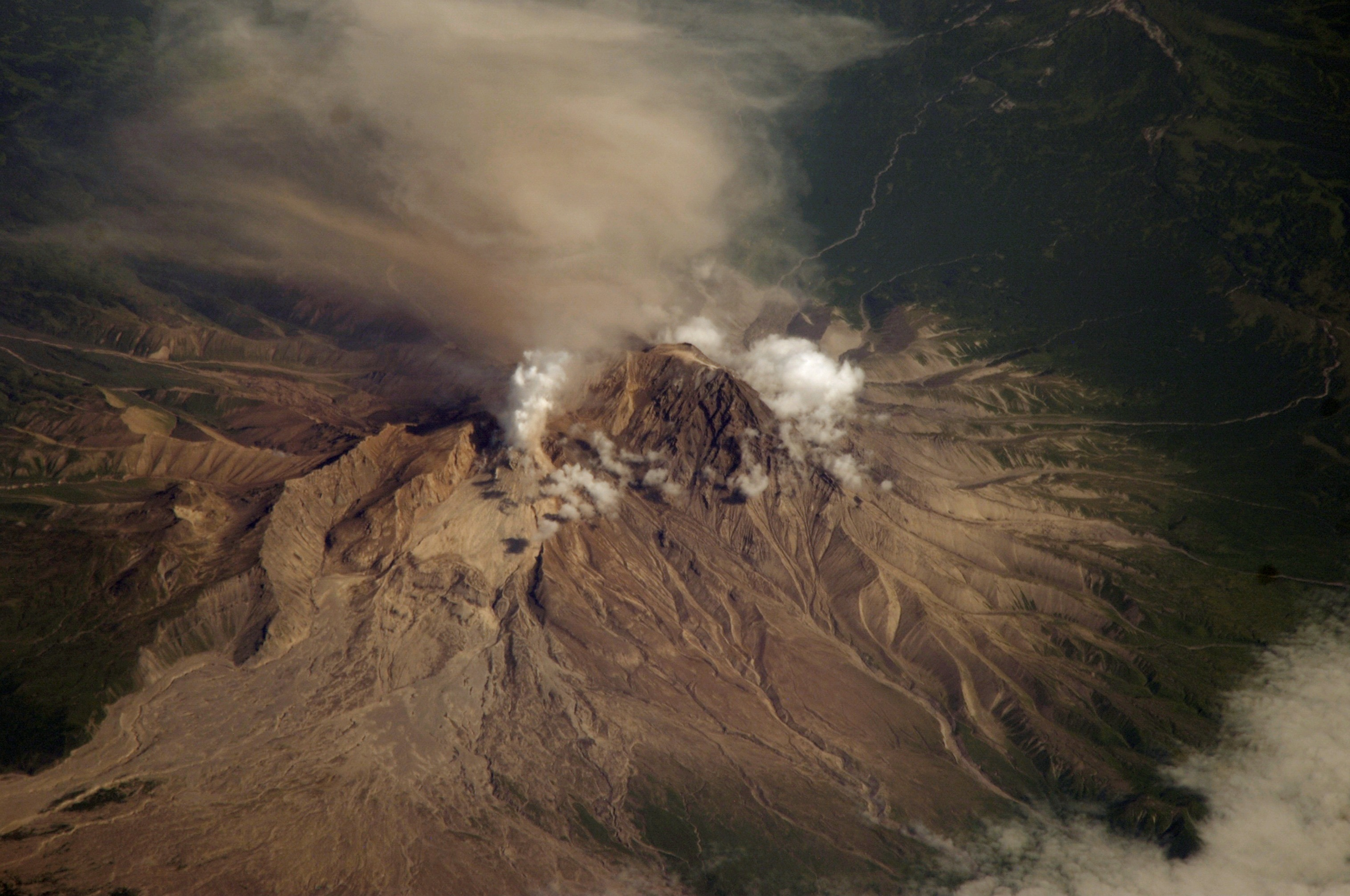
Shiveluch, Russia

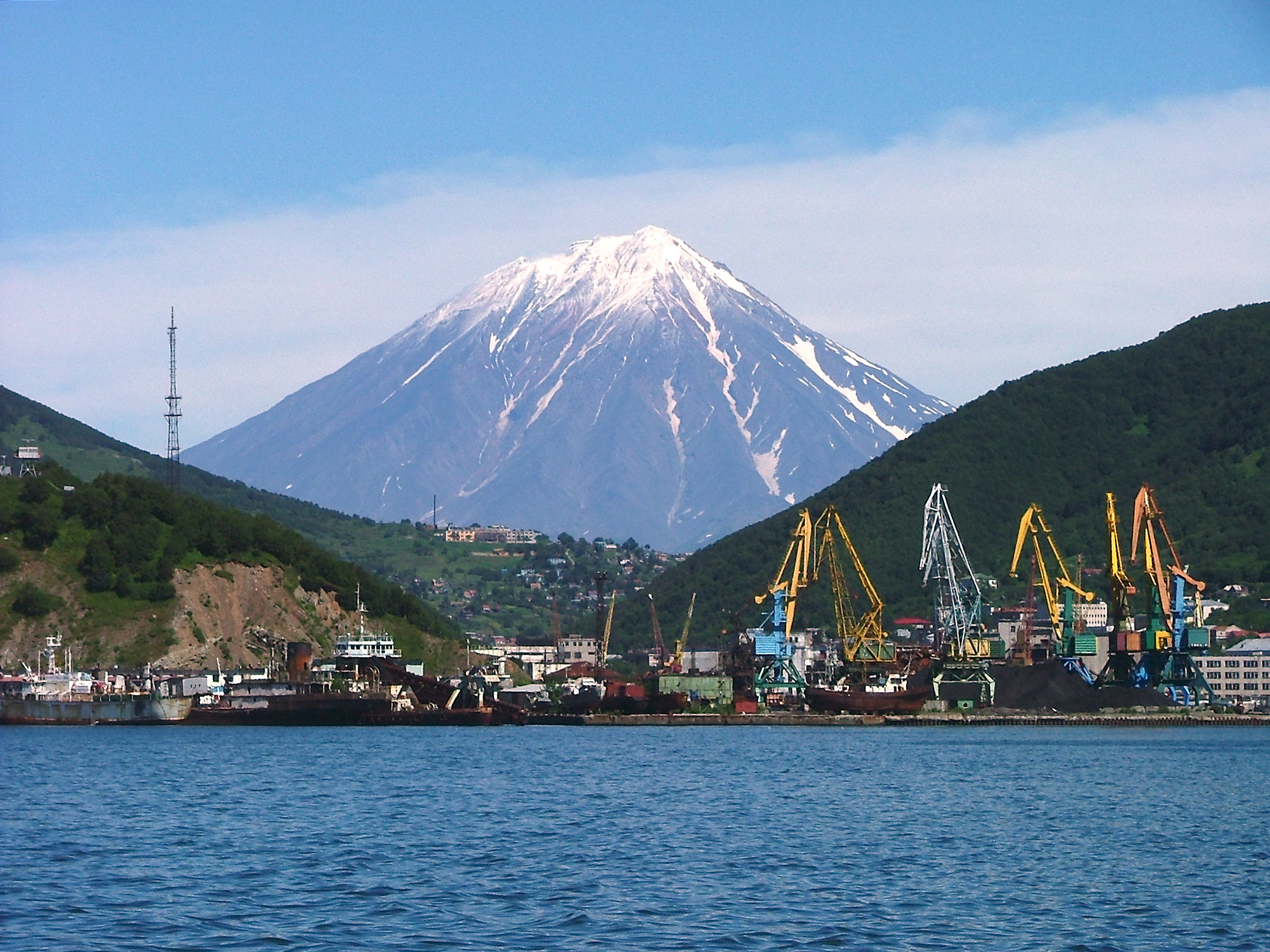
Koryaksky, Russia

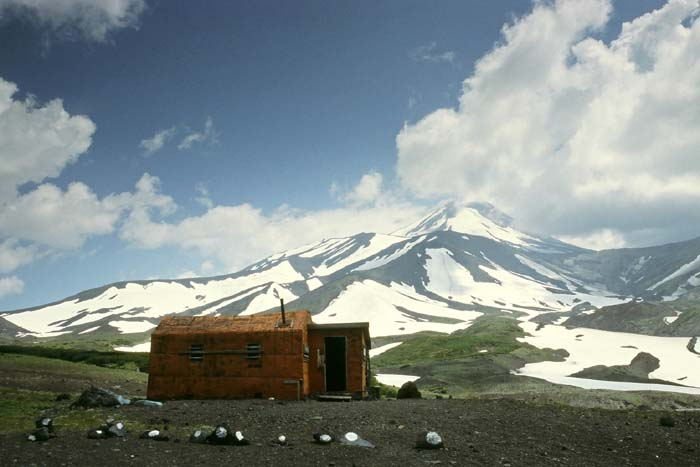
Avachinsky, Russia

No	Peak	Country	Elevation (m)	Prominence (m)	Col (m)
1	Klyuchevskaya Sopka	Russia	4,750	4,649	101
2	Shiveluch	Russia	3,307	3,168	139
3	Ichinsky	Russia	3,607	3,125	482
4	Koryaksky	Russia	3,456	2,999	457
5	Kronotsky	Russia	3,527	2,736	791
6	Zhupanovsky	Russia	2,923	2,210	713
7	Ostry Tolbachik	Russia	3,672	2,190	1482
8	Opala	Russia	2,460	2,070	390
9	Kambalny	Russia	2,161	1,970	191
10	Khuvkhoitun	Russia	2,616	1,920	696
11	Alney-Chashakondzha	Russia	2,598	1,825	773
12	Khodutka	Russia	2,089	1,810	279
13	Gamchen	Russia	2,577	1,750	827
14	Mutnovsky	Russia	2,322	1,750	572
15	Zheltovsky	Russia	1,957	1,730	227
16	Udina	Russia	2,920	1,630	1290
17	Bakening	Russia	2,276	1,610	666
18	Vilyuchik	Russia	2,173	1,610	563
19	Zimin volcano	Russia	3,080	1,570	1510
20	Avachinsky	Russia	2,741	1,550	1191

== Kuril Islands ==
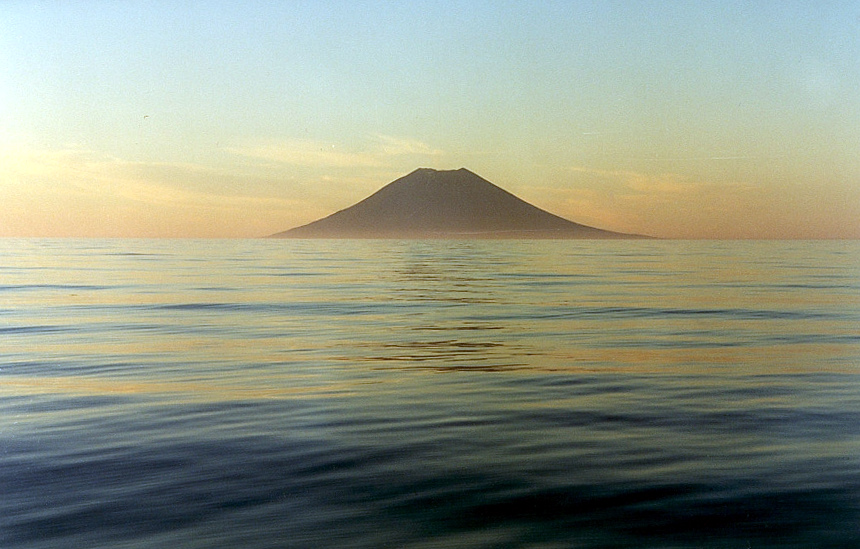
Vulkan Alaid, Russia

No	Peak	Country	Elevation (m)	Prominence (m)	Col (m)
1	Vulkan Alaid	Russia (Atlasov Island)	2,339	2,339	0
2	Tyatya 爺爺岳	Russia (Kunashiri Island 国後島)	1,819	1,819	0
3	Chikurachki	Russia (Paramushir)	1,816	1,816	0
4	Stokap/単冠山	Russia (Iturup/Etorofu 択捉島)	1,634	1,634	0
5	Fuss Peak	Russia (Paramushir)	1,772	1,630	142
6	Bogdan Khmelnitskiy	Russia (Iturup/Etorofu 択捉島)	1,585	1,550	35
7	Milne Volcano	Russia (Simushir)	1,539	1,539	0

== Korea and Manchuria ==
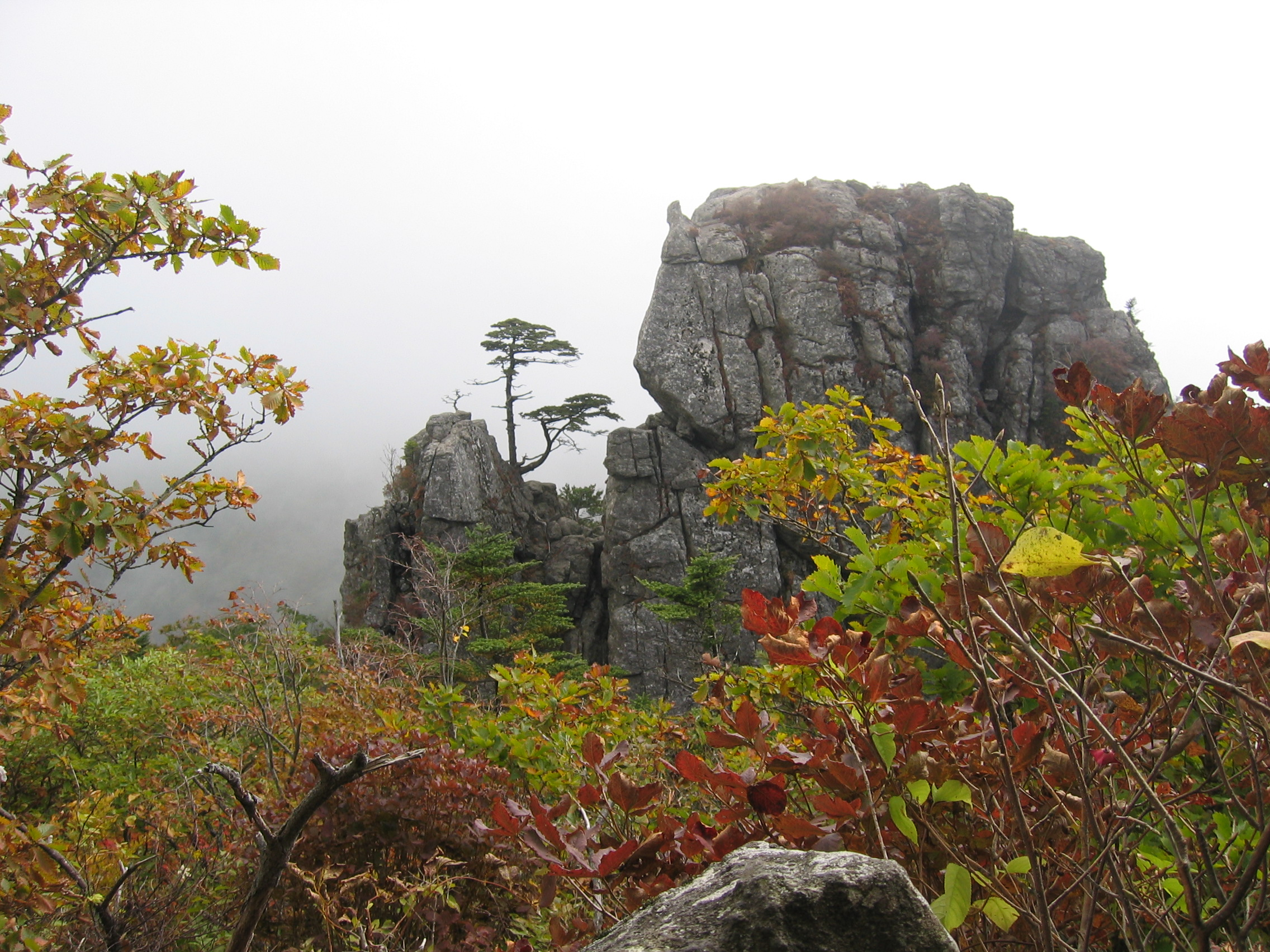
Jirisan, South Korea

No	Peak	Country	Elevation (m)	Prominence (m)	Col (m)
1	Baekdu Mountain	North Korea / China	2,744	2,593	151
2	Hallasan	South Korea (Jeju-do)	1,947	1,947	0
3	Jirisan	South Korea	1,915	1,696	219

== Sources ==
- List - Kamchatka & Kurils
- List - Siberia
- Map
