= Tolmachyov =

Tolmachyov, Tolmachov or Tolmachev (Russian: Толмачёв) feminine: Tolmachyova or Tolmacheva is a Russian patronymic surname meaning "son of tolmach", where "tolmach" (толмач) is an archaic Russian word for "interpreter".

- Aleksandr Tolmachyov (disambiguation), multiple persons
- Anastasia Tolmacheva, Russia-born Romanian biathlete
- Dmitri Tolmachyov (born 1996), Russian football player
- Nikolay Tolmachyov
- Oleg Tolmachev (1919–2008), Soviet ice hockey player and coach
- Tatyana Tolmachova (1907–1998), Soviet figure skater and coach
- Viktor Tolmachev
- Vitaliy Tolmachov
- Vladimir Tolmachyov (footballer) (born 1996), Russian football player
- Vladimir Tolmachyov (politician) (1887–1937), Soviet politician and statesman
- Tolmachevy Sisters, Avastasiya and Maria, Russian identical twins and actresses

== See also ==
- Tolmach
