= Decade Volcanoes =

Set of volcanoes considered especially dangerous

Map of the 16 Decade Volcanoes

The Decade Volcanoes are 16 volcanoes identified by the International Association of Volcanology and Chemistry of the Earth's Interior (IAVCEI) as being worthy of particular study in light of their history of large, destructive eruptions and proximity to densely populated areas. The Decade Volcanoes project encourages studies and public-awareness activities at these volcanoes, with the aim of achieving a better understanding of the volcanoes and the dangers they present, and thus being able to reduce the severity of natural disasters.

Decade Volcanoes are named as such because the project was initiated in the 1990s as part of the United Nations–sponsored International Decade for Natural Disaster Reduction.

A volcano may be designated a Decade Volcano if it exhibits more than one volcanic hazard (people living near the Decade Volcanoes may experience tephra fall, pyroclastic flows, lava flows, lahars, volcanic edifice instability and lava dome collapse); shows recent geological activity; is located in a densely populated area (eruptions at any of the Decade Volcanoes may threaten tens or hundreds of thousands of people, and therefore mitigating eruption hazards at these volcanoes is crucial); is politically and physically accessible for study; and there is local support for the work.

== Aims of the program ==
The general approach of Decade Volcano projects has been to convene a planning workshop, identify the major strengths and weaknesses of risk mitigation at each volcano, and to plan how to address the weaknesses identified. One of the difficulties faced in mitigating hazards at volcanoes is ensuring that geoscientists and those who will enact the mitigation measures communicate adequately with each other, and the Decade Volcano program has attempted to ensure this by making sure both groups are well represented at Decade Volcano workshops.

== Funding ==
Hopes that United Nations funding might be available for Decade Volcano projects did not come to fruition, and funding was sought instead from a variety of sources. For example, Mexican scientific and civil defence bodies funded work at Colima, principally for Mexican scientists but also for a few foreign colleagues; major bilateral French-Indonesian and German-Indonesian programs were initiated at Merapi; and the European Union has provided funding for many of the studies carried out at European volcanoes.

One particular activity that has not been funded—because it typically is not allowable under most national or bilateral funding—is the exchange of scientists and civil defence leaders between the various Decade Volcano projects of developing countries; for example, between the Philippines and Indonesia, or between Mexico, Guatemala, and Colombia, or across the Pacific and Atlantic. Often, scientists and civil defence leaders from developing countries can relate better to each other's experiences than they can to the experience of counterparts from industrialized countries. Also, civil defence leaders who have experienced volcanic crises are far more credible witnesses, in the eyes of local civil defence leaders, than either local or visiting scientists might be.

== Achievements ==
Since it was initiated, the Decade Volcano program has achieved a number of successes in predicting volcanic events and mitigating disasters. One of the most notable was the successful diversion of a lava flow and blanket at Mount Etna in 1992. The flow was threatening the town of Zafferana, and had overwhelmed several barriers placed perpendicular to its flow down a valley. Scientists and civil defence leaders decided to try to dam the flow higher up, and did so by dropping large concrete blocks into a skylight in a lava tube which was feeding the flow. The flow subsequently stopped short of Zafferana.

The program has significantly increased what is known about the Decade Volcanoes, some of which were very poorly studied before being designated. The eruptive history of Galeras volcano is now much better established than previously, and at Taal Volcano the importance of water in driving its explosive eruptions has come to light.

Measures which have been taken to mitigate disasters which might be caused by future eruptions include a new law in the vicinity of Mount Rainier, requiring assessment of geological hazards before any new developments; limitations on high density housing developments in the Taal Caldera; and the development of an evacuation plan for parts of Naples which might be affected in the event of an eruption at Vesuvius.

== Problems ==
Although studies at many Decade Volcanoes have clearly reduced the risks faced by nearby settlements, eruptions at some of the Decade Volcanoes have demonstrated the difficulties faced by the program. Eruptions at Japan's Mount Unzen, which began shortly before it was designated a Decade Volcano, were heavily monitored. Despite this, a large pyroclastic flow killed 43 people, including three volcanologists.

Later, a 1993 Decade Volcano conference in the city of Pasto, Colombia, ended in disaster when several attending scientists mounted an impromptu expedition to the crater of Galeras. An unexpected eruption while they were at the summit killed six scientists and three tourists.

Civil unrest in the vicinity of several of the Decade Volcanoes has also interfered with the program. The civil war in Guatemala affected studies of Volcán Santa María until a ceasefire was called in 1996, while ongoing civil war in the Democratic Republic of the Congo has hampered studies of Nyiragongo volcano. More generally, scarce resources for volcano studies have led to programs competing for limited funding.

== Volcanoes selected ==
The following volcanoes were selected as the 16 current Decade Volcanoes:

Volcano	Elevation	Region	Country	Population at risk of lava/lahar /ash flow	Last known eruption	Affected Region/Why a Decade Volcano
Avachinsky-Koryaksky	2,741 m (8,993 ft) (Avachinsky); 3,456 m (11,339 ft) (Koryaksky)	Kamchatka	Russia	179,367 (2021 est)	2008 (Avachinsky), 2009 (Koryaksky)	Proximity of volcano to Petropavlovsk-Kamchatsky.
Volcán de Colima	4,260 m (13,976 ft)	Colima/ Jalisco	Mexico	770,000 (2019 est)	2019	Whole of Colima State
Galeras	4,276 m (14,029 ft)	Nariño	Colombia	1,630,000 (2018 est)	2014	Whole of Nariño Department
Mauna Loa	4,169 m (13,678 ft)	Hawaii	United States	?	2022	Largest of the active shield volcanoes in the Hawaiian Islands. Lower flanks populated in multiple directions, but most dangerous to the city of Hilo
Mount Etna	3,403 m (11,165 ft)	Sicily	Italy	1,100,000	2026	Whole metropolitan city of Catania in general due to air pollution and ash clouds. Capable of lava bombs and violent VEI 3 eruptions.
Mount Merapi	2,968 m (9,738 ft)	Central Java/ Special Region of Yogyakarta	Indonesia	5,050,000 (2019 est)	2024	Whole of Special Region of Yogyakarta, and Klaten Regency/Frequent small to medium eruptions occur every two to three years
Mount Nyiragongo	3,470 m (11,385 ft)	North Kivu	Democratic Republic of the Congo	2,000,000	2021 May 22, VEI 0-2.	No census for decades in sprawling city of Goma. Lava known to be highly fluid and fast-moving. May 2021 eruption killed 32 people and injured thousands. Currently not monitored for seismic activity.
Mount Rainier	4,392 m (14,409 ft)	Washington	United States	795,000 (2010)	1894-1895, (minor phreatic)	Whole of Pierce County, and potentially as far as Seattle. Mount Rainier is one of the most glaciated stratovolcanoes in the Cascade Volcanic Arc. Capable of setting off massive lahars, as evidenced in the valleys below it in all directions. Known to have had both landslide type lahars or snowmelt lahars. Considered by USGS to be one of the most dangerous volcanoes in the USA.
Mount Vesuvius	1,281 m (4,203 ft)	Campania	Italy	3,085,000	1944 March 17-23, VEI 3	Whole metropolitan city of Naples. Very long record of destroying cities nearby, capable of large pyroclastic flows. Destroyed Herculaneum and Pompeii in 79 AD, VEI 5 eruption.
Mount Unzen	1,473 m (4,833 ft)	Nagasaki/ Kumamoto	Japan	1,320,000 (2019 est)	1995	Nagasaki Prefecture, tsunami potential
Sakurajima	1,117 m (3,665 ft)	Kagoshima	Japan	1,470,000 (2019 est)	2025 November 16	Whole of Kagoshima Prefecture except Amami Islands
Santa María	3,772 m (12,375 ft)	Quetzaltenango	Guatemala	1,127,000 (2018 est)	2013 August 23	Whole of Quetzaltenango and Retalhuleu Departments
Santorini (Thera)	367 m (1,204 ft)	South Aegean	Greece	?	1950	Entire island of Santorini once much larger. In 1646 BCE, Santorini, then called Thera, had an eruption more powerful than the 1880s eruption at Krakatoa. Currently what was one island is now three with caldera hidden below surface. Risk of tsunami; record of causing one in 1646 BCE.
Taal Volcano	311 m (1,020 ft)	Calabarzon	Philippines	24,393,000 (2020 est)	2026	Whole areas of Batangas, Cavite, Metro Manila and Laguna
Teide	3,715 m (12,188 ft)	Canary Islands	Spain	900,000	1909	Tenerife, tsunami potential
Ulawun	2,334 m (7,657 ft)	East New Britain / West New Britain	Papua New Guinea	?	2023 November	?

- Note: Population at risk of lava/lahar/ash flows during eruption, not including potential tsunami nor distant ashfall

=== Gallery ===
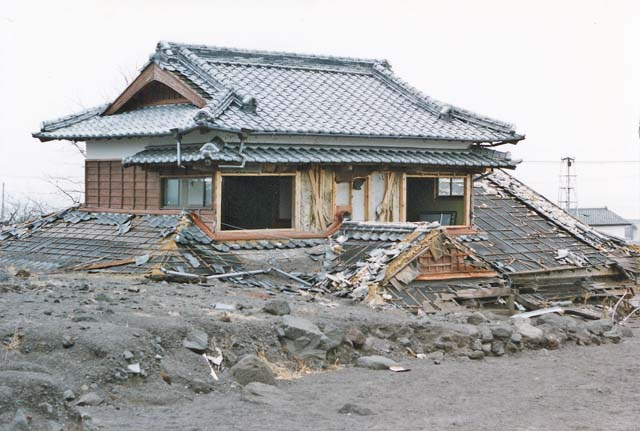
Building destroyed by eruptions at Mount Unzen, Japan

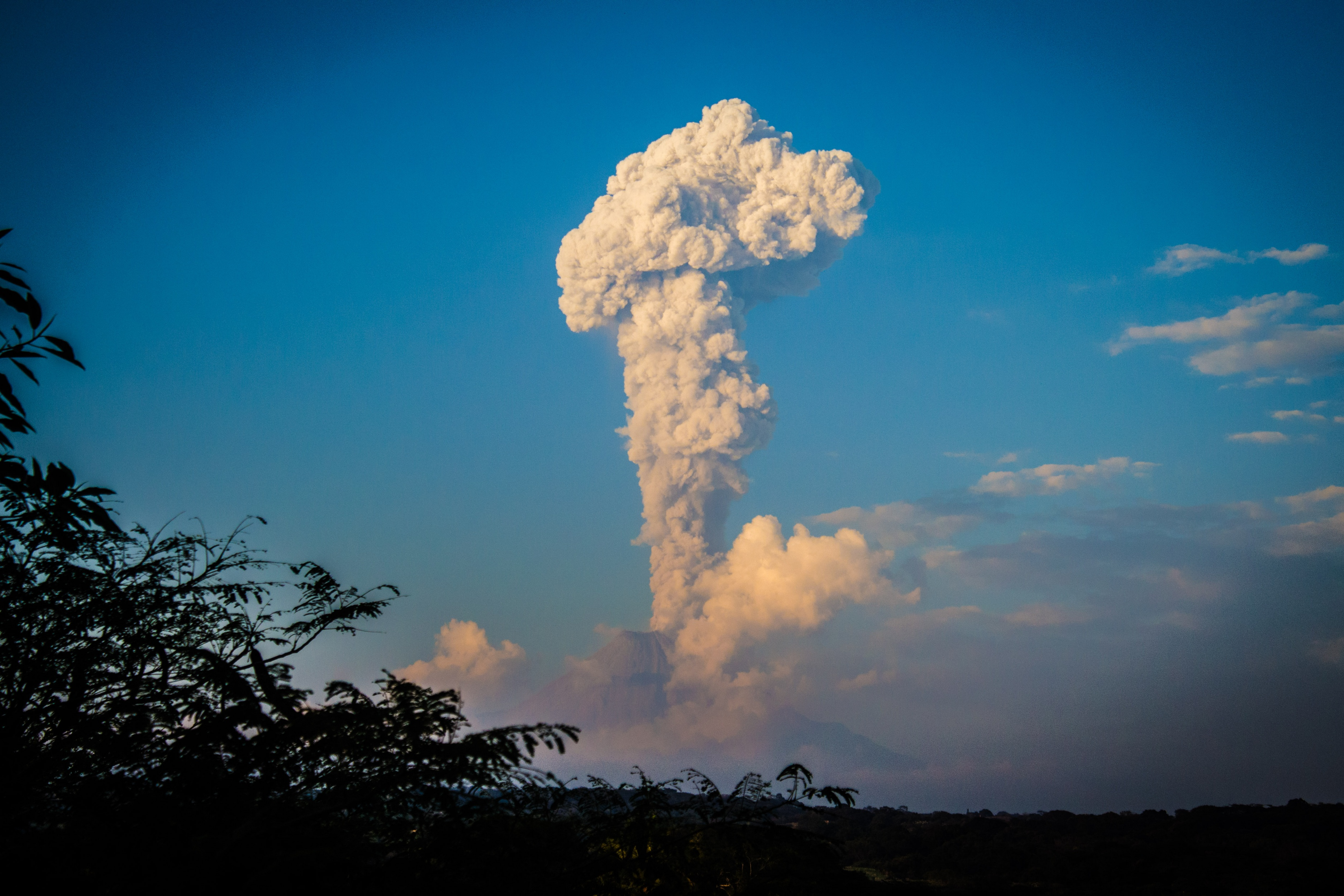
Colima Volcano eruption column, December 2016

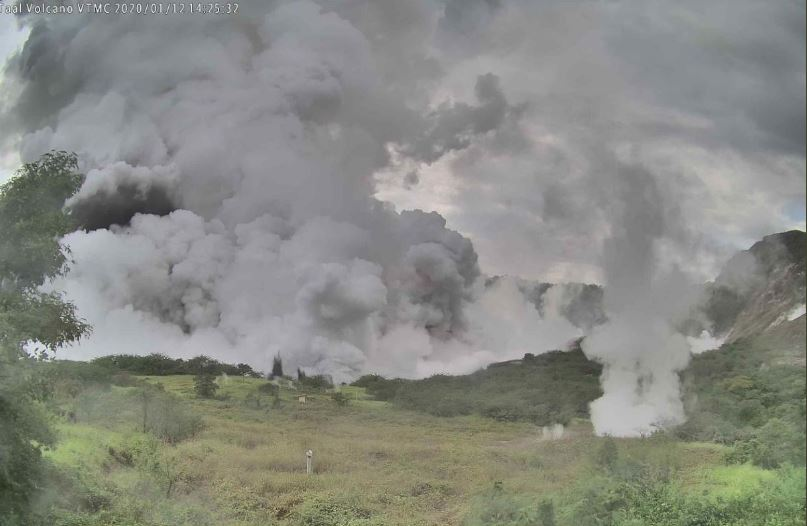
Phreatic explosion captured at the Main Crater of Taal Volcano in January 2020, from an installed IP camera of the Philippine Institute of Volcanology and Seismology (PHIVOLCS) monitoring the volcano.

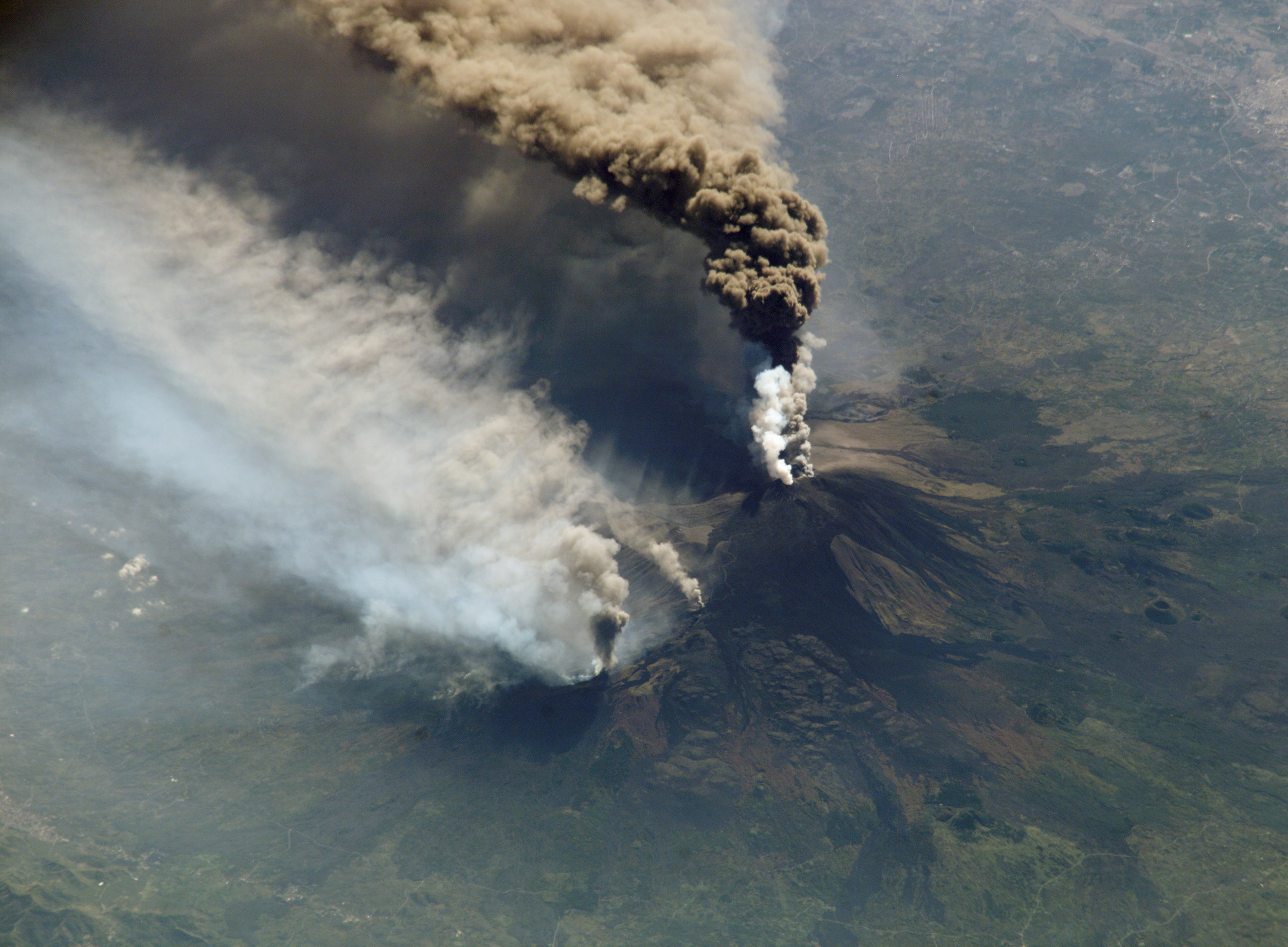
A large eruption at Mount Etna, photographed from the International Space Station

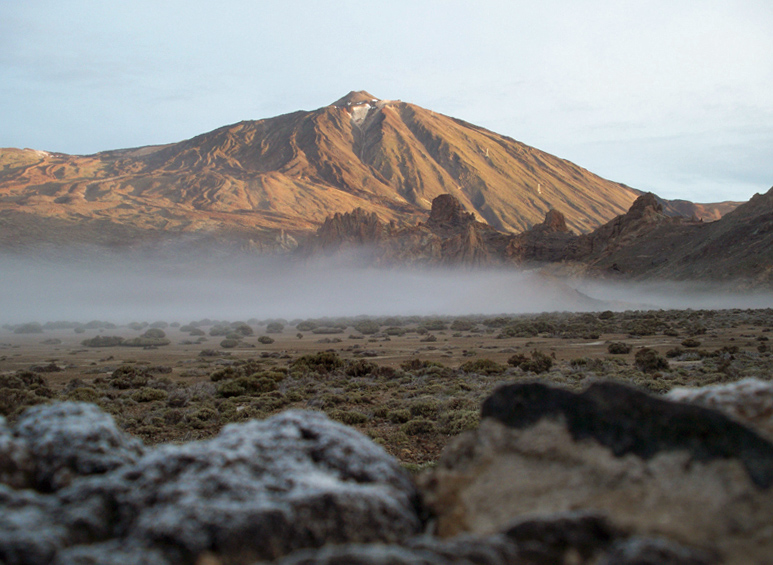
Teide, Tenerife (Spain).

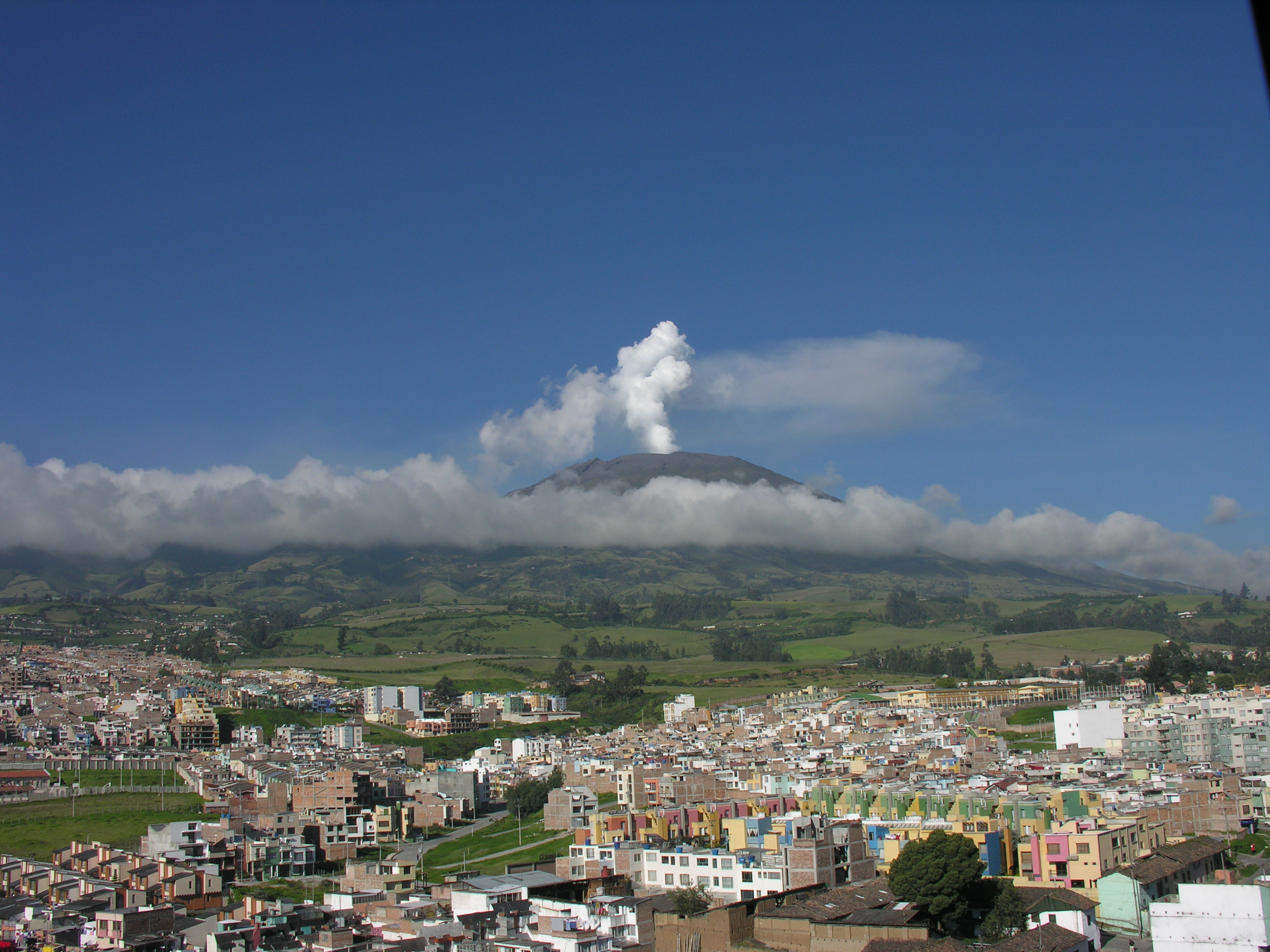
Galeras, Nariño, (Colombia).

== See also ==
- Timeline of volcanism on Earth
