= Aleksandr Tolmachyov =

Aleksandr Tolmachyov may refer to:

- Aleksandr Tolmachyov (botanist) (1903–1979), Soviet botanist
- Aleksandr Tolmachyov (journalist), Russian journalist
- Aleksandr Tolmachyov (politician)
