= Dzenzursky =

Stratovolcano in southern Kamchatka

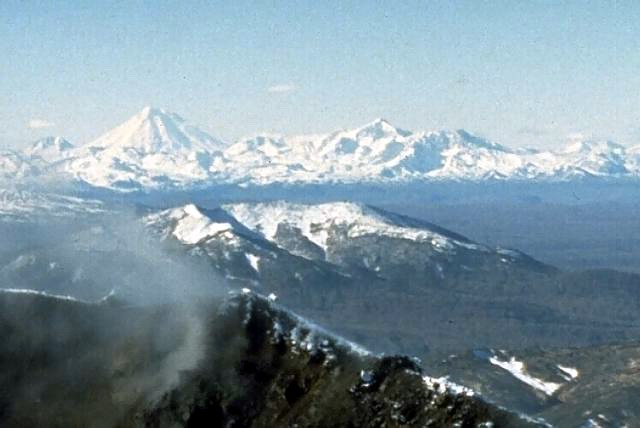
- The broad snow-capped Dzenzursky massif is seen here from the NE with the rim of the summit crater of Karymsky volcano in the foreground and conical Koryaksky volcano in the left distance.

Highest point
- Elevation: 2,285 m (7,497 ft)
- Coordinates: 53.637°N 158.922°E

Geography
- Location within Kamchatka Krai
- Location: Kamchatka, Russia
- Parent range: Eastern Range

Geology
- Mountain type: Compound volcano/Stratovolcano
- Last eruption: Unknown

Dzenzursky (Russian: Дзензурский) is a stratovolcano located in the southern part of the Kamchatka Peninsula, Russia.

== See also ==
- List of volcanoes in Russia
