= Tolmachevo =

Tolmachevo (Russian: Толмачево) is the name of several inhabited localities in Russia.

== Urban localities ==
- Tolmachevo, Leningrad Oblast, an urban-type settlement under the administrative jurisdiction of Tolmachevskoye Settlement Municipal Formation in Luzhsky District of Leningrad Oblast

== Rural localities ==
- Tolmachevo, Bryansk Oblast, a selo in Snezhsky Selsoviet of Bryansky District of Bryansk Oblast
- Tolmachevo, Kaluga Oblast, a village in Tarussky District of Kaluga Oblast
- Tolmachevo, Brezhnevsky Selsoviet, Kursky District, Kursk Oblast, a village in Brezhnevsky Selsoviet of Kursky District of Kursk Oblast
- Tolmachevo, Lebyazhensky Selsoviet, Kursky District, Kursk Oblast, a village in Lebyazhensky Selsoviet of Kursky District of Kursk Oblast
- Tolmachevo, Moscow Oblast, a village in Nikonovskoye Rural Settlement of Ramensky District of Moscow Oblast
- Tolmachevo, Nizhny Novgorod Oblast, a selo in Prokoshevsky Selsoviet of Kstovsky District of Nizhny Novgorod Oblast
- Tolmachevo, Novosibirsk Oblast, a selo in Novosibirsky District of Novosibirsk Oblast
- Tolmachevo, Mtsensky District, Oryol Oblast, a village in Anikanovsky Selsoviet of Mtsensky District of Oryol Oblast
- Tolmachevo, Soskovsky District, Oryol Oblast, a village in Kirovsky Selsoviet of Soskovsky District of Oryol Oblast
- Tolmachevo, Sverdlovsk Oblast, a selo in Alapayevsky District of Sverdlovsk Oblast
- Tolmachevo, Tomsk Oblast, a selo in Parabelsky District of Tomsk Oblast
- Tolmachevo, Tver Oblast, a village in Pankovo Rural Settlement of Staritsky District of Tver Oblast
- Tolmachevo, Vladimir Oblast, a village in Alexandrovsky District of Vladimir Oblast
- Tolmachevo, Vologda Oblast, a village in Surkovsky Selsoviet of Cherepovetsky District of Vologda Oblast

== See also ==
- Tolmachyov (disambiguation)
