= Ostry =

Stratovolcano on the northern part of the Kamchatka peninsula

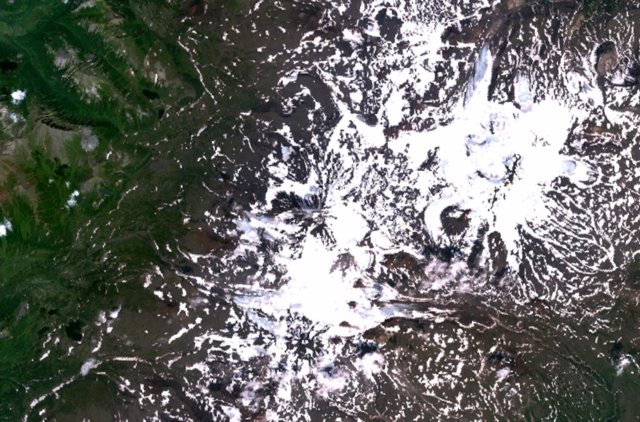
- Ostry volcano, NASA Landsat image, 2012.

Highest point
- Elevation: 2,552 m (8,373 ft)
- Coordinates: 58.18°N 160.82°E

Geography
- Location within Russia Location within Kamchatka Krai
- Location: Kamchatka, Russia
- Parent range: Sredinny Range

Geology
- Mountain type: Stratovolcano
- Last eruption: 2050 BCE (?)

Ostry (Russian: Острый) is a stratovolcano located in the northern part of the Kamchatka Peninsula, Russia. It comprises the higher Ostry volcano and the smaller Kutina volcano. Ostry is one of the highest peaks of Sredinny Range.

An unnamed 2,127-metre (6,978 ft) high cinder cone on the SW flank of Ostry, informally referred to as "Cone X," erupted about 4,000 years ago, producing a basaltic lava flow.

== See also ==
- List of volcanoes in Russia
