= Aleksandr Tolmachyov (journalist) =

Russian journalist

- Citizenship: Russia
- Occupations: Journalist, editor

Aleksandr Tolmachyov (1955—2020) was a Russian journalist who edits the magazine Upolnomochen Zayavit and the newspaper Pro Rostov. He was held in custody without trial from December 2011 to August 2013 after having criticized government authorities. In October 2014, he was found guilty of extortion and sentenced to nine years in a penal colony, despite a lack of evidence of guilt. He died a month and a half before the planned release. Tolmachyov is known in the Rostov region for denouncing judicial and political corruption and organized crime.

== Arrest ==
On December 20, 2011, he and two alleged accomplices were arrested in a libel case and charged with allegedly extorting one million rubles from a businessman in Novocherkassk. He was acquitted shortly thereafter, and then arrested again before the end of the month, also on charges of extortion involving “a number of entrepreneurs”. He was placed in solitary confinement. Thereafter, his detention was “extended month after month” until August 2013, when he was finally put on trial.

In early 2012, another extortion charge was leveled against him; in the spring of 2012, two more extortion charges were added, for a total of four.

On January 2, 2014, Reporters Without Borders (RSF) expressed concern over “the judicial harassment of journalists critical of the authorities in the southern city of Rostov-on-Don,” citing the cases of Tolmachyov, who had been in pre-trial detention for two years, and of another journalist, Sergei Reznik, who had just been sentenced to a penal colony.

On January 9, 2012, about 400 people gathered in Novocherkassk to protest his incarceration.

It was reported on April 4, 2013, that the investigation into his case had been completed. His lawyer, Sergey Karpov, asked for a dismissal of the case, saying that no proof of any crime had been presented. The request for dismissal was rejected.

== Trial and conviction ==
Tolmachev's trial began in August 2013. On October 29, 2014, the Kushchevskaya district court found Tolmachyov guilty and sentenced him to nine years in a penal colony. Tolmachyov appealed his verdict to the Krasnodar Regional Court.

== Award ==
On June 21, 2013, Tolmachyov was given an award by the Artyom Borovik charitable foundation in recognition of his articles about judicial corruption in the Rostov region.
