= Bliznetsy =

Bliznetsy Близнецы
- Village
- Location within Vladimir Oblast Location within Russia
- Coordinates: 56°01′N 39°45′E
- Country: Russia
- Region: Vladimir Oblast
- District: Petushinsky District
- Time zone: UTC+3:00

Bliznetsy (Russian: Близнецы) is a rural locality (a village) in Pekshinskoye Rural Settlement, Petushinsky District, Vladimir Oblast, Russia. The population was 11 as of 2010.

== Geography ==
Bliznetsy is located 30 km northeast of Petushki (the district's administrative centre) by road. Sukovatovo is the nearest rural locality.
