= Plosky =

Mountain in Kamchatka Peninsula, Russia

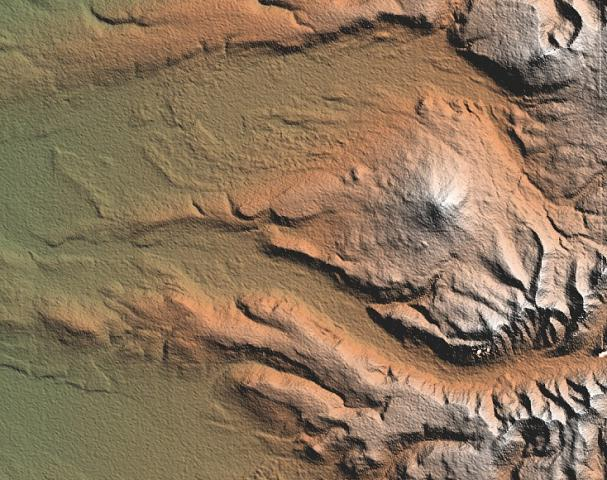
- Plosky is to the right of center in this NASA shuttle mission image.

Highest point
- Elevation: 1,255 m (4,117 ft)
- Coordinates: 57.83°N 160.25°E

Geography
- Location within Kamchatka Krai
- Location: Kamchatka, Russia
- Parent range: Sredinny Range

Geology
- Mountain type: Shield volcano
- Last eruption: Unknown

Plosky (Russian: Плоский, meaning "flat") is a shield volcano located in the northern part of Kamchatka Peninsula, Russia. It rises near the headwaters of Voyampolka River.

== See also ==
- List of volcanoes in Russia
