= Leutongey =

Mountain in Kamchatka Peninsula, Russia

- Location within Kamchatka Krai

Highest point
- Elevation: 1,318 m (4,324 ft)
- Coordinates: 57.30°N 159.83°E

Geography
- Location: Kamchatka, Russia
- Parent range: Sredinny Range

Geology
- Mountain type: Shield volcano
- Last eruption: Pleistocene age

Leutongey is an extinct shield volcano located in the northern part of Kamchatka Peninsula, Russia.

== See also ==
- List of volcanoes in Russia
