= Piip =

Family name

Piip is an Estonian surname. Notable people with the surname include:

- Ants Piip (1884–1942), Estonian lawyer, diplomat, and politician
- Boris Piip (1906–1966), Soviet volcanologist
