= Tolmach =

Tolmach is a Russian-language occupational surname: tolmach is an archaic term for "interpreter". Notable people with the surname include:

- Jane Tolmach (1921–2015), American politician
- Matt Tolmach (born 1964), American film producer
- Robin Tolmach Lakoff, American linguist

== See also ==
- Tolmachyov
