= Vilyuchik =

Stratovolcano in the southern part of the Kamchatka peninsula

- Vilyuchinsky
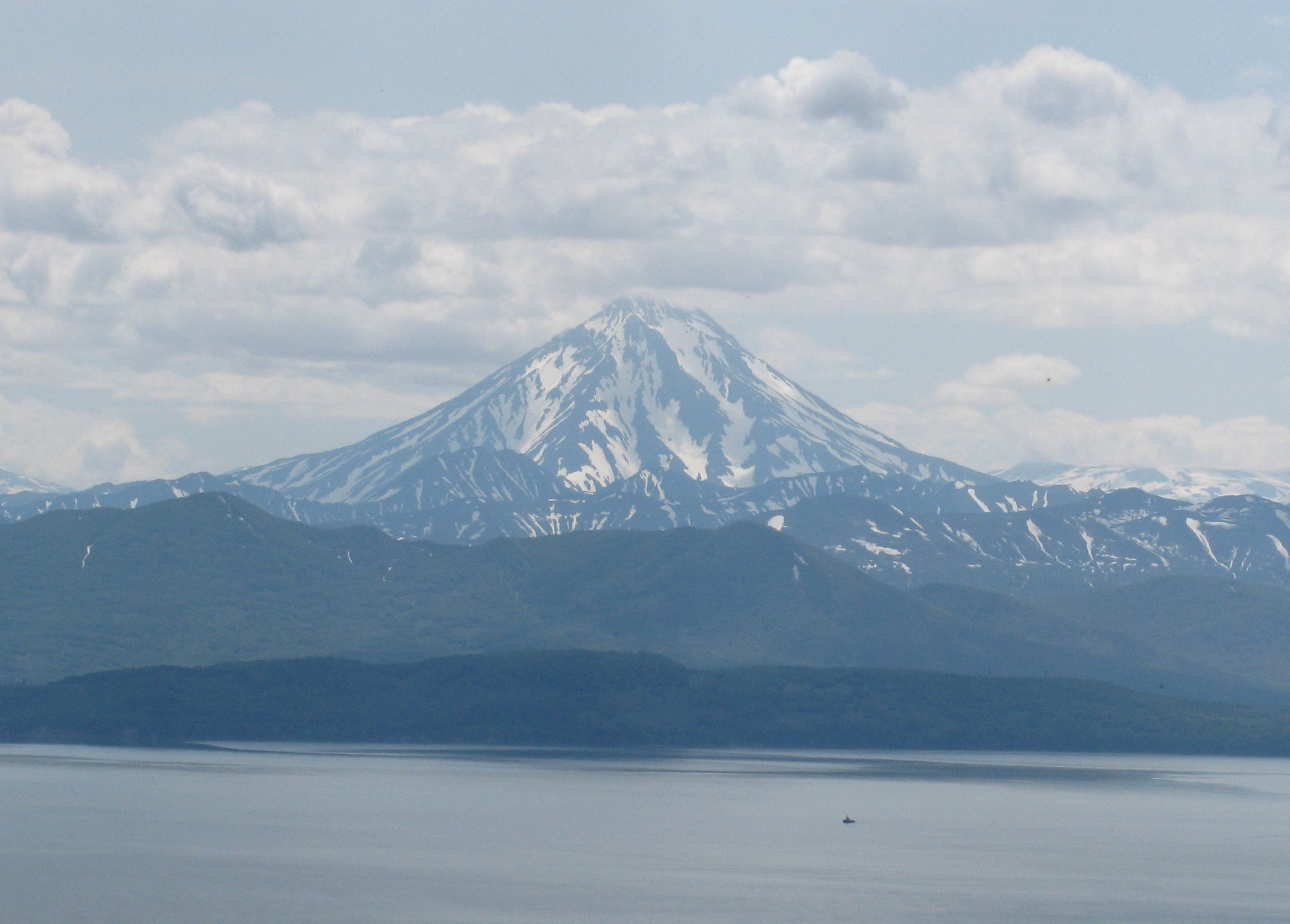

Highest point
- Elevation: 2,173 m (7,129 ft)
- Prominence: 1,610 m (5,280 ft)
- Listing: Ultra, Ribu; List of volcanoes by elevation
- Coordinates: 52°42′18″N 158°16′54″E

Geography
- Location within Kamchatka Krai Location within Russia
- Location: Kamchatka, Russia
- Parent range: Eastern Range

Geology
- Mountain type: Stratovolcano
- Last eruption: 8050 BCE ?

Vilyuchik, also known as Vilyuchinsky (Russian: Вилючинский вулкан) is a dormant stratovolcano in the southern part of the Kamchatka Peninsula, Russia. It is located about 30 kilometres (19 mi) SSW of the closed city of Vilyuchinsk.

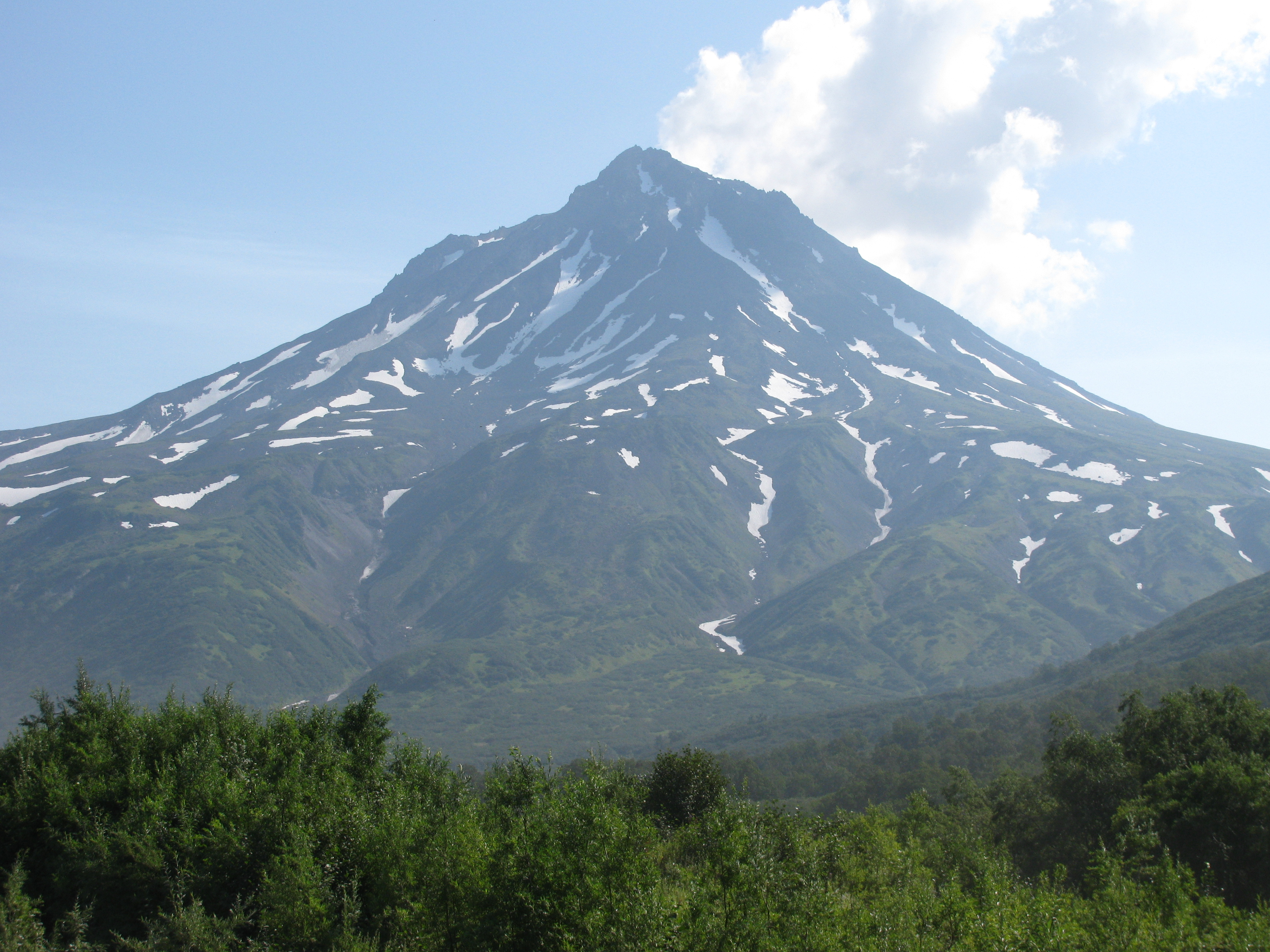
From east foot

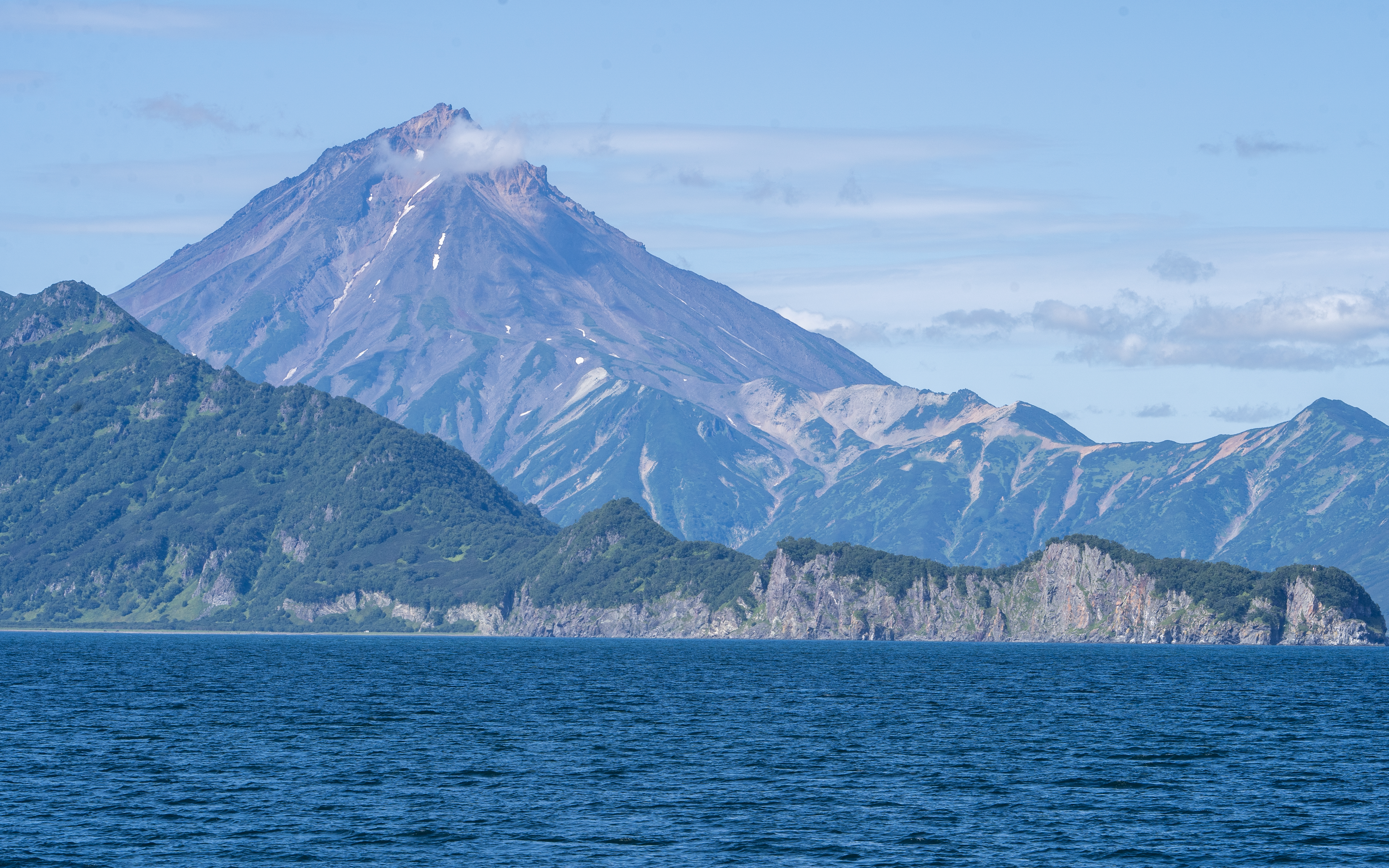
From southeast

== See also ==
- List of volcanoes in Russia
- List of ultras of Northeast Asia

== Sources ==
- "Vilyuchik". Global Volcanism Program. Smithsonian Institution.
- "Vulkan Vilyuchinsky, Russia". Peakbagger.com.
