= Ichinsky =

Large stratovolcano in central Kamchatka

Highest point
- Elevation: 3,607 m (11,834 ft)
- Prominence: 3,125 m (10,253 ft); Ranked 75th
- Listing: Ultra, Ribu
- Coordinates: 55°40′42″N 157°43′06″E

Geography
- Location within Kamchatka Krai
- Location: Kamchatka, Russia
- Parent range: Sredinny Range

Geology
- Rock age: Pleistocene–Holocene
- Mountain type: Stratovolcano
- Last eruption: 1740

Ichinsky (Russian: Ичинский вулкан or Ичинская сопка, Ichinskaya sopka) is a large stratovolcano located in the central part of the Kamchatka Peninsula, Russia. At 3,607 metres (11,834 ft), it is the highest peak of the Sredinny Range, the central range of the peninsula. Ichinsky is also among the largest volcanoes in Kamchatka, with a volume of about 450 cubic kilometres (110 cu mi).

The volcano is capped by a 3-by-5-kilometre (2 by 3 mi) summit caldera, within which rise two lava domes which are the highest peaks. The entire summit area is covered by a substantial ice cap, and several large glaciers descend the flanks of the cone. There is ongoing fumarolic activity within the caldera.

A dozen more dacite and rhyodacite lava domes are found on the flanks of the volcano below the caldera rim. Basaltic and dacitic lava flows extand form the lower flanks, some as long as 10–15 kilometres (6.2–9.3 mi).

== See also ==
- List of volcanoes in Russia
- List of ultras of Northeast Asia
