= Vitaliy Tolmachov =

Ukrainian footballer (born 1964)

Personal information
- Full name: Vitaliy Anatoliyovych Tolmachov
- Date of birth: 21 January 1964 (age 62)
- Place of birth: Zaporizhzhia, Ukrainian SSR
- Height: 1.83 m (6 ft 0 in)
- Position: Goalkeeper

Youth career
- Metalurh Zaporizhzhia

Senior career*
Years	Team	Apps	(Gls)
1982–1983	Metalurh Zaporizhzhia	0	(0)
1983	Bukovyna Chernivtsi	0	(0)
1984	Metalurh Zaporizhzhia	3	(0)
1987	Vorskla Poltava	14	(0)
1988–1989	Bukovyna Chernivtsi	19	(0)
1990–1991	Gomselmash Gomel	27	(0)
1991–1992	Mladost Končarevo		
1992–1993	Palić		
1993–1994	Spartak Subotica	2	(0)
1994–1996	Bačka Subotica		
1997	Kharchovyk Popivka	13	(0)
1998	Elektron Romny	1	(0)
- * Club domestic league appearances and goals

Vitaliy Anatoliyovych Tolmachov (Ukrainian: Віталій Анатолійович Толмачов; born 21 January 1964) is a Soviet and Ukrainian former footballer who played as a goalkeeper.

== Career ==
Born in Zaporizhzhia, Ukrainian SSR, Soviet Union, he started playing with FC Metalurh Zaporizhya youth team, and became part of the senior team in 1982. In 1983, he played with FSC Bukovyna Chernivtsi and then he returned to Metalurh and played with them in the 1984 Soviet Second League. After a spell with FC Vorskla Poltava in 1987, he returned to FSC Bukovyna Chernivtsi this time staying with them two seasons. Then in 1990 he joined FC Gomel, known back then as Gomselmash Gomel.

In 1991 with the fall of Soviet Union Tolmachov moves abroad to Serbia, back then part of FR Yugoslavia. First he played with a minor rural club FK Mladost Končarevo during 1991–92, and next season he moved to northern Serbia joining FK Palić. He then moved to FK Spartak Subotica and played with them in the 1993–94 First League of FR Yugoslavia. In summer 1994 he moved to another club from Subotica, FK Bačka 1901, the oldest club on the entire territory of former Yugoslavia.

After two seasons playing with Bačka, Tolmachov returned home, then already as independent Ukraine. During the season 1997–98 he played the first half-season with Pishtsevik Popovka, and the second with FC Elektron Romny.
