= Zhupanovsky =

Volcanic massif in southeastern Kamchatka, Russia

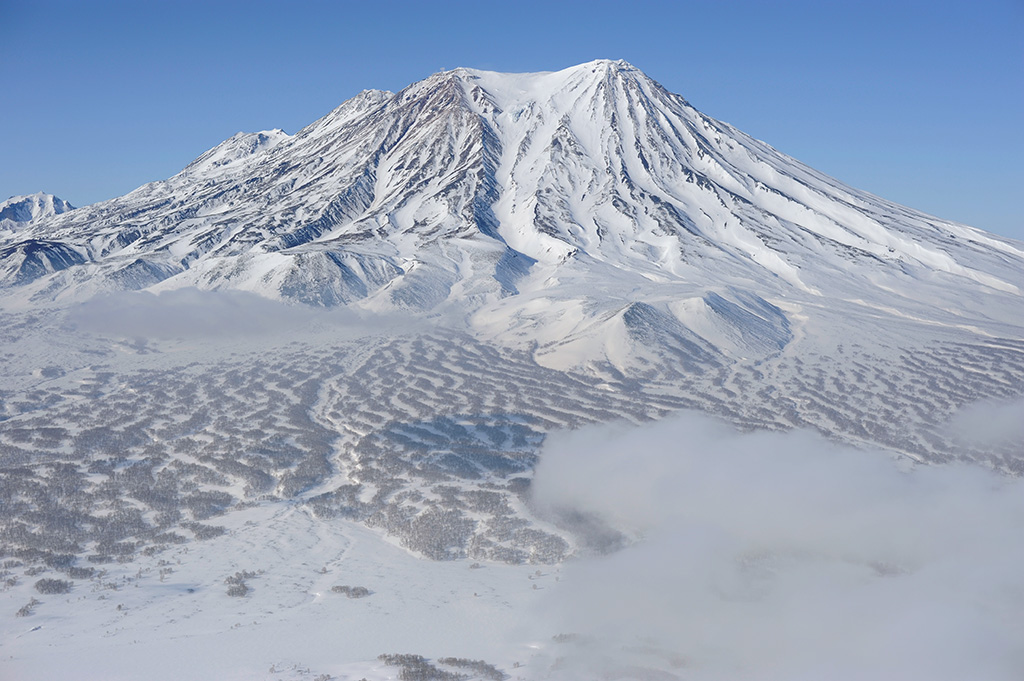

Highest point
- Elevation: 2,923 m (9,590 ft)
- Prominence: 2,210 m (7,250 ft)
- Listing: Ultra, Ribu
- Coordinates: 53°35′18″N 159°08′54″E

Geography
- Location within Far Eastern Federal District
- Location: Kamchatka, Russia
- Parent range: Eastern Range

Geology
- Mountain type: Compound volcano / Stratovolcanoes
- Last eruption: 2014 to 2018 (ongoing)

Zhupanovsky (Russian: Жупановский) is a volcanic massif located in the southeastern part of the Kamchatka Peninsula, Russia. It consists of four overlapping stratovolcanoes. After 54 years of inactivity, the volcano began erupting on 23 October 2013 and again in 2014, continuing nonstop into 2016.

== See also ==
- List of volcanoes in Russia
- List of ultras of Northeast Asia

== Other sources ==
- "Zhupanovsky". Global Volcanism Program. Smithsonian Institution.
