= Spokoyny (volcano) =

Stratovolcano in the northern part of the Sredinny range in Kamchatka

- Location within Russia

Highest point
- Elevation: 2,171 m (7,123 ft)
- Listing: List of volcanoes in Russia
- Coordinates: 58°8′0″N 160°49′0″E

Geography
- Parent range: Sredinny Range

Geology
- Mountain type: Volcano
- Last eruption: 3450 BCE (?)

Spokoyny (Russian: Спокойный) (also known as Kutina Russian: Кутина) is a stratovolcano in the northern part of the Sredinny Range in Russia's Kamchatka Peninsula. It forms part of the Volcanoes of Kamchatka Unesco world heritage site.

It was active during the early and mid-Holocene. Deposits from five eruptions during this interval have been documented, the last of which took place about 5400 years ago.

== See also ==
- List of volcanoes in Russia
