= Khodutka =

Stratovolcano in southern Kamchatka, Russia

- Ходуткинские Горы
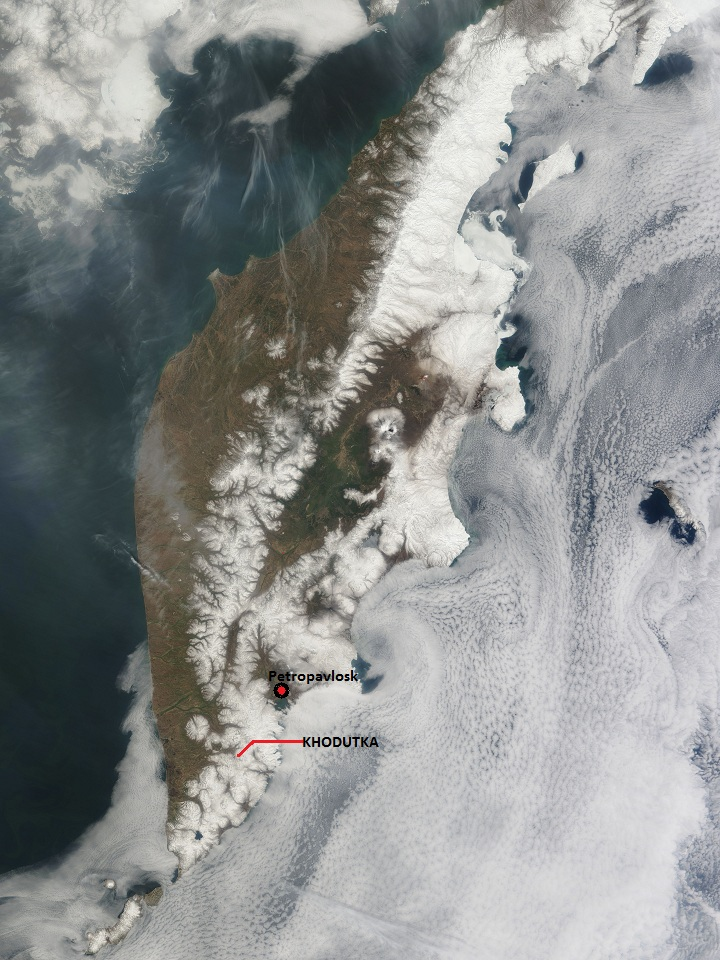
- Space image of Kamchatka Peninsula, showing location of Khodudka

Highest point
- Elevation: 2,089 m (6,854 ft)
- Prominence: 1,810 m (5,940 ft)
- Listing: Ultra, Ribu
- Coordinates: 52°03′45″N 157°42′36″E

Geography
- Location within Russia
- Location: Kamchatka, Russia
- Parent range: Eastern Range

Geology
- Mountain type: Stratovolcanoes
- Last eruption: 300 BCE ± 300 years

Khodutka (Russian: Ходутка), also known as Khodutkinskiye Gory (Russian: Ходуткинские Горы), is a stratovolcano located in the southern part of Kamchatka Peninsula, Russia.

It was formed from an older stratovolcano, known as Priemysh, between the late-Pleistocene and the early Holocene periods.

In about 800 BC, an eruption that was accompanied by small pyroclastic flows, and subsequent emplacement of lava flows and domes, deposited tephra throughout Southern Kamchatka, and formed a twin maar (Khodutkinsky maar) on the WNW slope of Khodutka.

Khodutka is one of a series of volcanoes that surround the city of Petropavlovsk-Kamchatsky, one of the oldest cities in the Far East

Volcanos, mountains, crater lakes and geyser valleys are recreational attractions in the area.

== See also ==
- List of volcanoes in Russia
- List of ultras of Northeast Asia
