= Gamchen =

Complex volcano on in southeastern Kamchatka

- Location within Kamchatka Krai

Highest point
- Elevation: 2,578 m (8,458 ft)
- Prominence: 1,750 m (5,740 ft)
- Listing: Ultra, Ribu
- Coordinates: 54°58′27″N 160°42′12″E

Geography
- Location: Kamchatka, Russia
- Parent range: Eastern Range

Geology
- Mountain type: Complex volcano
- Last eruption: 550 BC

Gamchen (Russian: Гамчен) is a complex volcano located in the southeastern part of the Kamchatka Peninsula, Russia. It is composed of four stratovolcanoes.

== See also ==
- List of volcanoes in Russia
- List of ultras of Northeast Asia
