= Tolmachyov, Belgorod Oblast =

Tolmachyov Толмачев
- Settlement
- Location within Belgorod Oblast Location within Russia
- Coordinates: 50°33′N 37°39′E
- Country: Russia
- Region: Belgorod Oblast
- District: Volokonovsky District
- Time zone: UTC+3:00

Tolmachyov (Russian: Толмачев) is a rural locality (a settlement) in Volokonovsky District, Belgorod Oblast, Russia. The population was 26 as of 2010. There is 1 street.

== Geography ==
Tolmachyov is located 26 km northwest of Volokonovka (the district's administrative centre) by road. Odintsov is the nearest rural locality.
