= Alney-Chashakondzha =

Volcanic mountain range in Northern Kamchatka

Alney–Chashakondzha
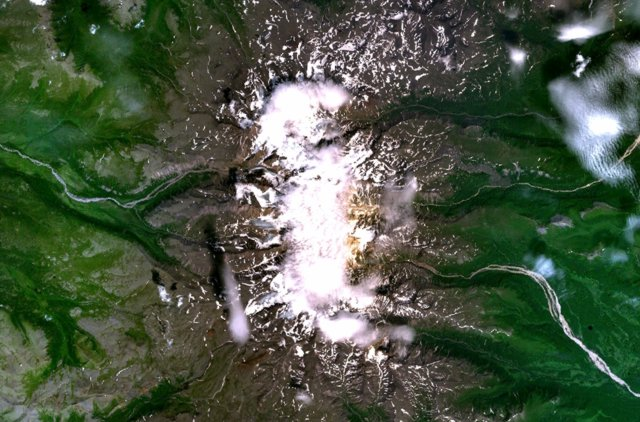

Highest point
- Elevation: 2,598 m (8,524 ft)
- Prominence: 1,825 m (5,988 ft)
- Listing: Ultra, Ribu
- Coordinates: 56°41′33″N 159°38′42″E

Geography
- Location within Kamchatka Krai
- Location: Kamchatka, Russia
- Parent range: Sredinny Range

Geology
- Rock age: Pliocene
- Mountain type: Stratovolcanoes
- Last eruption: approximately 1600 A.D.

Alney–Chashakondzha (Russian: Алней-Чашаконджа) is a volcanic complex located in the northern part of Kamchatka Peninsula, Russia. It consists of two stratovolcanoes: Alney (2598 m) and Chashakondzha (2526 m). Alney is one of the few large stratovolcanoes in the Sredinny Range known to have been active throughout the Holocene, with more than 30 documented pyroclastic deposits.

== See also ==
- List of volcanoes in Russia
- List of ultras of Northeast Asia
