= Avachinsky =

Active stratovolcano on the Kamchatka peninsula, Russia

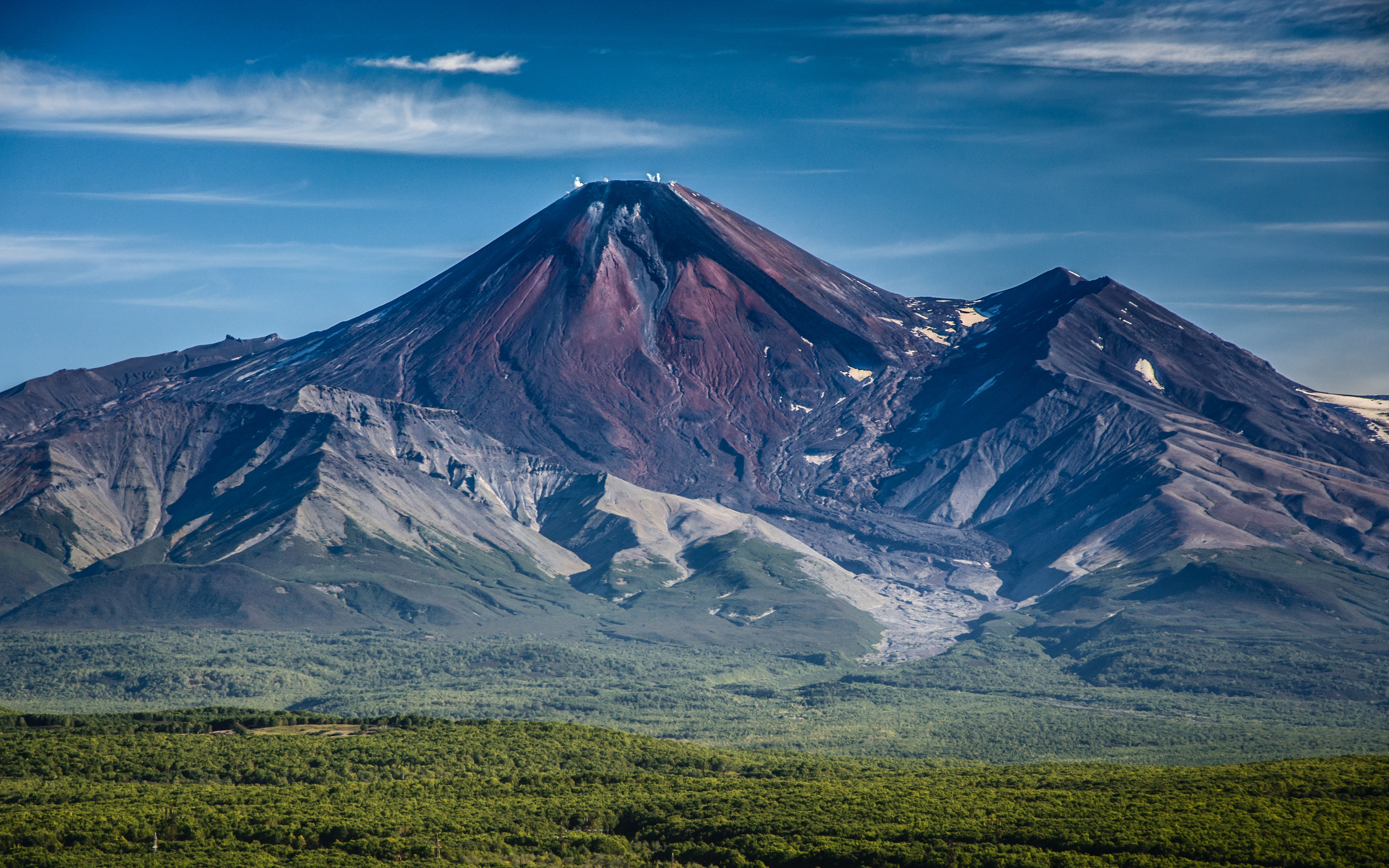
- Avachinsky Volcano in September 2014

Highest point
- Elevation: 2,741 m (8,993 ft)
- Prominence: 1,550 m (5,090 ft)
- Listing: Ultra, Ribu
- Coordinates: 53°15′18″N 158°49′48″E

Geography
- Location within Far Eastern Federal District
- Location: Kamchatka, Russia
- Parent range: Eastern Range

Geology
- Rock age: Pleistocene
- Mountain type: Stratovolcano
- Last eruption: October 5th, 2001

Climbing
- Easiest route: basic rock/snow climb

Avachinsky (also known as Avacha or Avacha Volcano or Avachinskaya Sopka) (Russian: Авачинская сопка, Авача) is an active stratovolcano in Russia. It is situated on the Kamchatka Peninsula in the Russian Far East. Avachinsky lies within sight of Petropavlovsk-Kamchatsky, the capital of Kamchatka Krai. Together with neighbouring Koryaksky volcano, it is considered a Decade Volcano, worthy of particular study in light of its history of explosive eruptions and proximity to populated areas.

== Geological history ==
Avachinsky lies on the Pacific Ring of Fire, at a point where the Pacific Plate is sliding underneath the Eurasian Plate at a rate of about 80 mm (3.1 in)/year. A wedge of mantle material lying between the subducting Pacific Plate and the overlying Eurasian Plate is the source of dynamic volcanism over the whole Kamchatka Peninsula.

The volcano is one of the most active volcanoes on the Kamchatka Peninsula, and began erupting in the middle to late Pleistocene era. It has a horseshoe-shaped caldera, which formed 30-40,000 years ago in a major landslide which covered an area of 500 km^{2} (193 sq mi) south of the volcano, underlying the city of Petropavlovsk-Kamchatsky. Reconstruction of a new cone inside the caldera occurred in two major eruption phases, 18,000 and 7,000 years ago.

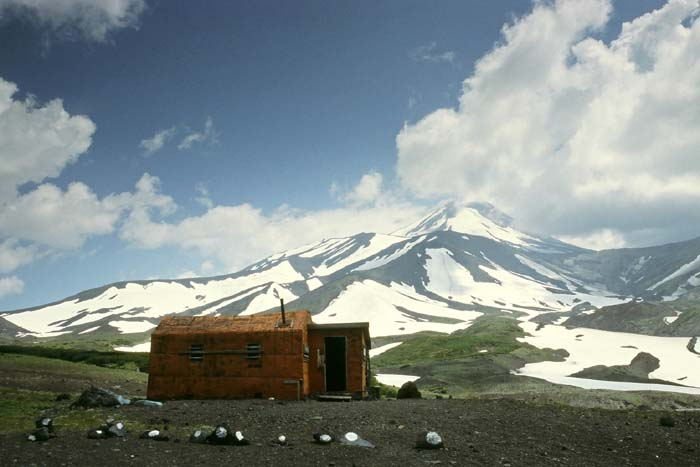
Seen from base camp.

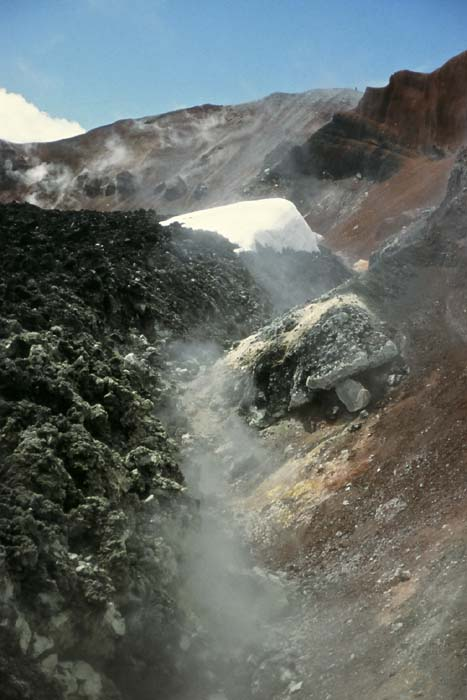
Avachinsky Summit.

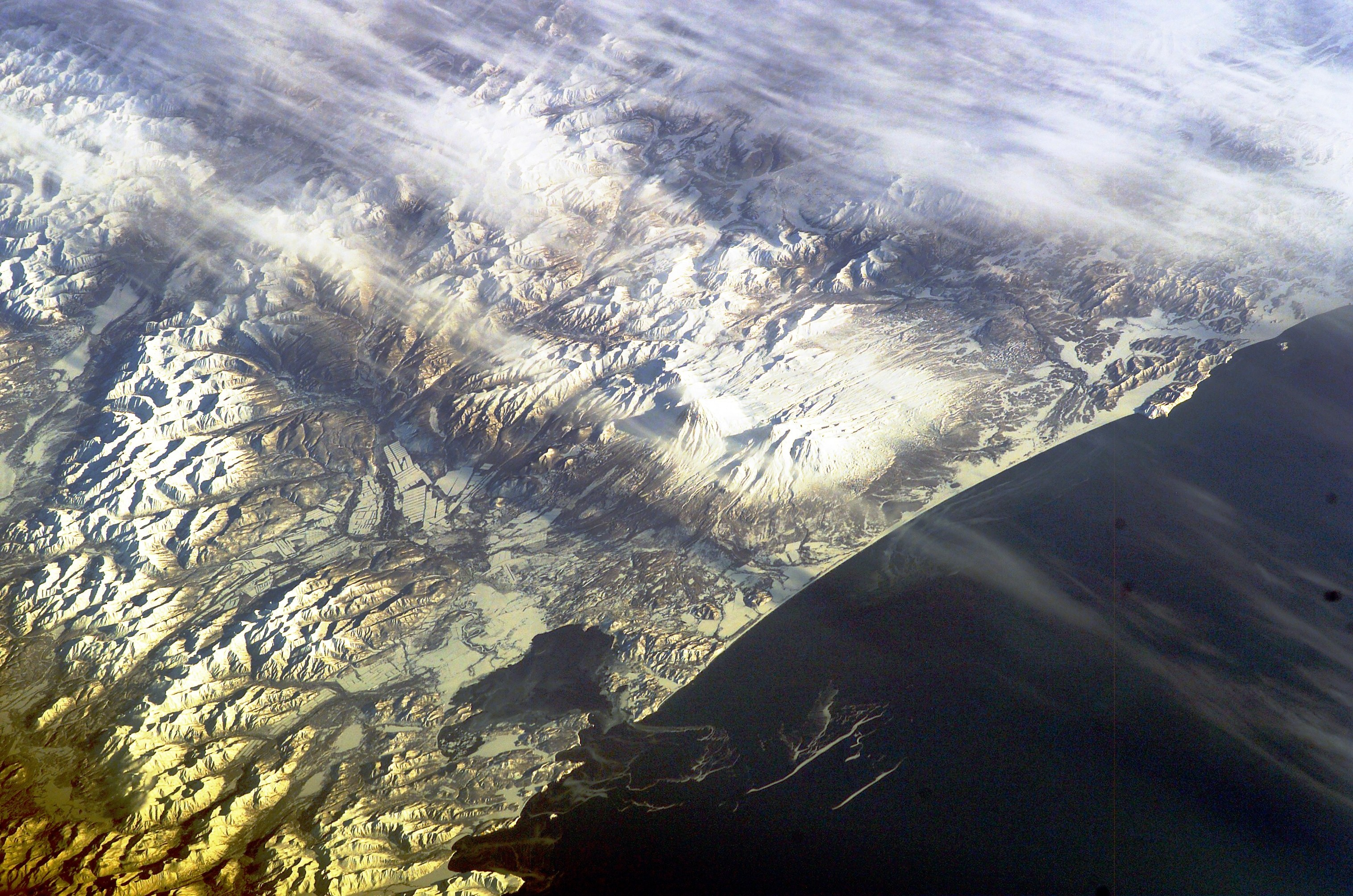
Avachinsky (centre, nearest coast) from space.

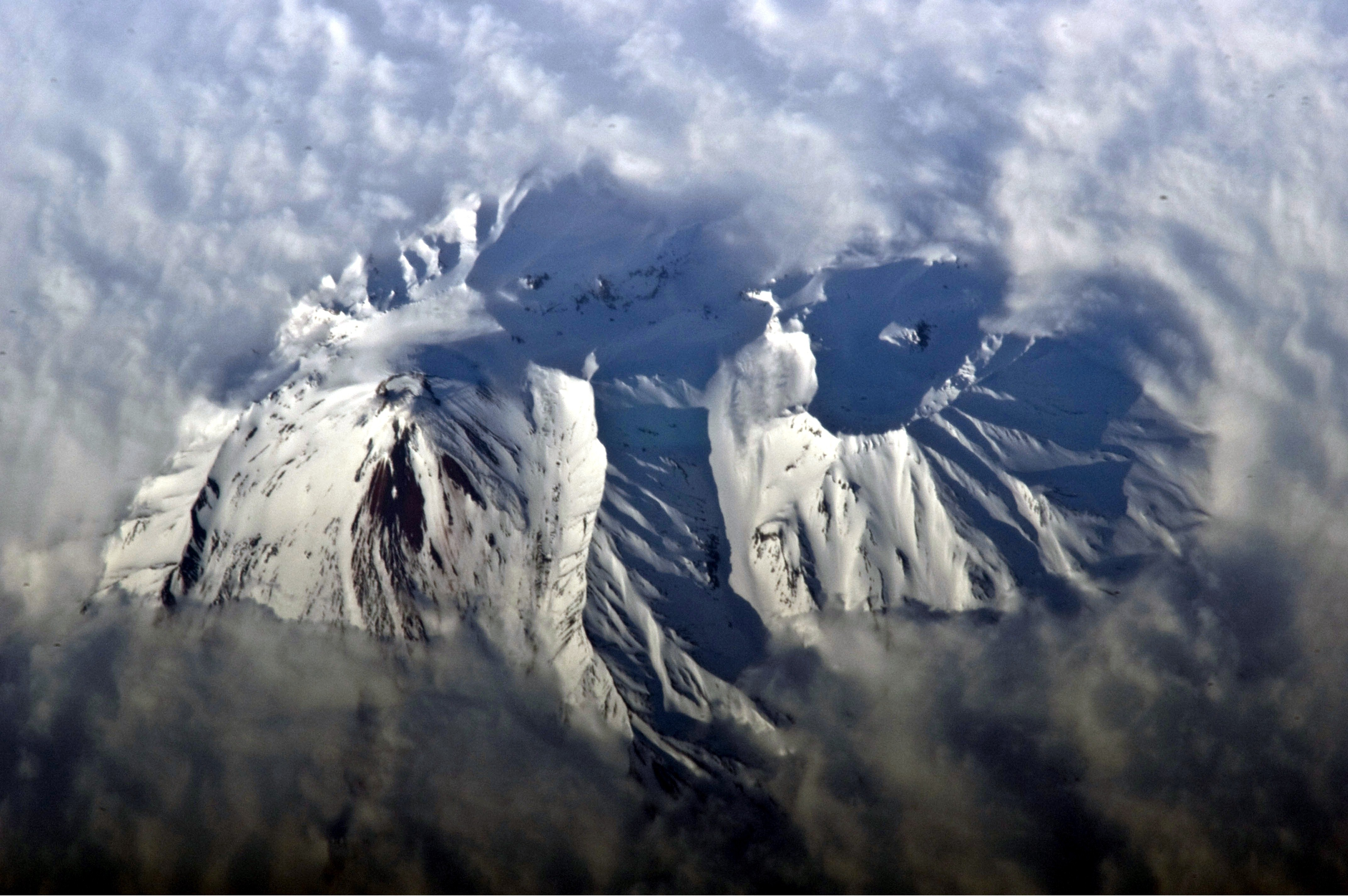
Astronaut photograph highlighting the summit crater and snow-covered slopes of the Avachinsky.

== Recorded history ==
In his Journal of Captain Cook's Last Voyage, John Ledyard records the eruption of Avachinsky on 15 June 1779. He refers to Koryaksky and Avachinsky as Peter and Paul.

On the 15th it continued calm until noon when it clouded up and became very black and dark: the two mountains Peter and Paul were covered with the atmosphere near half way from their summits down, and at two o'clock we had again a small shock of an earthquake, and heard a hollow rumbling noise in the air, and the atmosphere continuing to condense, it became almost as dark as night, and the face of heaven looked very wild: we singled the stops of the sheet-anchor and eased the ship aloft at all the portentous appearances. Between three and four the mountain Paul exploded with a tremendous shock that convulsed everything around us: The report that attended the explosion was very loud at first, but gradually decreased until it subsided to a sound like that of grumbling distant thunder.

== Recent activity ==
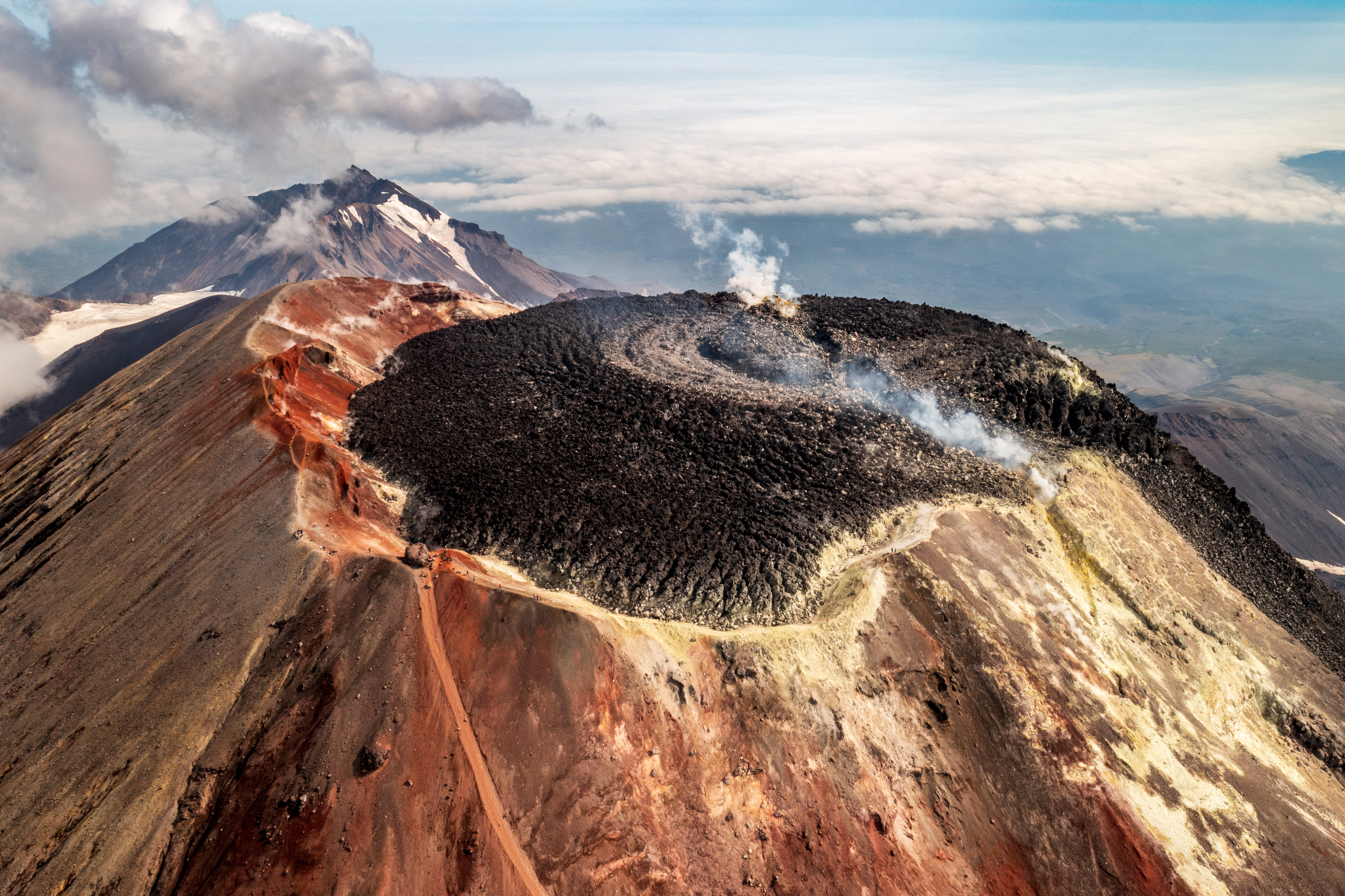
Avachinsky summit crater filled by a basaltic andesite lava flow

Avachinsky has erupted at least 16 times in recorded history. Eruptions have generally been explosive with pyroclastic flows and lahars having the tendency to be directed to the south-west by the breached caldera geometry. The most recent large eruption (VEI=4) occurred in 1945, ejecting around 0.25 km^{3} (0.060 cu mi) of magma. The volcano has since had small eruptions in 1991 and 2001.

The volcano continues to experience frequent earthquakes and many fumaroles exist near the summit. The temperature of gases emitted at these fumaroles has been measured at over 400 °C (752 °F). In light of its proximity to Petropavlovsk-Kamchatsky, Avachinsky was designated a Decade Volcano in 1996 as part of the United Nations' International Decade for Natural Disaster Reduction together with the nearby Koryaksky volcano.

== See also ==
- List of volcanoes in Russia
