= Tolmachev Dol =

Mountain in Russia

- Location within Far Eastern Federal District

Highest point
- Elevation: 1,021 m (3,350 ft)
- Coordinates: 52.63°N 157.58°E

Geography
- Location: Kamchatka, Russia

Geology
- Mountain type: Cinder cones
- Last eruption: 300 CE ± 150 years

Tolmachev Dol (Russian: Толмачёв Дол) (Tolmachev Plateau) is a volcanic highland located in the southern part of Kamchatka Peninsula, Russia, northeast of Opala volcano. The cones and lava fields cover a broad area around Tolmachev Lake within the intermountain Tolmachev depression of area about 650 sq.km.

Tolmachev Dol is a large volcanic field, consisting of cinder cones and lava flows (GVP). It has principally erupted andesite and dacite. The Tolmachev Depression resulted from sagging a major lava province.

The stratovolcano Tolmachev Volcano is nearby.

Activity in the volcanic field commenced during the Pleistocene (GVP). The Chasha crater was the site of a large eruption about 4,609 ± 33 years before present, which ejected about 1.1 cubic kilometres (0.26 cu mi) of ash over an area of 15,000 square kilometres (5,800 sq mi). This ash was formerly attributed to the Opala volcano. 300 CE, the last eruption took place (GVP).

== See also ==
- List of volcanoes in Russia
