= Koryaksky =

Active volcano on the Kamchatka Peninsula

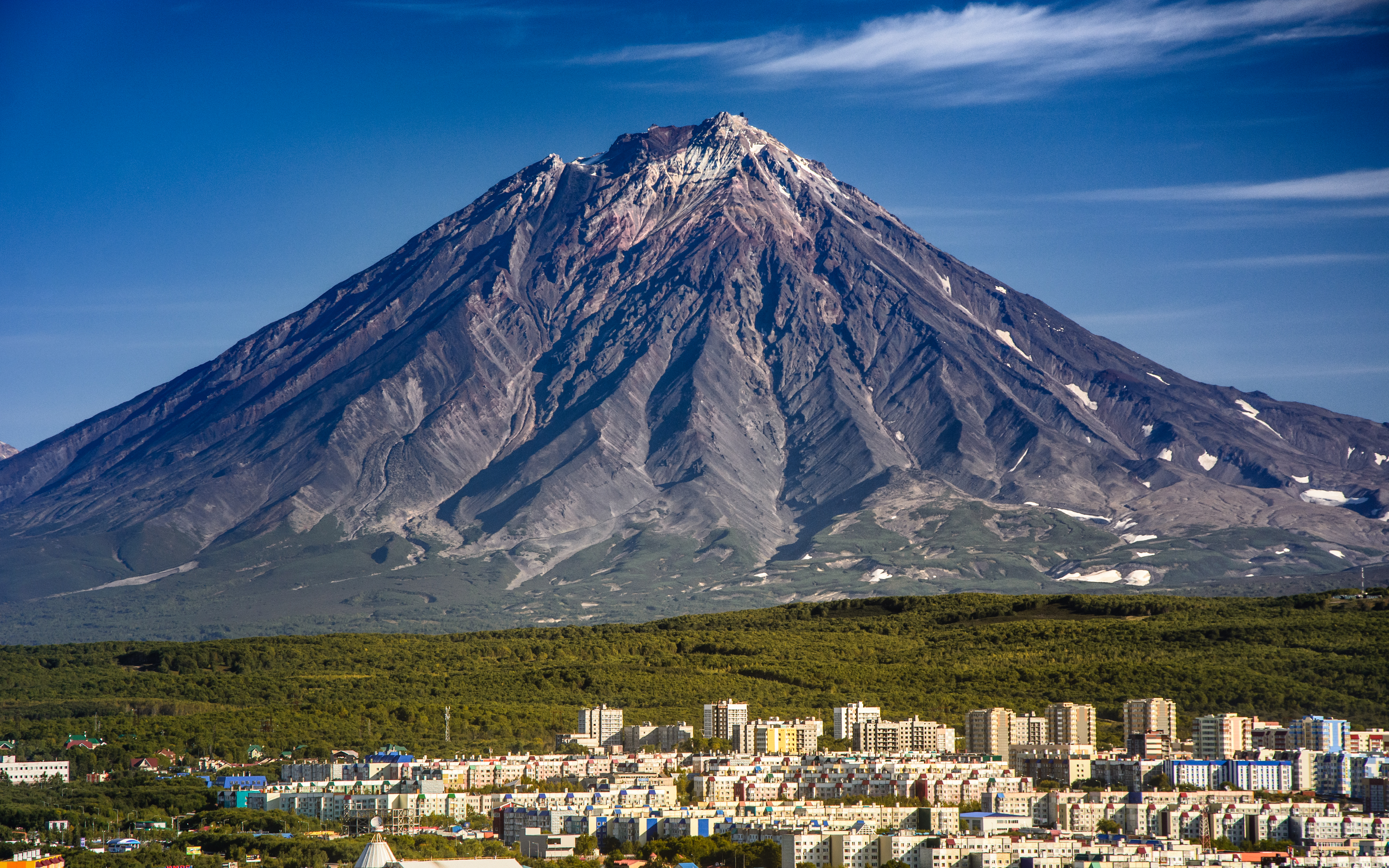
- Koryaksky volcano towering over Petropavlovsk-Kamchatsky in September 2014.

Highest point
- Elevation: 3,456 m (11,339 ft)
- Prominence: 2,999 m (9,839 ft); Ranked 91st
- Listing: Ultra
- Coordinates: 53°19′15″N 158°42′45″E

Geography
- Location within Kamchatka Krai
- Location: Kamchatka, Russia
- Parent range: Eastern Range

Geology
- Mountain type: Stratovolcano
- Last eruption: 2008 to 2009

Climbing
- Easiest route: Basic rock/snow climb

Koryaksky or Koryakskaya Sopka (Russian: Коря́кская со́пка) is an active volcano on the Kamchatka Peninsula in the Russian Far East. It lies within sight of Kamchatka Krai's administrative center, Petropavlovsk-Kamchatsky. Together with neighbouring Avachinsky, it is considered a Decade Volcano, worthy of particular study in light of its history of explosive eruptions and proximity to populated areas.

== Geological history ==
Koryaksky lies on the Pacific Ring of Fire, at a point where the Pacific Plate is sliding underneath the Eurasian Plate at about 80 mm (3 in) per year. A wedge of mantle material lying between the subducting Pacific Plate and the overlying Eurasian Plate is the source of dynamic volcanism over the whole Kamchatka Peninsula.

The volcano has probably been active for tens of thousands of years. Geological records indicate that there have been three major eruptions in the last 10,000 years, at 5500 BC, 1950 BC and 1550 BC. These three eruptions seem to have been mainly effusive, generating extensive lava flows.

== Recent activity ==
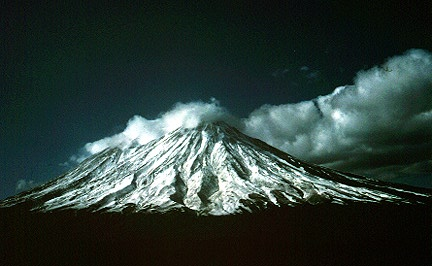
Clouds forming over Koryaksky (1936)

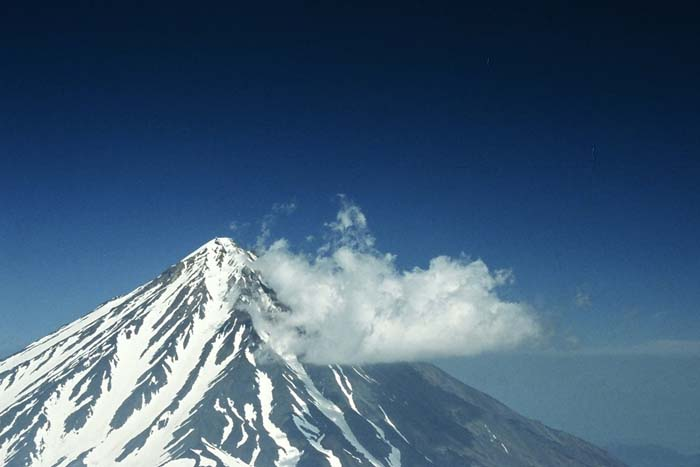
Koryaksky seen from neighbouring Avachinsky's peak, in 1985

Koryaksky erupted for the first time in recorded history in 1890. The eruption was characterised by lava emissions from fissures that opened up on the volcano's southwestern flank, and by phreatic explosions. It was thought to have erupted again five years later, but it was later shown that no eruption had occurred; what was thought to be an eruption column was simply steam generated by strong fumarolic activity.

Another brief, moderately explosive eruption occurred in 1926, after which the volcano lay dormant until 1956. The 1956 eruption was more explosive than the previous known eruptions, with VEI=3, and generated pyroclastic flows and lahars. The eruption continued until June 1957.

On 29 December 2008, Koryaksky erupted with a 6,000 m (19,685 ft) plume of ash, the first major eruption in 3,500 years.

In light of its proximity to Petropavlovsk-Kamchatsky, Koryaksky was designated a Decade Volcano in 1996 as part of the United Nations' International Decade for Natural Disaster Reduction, together with the nearby Avachinsky volcano.

== See also ==
- List of volcanoes in Russia
- List of ultras of Northeast Asia
