= Krakatoa (disambiguation) =

Krakatoa, also known as Krakatau, is a volcano in Indonesia.

Krakatoa or Krakatau may also refer to:

- 1883 eruption of Krakatoa
- Anak Krakatoa, a new island rising from the remains of the 1883 Krakatoa eruption
- Krakatoa archipelago adjacent islands and features

== Arts, entertainment and media ==
=== Films ===
- Krakatoa, a 1933 American short documentary film
- Krakatit, a 1948 science fiction film directed by Otakar Vávra based on the 1922 novel by Karel Čapek
- Krakatoa, East of Java, a 1969 American adventure and disaster film set against the backdrop of the Krakatoa eruption
- Krakatoa: The Last Days, a 2006 film about the Krakatoa eruption
- Krakatoa, a 2008 TV movie starring Pavel Douglas

=== Literature ===
- Krakatoa, East of Java (1969); a novelization of the 1969 movie by Michael Avallone
- Krakatoa: The Day the World Exploded (2005), a book by Simon Winchester

=== Music ===
- Krakatoa, a 1970s band with which Hans Zimmer began his career playing keyboards and synthesizers
- Krakatau (band), an Indonesian jazz fusion band formed in 1984
- "Krakatoa", a song by heavy metal band Saxon; See Saxon discography
- "Krakatoa", a mostly-spoken song by Styx on their album The Serpent Is Rising
- "Krakatau", an instrumental song by guitarist Yngwie Malmsteen on his 1988 album Odyssey

== Other uses ==
- Krakatoa (explosive), a demolitions device
- Krakatoa, a volumetric particle rendering toolkit by Thinkbox Software; See List of mergers and acquisitions by Amazon
- Krakatau Steel, a steelworks in Indonesia
  - Krakatau Steel Stadium, a multi-purpose stadium in Cilegon, Banten, Indonesia
  - Krakatau Wajatama, a subsidiary of Krakatau Steel
- Krakatauia, a genus of flies in the family Dolichopodidae

== Resources ==
- Krakatoa documentary and historical materials

== See also ==
- Krakoa, a fictional living island in Marvel Comics
