= Anak Krakatoa =

Volcanic island in the Sunda Strait, Indonesia

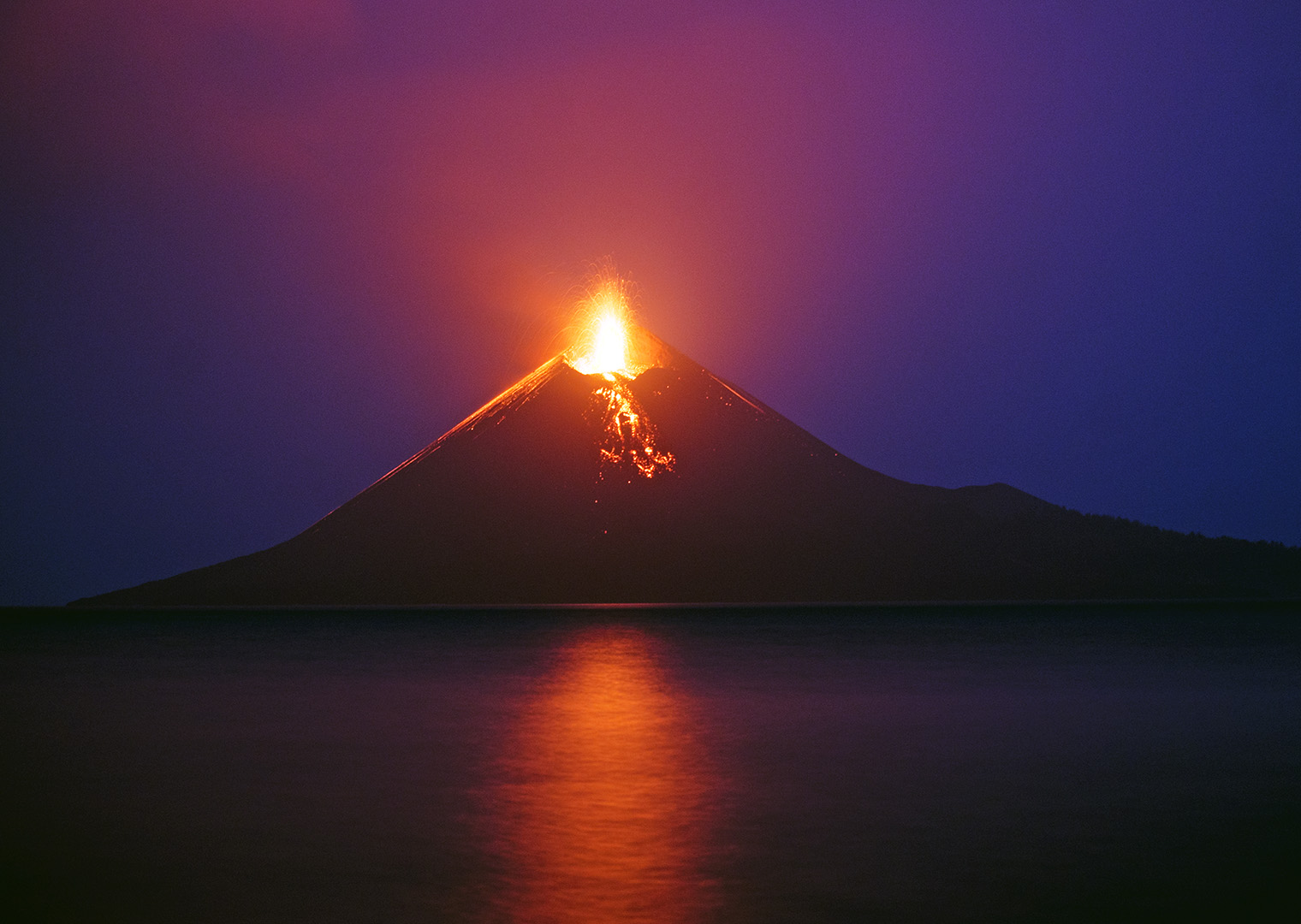
- Anak Krakatoa in 2018

Highest point
- Elevation: 285 m (935 ft) (current); 338 m (1,109 ft) (before 2018 eruption)
- Listing: Ring of Fire
- Coordinates: 6°06′07″S 105°25′23″E

Dimensions
- Area: 3.22 km^{2} (1.24 mi^{2})

Naming
- Native name: Anak Krakatau (Indonesian)

Geography
- Location within Indonesia
- Location: Sunda Strait; Lampung, Indonesia

Geology
- Rock age: Holocene – very recent (1920s)
- Mountain type: Somma-stratovolcano
- Last eruption: September 2026 – ongoing

Anak Krakatoa, or Anak Krakatau (Indonesian for 'child of Krakatoa'), is a volcanic island and an active volcano in Indonesia. On 29 December 1927, Anak Krakatoa first emerged from the caldera formed by the explosive volcanic 1883 eruption of Krakatoa that destroyed the island of Krakatoa (Krakatau). Sporadic eruptive activity has occurred at the site since the late 20th century. A large sector collapse of the volcano occurred on 22 December 2018, causing a deadly tsunami—the 2018 Sunda Strait tsunami. There has been subsequent activity since then in the 2020s. Anak Krakatoa's 4–6 September 2026 eruption caused a fog of ash in the nearby islands of Java, Sumatra, and other surrounding areas. Owing to its young age, the island of Anak Krakatoa is one of several in the area which are of interest to, and the subject of extensive study by, volcanologists.

== History ==
=== Background ===
After the cataclysmic eruption of Krakatoa in 1883, Krakatoa Island lost approximately two-thirds of its mass on the northwest side, obliterating the peaks of Perboewatan and Danan, and leaving only the southern half of the island, including the Rakata Volcano, as the last remnant of the original island. The lost area became a shallow sea.

=== Regrowth ===
In early 1927, visible volcanic activity began to occur at the point located between where the former peaks of Mount Perboewatan and Mount Danan had been. This was a short-lived appearance of a small island that was sunk by sea waves within a week. Several months later, volcanic activity began to create a more permanent land formation which, owing to rain and waves, once again collapsed under the sea after its volcanic activity stopped. This process reoccurred several times during the next three years.

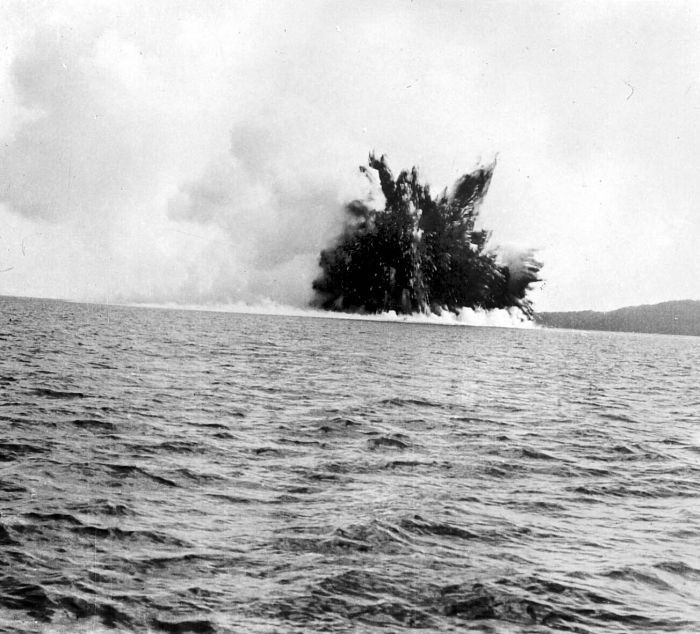
Anak Krakatoa, 1928

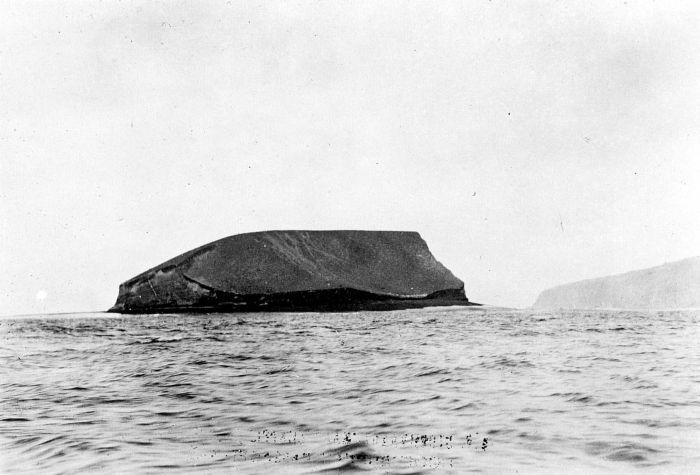
Anak Krakatoa, c. 1929

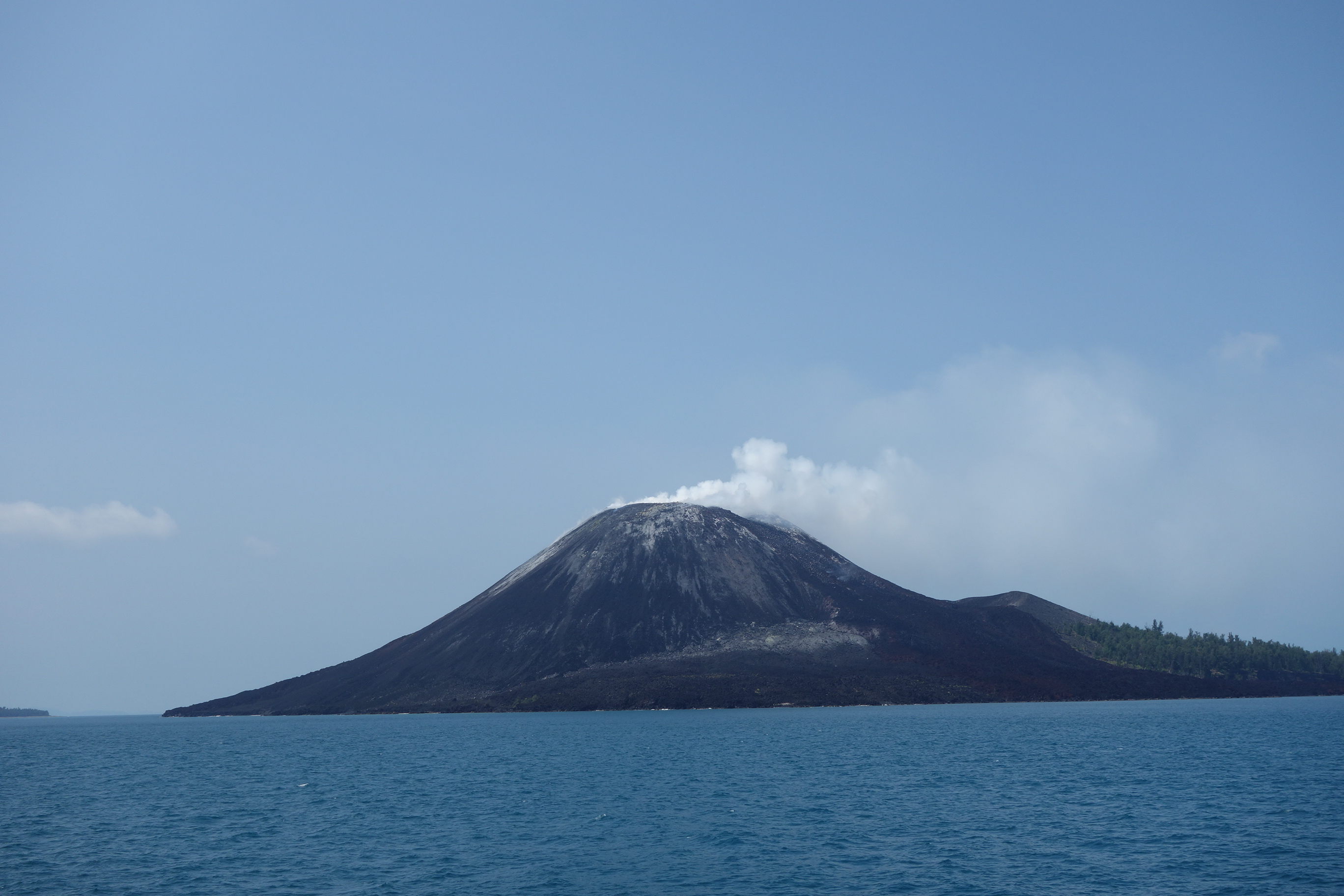
Anak Krakatoa in 2013, five years before the 2018 collapse

On 11 August 1930, the volcanic island permanently rose above sea level and was locally named Anak Krakatau ('child of Krakatoa'). It has been the site of repeated eruptive episodes ever since. Anak Krakatoa's highest point increased at an average rate of 7–9 meters per year through September 2018.

== Geography ==
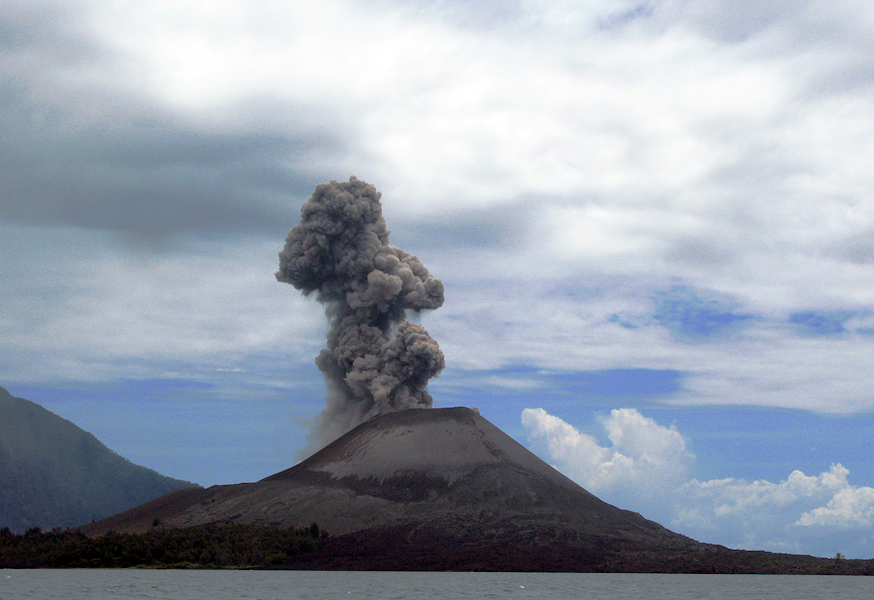
Eruptive activity, 2008

Anak Krakatoa is located in the Sunda Strait—between the islands of Java and Sumatra—in the Indonesian province of Lampung. The volcano is contained within the Ujung Kulon National Park, (Note: A UNESCO World Heritage Property.) and is part of the Pacific Ring of Fire. The island is surrounded by three other nearby islands: Sertung Island (Verlaten Island) to the west, Krakatau Kecil Island (Lang Island, Panjang Island, or Rakata Kecil) to the east, and Rakata Island to the south; they are all in what is now the Krakatoa archipelago.

=== Geology ===
The island is situated approximately 700 km (430 mi) north of the Sunda Trench marking the subduction zone separating the Australian Plate and the fixed Sunda Plate, atop an oceanic crust less than 25 km (16 mi) thick. In geological terms, it has recently formed within the caldera of the Krakatoa volcanic eruption. The entire island comprises a Somma-stratovolcano system of the late Holocene epoch, and features a pyroclastic cone. The major rock-type components of Anak Krakatoa include andesite, dacite and basalt, with minor indications of trachyte.

The island had reached a maximum elevation of 338 m (1,109 ft) before its collapse during the 2018 eruptive event.

== Volcanic activity ==
The volcano's most recent eruptive episode began in 1994. Quiet periods lasting a few days have alternated with almost continuous Strombolian eruptions since then. Hot gases, rocks, and lava were released in an eruption in April 2008. Scientists monitoring the volcano warned people to stay out of a 3 km (1.9 mi) zone around the island. On 6 May 2009, the Volcanological Survey of Indonesia raised the eruption alert status of Anak Krakatoa to Level III (Siaga; 'alert'). An expedition to the volcano revealed that a 100 m (330 ft) wide lava dome was growing in its crater. In January 2012, volcanologists at the University of Oregon warned that a tsunami caused by flank collapse of Anak Krakatoa was likely, as it had formed on the steep eastern slope of the large caldera formed by the 1883 explosive eruption.

=== 2018 eruption and aftermath ===
Anak Krakatoa over time (post-1927), ending right before the 2018 eruption

A new eruptive phase was observed starting in June 2018; on 15 October 2018, Anak Krakatoa had a strong Strombolian to weak Vulcanian eruption that sent lava bombs into the water.

An eruption of the volcano on 22 December 2018 caused a deadly tsunami, with waves up to five meters high making landfall. On 31 December, the disaster agency stated the tsunami's death toll was 437, with 14,059 injured. The tsunami affected more than 300 kilometers (186 mi) of coastline in Sumatra and Java, and 40,000 people were displaced. This made the eruption the second deadliest volcanic eruption of the 21st century to date. Sector collapse—with tsunami generation—was considered a potential hazard immediately before the eruption. Scientists had modeled the possibility six years before the event, and had identified the western flank as the section of the volcano most likely to fail.

Starting eight hours prior to the subaerial cone collapse, it was believed that activity within the volcano produced a sustained infrasound. Following the eruption, the southwest sector of the volcano, including the summit, had collapsed during the eruption, triggering the tsunami. On 23 December, this was confirmed by satellite data and helicopter footage, with the main conduit seen erupting from underwater, producing Surtseyan-style activity. The volcano lost over two-thirds of its volume due to the event, and its elevation above sea level was reduced from 338 m (1,109 ft) to just 110 m (360 ft). On 26 December, it was also reported that some of the volcanic ash fell into the western part of Java, specifically into Serang Regency and Cilegon.

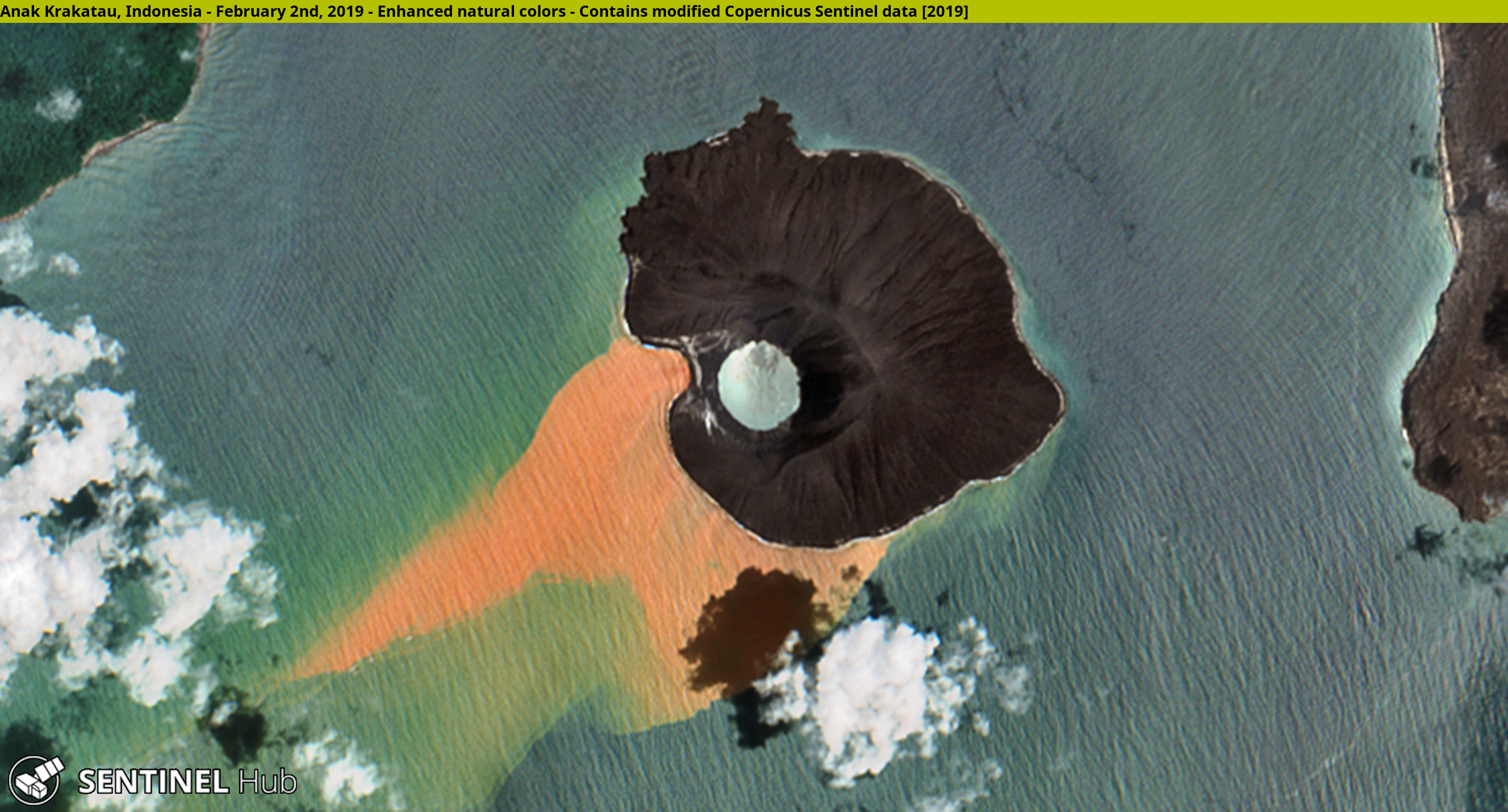
Modified Copernicus Sentinel-2 imagery of the volcano in February 2019

Satellite radar observations showed that by 10 January 2019, the volcano had continued to form from the continued deposition of material, with further eruptions beginning to remodel the remnant structure. The crater, which had become open to the sea immediately after the eruption, had a complete rim above sea level. On 14 February 2019, the volcano erupted lightly, and another eruption occurred again on 18 February whose plumes reportedly reached 610 masl. On 25 March 2019, the alert status was lowered down to Level II (Waspada; 'caution') since activity 'tends to decline'. In May 2019, phreatomagmatic activity was observed around the newly reconstructed crater as the volcano continued to increase in height and remodel the areas destroyed in 2018.

=== 2020s ===
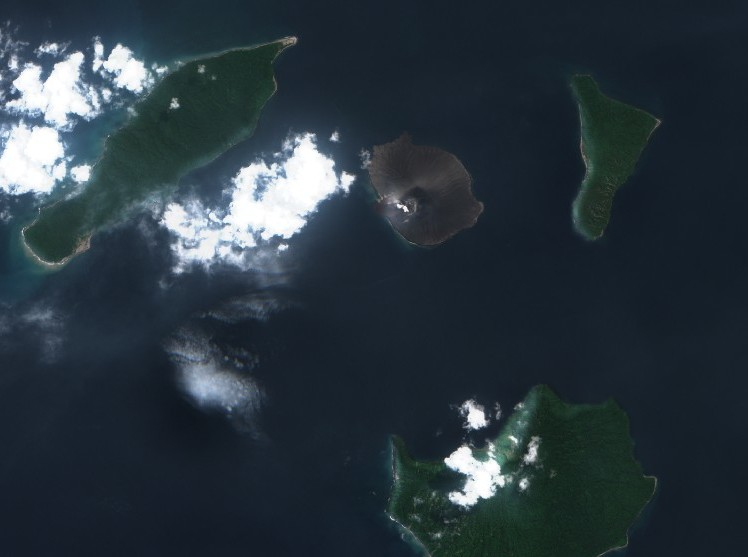
Sentinel-2 satellite view of Anak Krakatoa (upper center) on 3 May 2022 in natural color. Also in frame: Sertung Island (upper left), Panjang Island (upper right), and Rakata (lower right).

Anak Krakatoa began erupting again on the morning of 10 April 2020. The first eruption could be heard in the Indonesian capital of Jakarta, over 150 kilometres (93 mi) away; it was spewing out a 200 metres (660 ft) high column of ash and smoke according to the Center for Volcanology and Geological Disaster Mitigation's (PVMBG) (Note: One of the Geological Agency units of Ministry of Energy and Mineral Resources (Kementerian ESDM; Kementerian Energi dan Sumber Daya Mineral).) magma volcanic activity report. The report also said that the first eruption lasted one minute and 12 seconds, starting at 9:58 p.m. The eruption spewed ash to about 14 kilometres (46,000 ft) and a secondary ash plume made it approximately 11 kilometres (36,000 ft). The eruption was largely magmatic, with lava fountains visible. No widespread damage was reported, and the eruption ended several hours later.

21 minor eruptions occurred in early 2022; the largest was on 24 April. This led to the alert status being raised to Level III (Siaga; 'alert') on the next day. A further eruption cycle began on 15 September 2023. The PVMBG noted that they began to detect sulfur dioxide emissions via satellite data on 1 June and that shallow earthquake activity rose noticeably on 18 June 2026. This was followed by an eruption in July 2026, beginning on 2 July.

The continuous eruption occurred on 4–6 September 2026. (Note: It starts from 4 September at 11:07 p.m. and ends on 6 September at 12:04 a.m. local time.) Since then, by 06:00 a.m. on 11 September 2026, the initial eruption had been followed by a further 14 Strombolian eruptions. Schools in the nearby area temporarily close in favor of remote learning. This measure was passed through Circular No. 91/SE/2026 on 5 September as a safety precaution. The eruption forced the temporary closure of Soekarno–Hatta International Airport in Jakarta alongside seven other airports. Initially, the volcanic ash reportedly affected 209 flights, but the Indonesian Ministry of Transportation later estimated around 3,000 flights were grounded in total by 7 September, eighty percent of which were domestic flights. This affected approximately 341,000 passengers. All of the airports were reopened back on 7–8 September. On 7 September, a speedboat carrying eight people, including five journalists covering the eruption, went missing in the Sunda Strait.

Anak Krakatoa eruption as captured by the Suomi NPP satellite, 5 September 2026. The volcanic ash cloud is brown in color.

Based on the information collected from PVMBG, the Australian Bureau of Meteorology's Darwin Volcanic Ash Advisory Center, and analyses of Himawari 9 satellite imagery, the volcanic ashes were said to spread to five provinces via the wind: Banten, West Java, DKI Jakarta, Lampung, and Bengkulu. There are two clusters of ashes; the one that is up to 6,100 metres (20,000 ft) in altitude is roughly moving towards the east, and the one that is up to 15,200 metres (50,000 ft) in altitude is moving west into the Indian Ocean.

== See also ==
- Krakatoa documentary and historical materials
- List of volcanic eruptions by death toll
- List of volcanoes in Indonesia
- Surtsey
