= Rakata =

Volcano island in the Krakatoa caldera

Map of the Krakatau archipelago

Rakata (/rəˈkɑːtə/ rə-KAH-tə), also called Greater Krakatau, is a partially collapsed and uninhabited stratovolcano on the Indonesian island of Krakatoa (Indonesian: Krakatau) in the Sunda Strait between the islands of Sumatra and Java. Standing 813 m (2,667 ft) tall, it was the largest and southernmost of three volcanoes that formed the island of Krakatoa (the others being Danan and Perboewatan) and the only one of the volcanoes not totally destroyed in the 1883 eruption. Rakata is the last remnant of the original island prior to its destruction. However, Rakata did lose its northern half in that eruption, leaving just its southern half. The exposed cliff is quite striking visually, partially of a large exposed dike terminating in a large lenticular extrusion at the middle of the almost vertical cliff. The feature has been called "the Eye of Krakatoa."

== Etymology ==
Because the words Rakata and Krakatau are the same in Indonesian, both names are used interchangeably, leading to confusion in languages which distinguish between the two words. In geological usage, Krakatau is the island and Rakata is the main volcanic cone on that island. But Krakatau is also used for the volcanic edifice as a whole, including all four islands (Krakatau, Anak Krakatau, Verlaten and Lang) of the Krakatoa Archipelago. Before 1883 (and in many of the eruption reports), Rakata was just referred to as "the Peak (of Krakatau)."

== Physical features ==
Rakata is a volcanic cone with its northern face being a vertical cliff, exposing much of its eruptive history. More than 25 extrusion dikes have been counted; the largest at the center runs from sea level to 320 meters above and terminates in a large (about 6 meters in diameter), convex form. It is not known if the two are actually related in origin or just coincidental.

== The 1883 eruption ==
Krakatau island group before and after the 1883 eruption.

Rakata seems to have played a comparatively minor role in the 1883 eruption of Krakatoa. Some reports seem to indicate it started erupting ("venting") in late July, compared to Perboewatan starting in May and Danan in June. (Furneaux mentions an unsourced report that the Peak had collapsed sometime in July.) All eruptive centres of Krakatau have a common source, meaning that they are different vents of a single volcano. The map made by Capt. Ferzaneer from his visit on 11 August shows no eruptive "foci" from Rakata or its slopes (although there are several from the southern part of Danan), but he was not able to investigate the southern or western parts of the island due to the ash cloud blowing in that direction.

In his portrayal of the catastrophe, Rogier Verbeek depicts that Rakata's northern half was destroyed, along with the central part of the island, during the largest explosion, which occurred at 10:02 am on 27 August. Verbeek surmised that unlike Danan and Perboewatan, Rakata was not directly above the magma chamber, being connected only by a fissure which lay along the cleavage line of the caldera. However, examining the cliff from the air indicates two arcs, the second of which seems to be due to later (post-1883) landslides of unstable cliff material.

In surveys made a few months after the catastrophe, Rakata's height is given as 830 m, compared to 820 m before, however this may be due to inaccuracy of the earlier surveys. Verbeek reports that the cleavage was approximately at the old summit. The remnant of Rakata grew rather considerably in area due to falling pumice. However, most of the increased area (largely to the west and southeast) was washed away within several years by wave action.

Due to the severity of the eruption, leaving very little flora and fauna alive, Rakata has been used as a modern study on biological island colonization.

== Recent activity ==
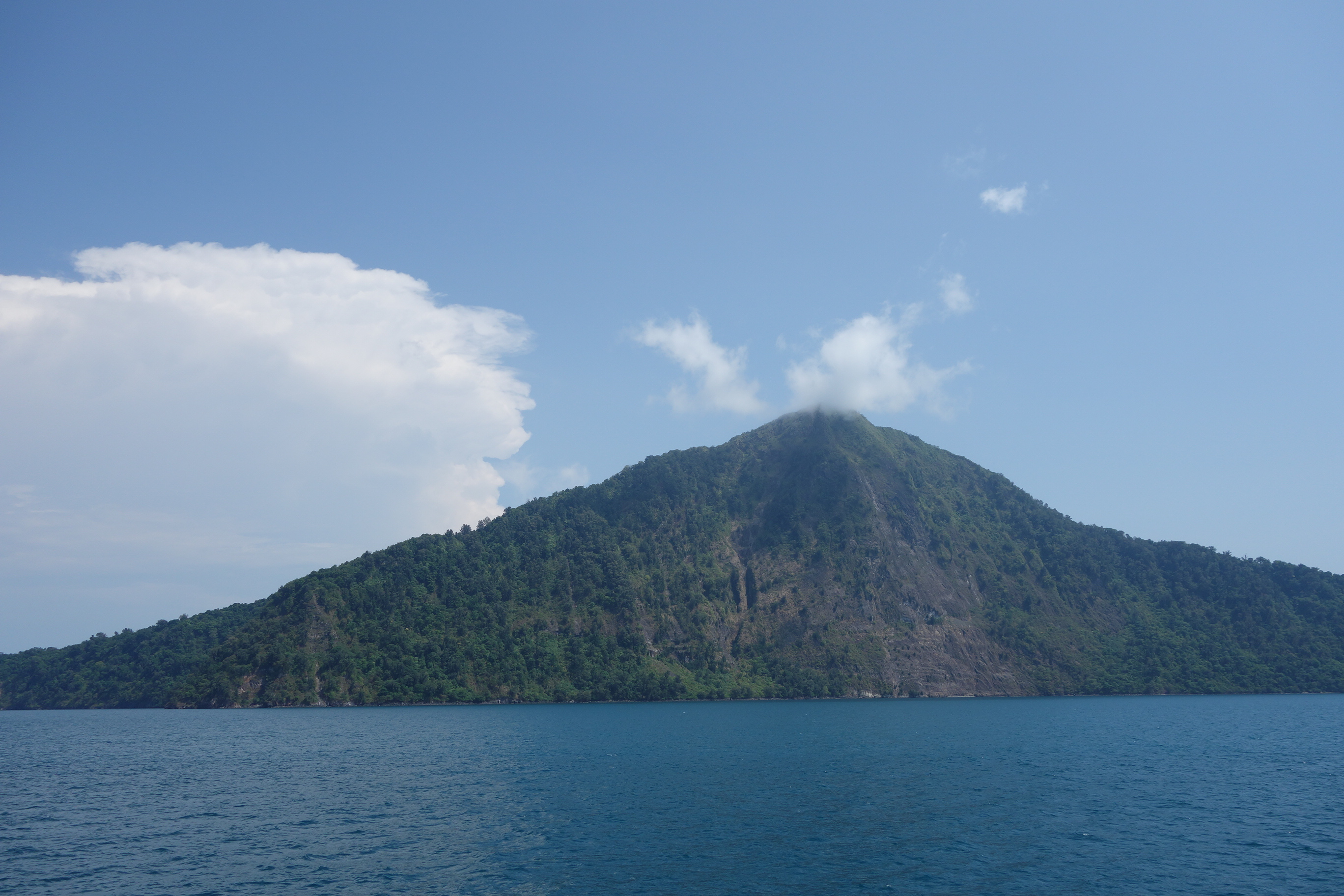
Rakata in October 2013

There are no dated reports of eruptions from Rakata since the 1883 catastrophe, although tentative datings have been made from dating ash deposits left.

Subsequent activity of Krakatoa seems to be limited to the area that had been between Danan (volcano) and Perboewatan, where Anak Krakatoa has arisen, starting in 1927.

== See also ==
- List of volcanoes in Indonesia
- Anak Krakatau
