= 1883 eruption of Krakatoa =

Volcanic eruption in the Sunda Strait

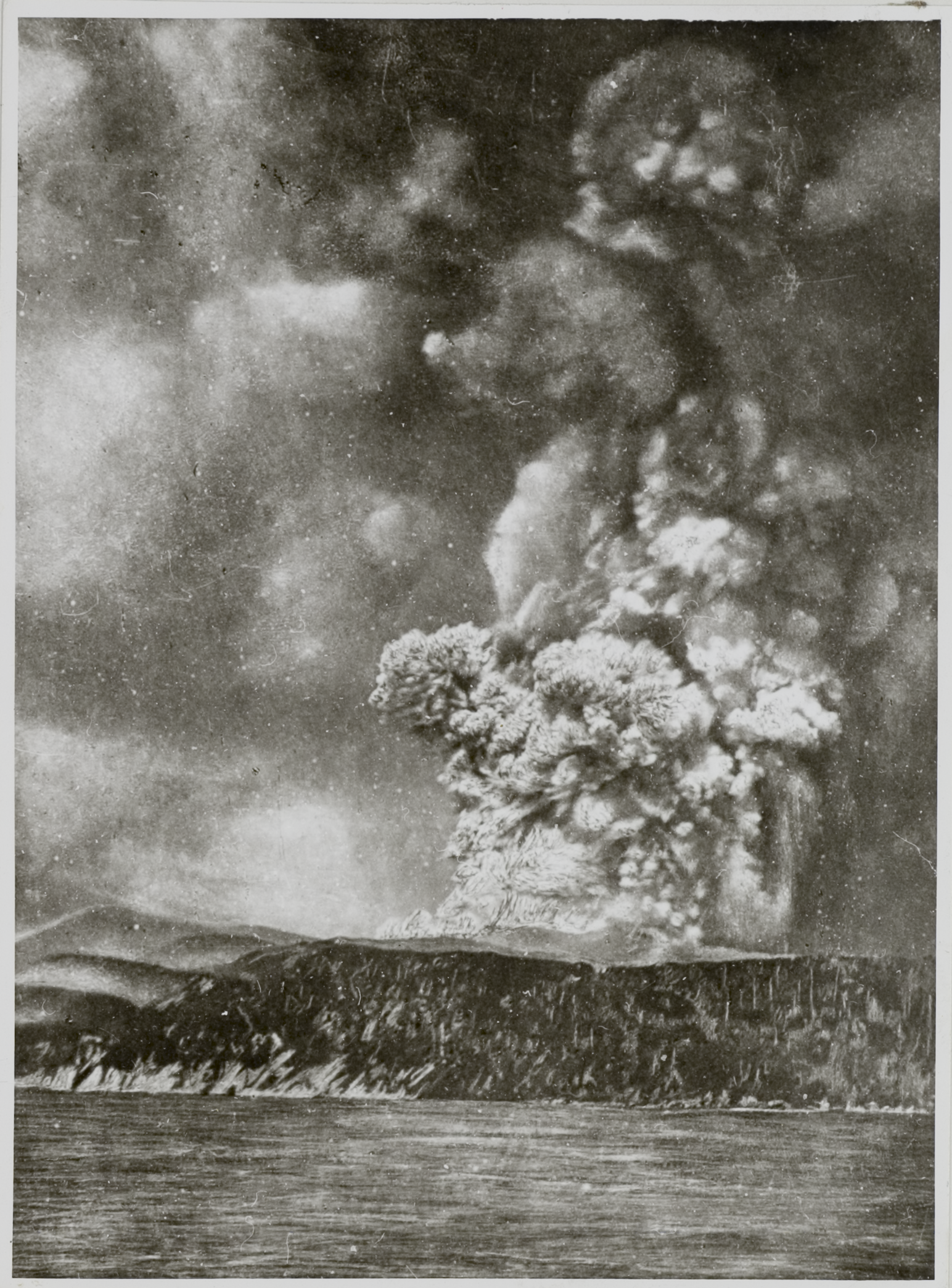
- Photograph of the eruption
- Volcano: Krakatoa
- Start date: 20 May 1883
- End date: 21 October 1883
- Type: Plinian eruption
- Location: Krakatoa archipelago, Sunda Strait, Dutch East Indies; 6.102°S 105.423°E
- VEI: 6
- Impact: Over 70% of the island of Krakatoa destroyed and collapsed into a caldera; 20 million tons of sulfur released; volcanic winter causes five-year average world temperature drop of 1.2 °C (2.2 °F)
- Deaths: 36,417 estimated

Maps
- The change in geography after the eruption

Between 19 May and 21 October 1883, the volcanic island of Krakatoa (located in the Sunda Strait, then part of the Dutch East Indies—modern-day Indonesia) began erupting, lasting more than five months. On 27 August, the island had its most significant eruption, which destroyed over 70% of the island and its surrounding archipelago, the island collapsing into a caldera. The eruption of 27 August had an estimated volcanic explosivity index of 6, and is one of the deadliest and most destructive volcanic events in recorded history; the third explosion of that day, that occurred at 10:02 a.m., remains the loudest-known sound in history.

The explosion was heard 3,110 kilometres (1,930 mi) away in Perth, Western Australia, and Rodrigues near Mauritius, 4,800 kilometres (3,000 mi) away. The acoustic pressure wave circled the globe more than three times. At least 36,417 deaths are attributed to the eruption and the tsunamis it created. Significant additional effects were felt worldwide in the days and weeks after the volcano's eruption. Additional seismic activity was reported until February 1884, but any reports after October 1883 were dismissed by Rogier Verbeek's subsequent investigation into the eruption.

== Eruption ==
=== Early phase ===
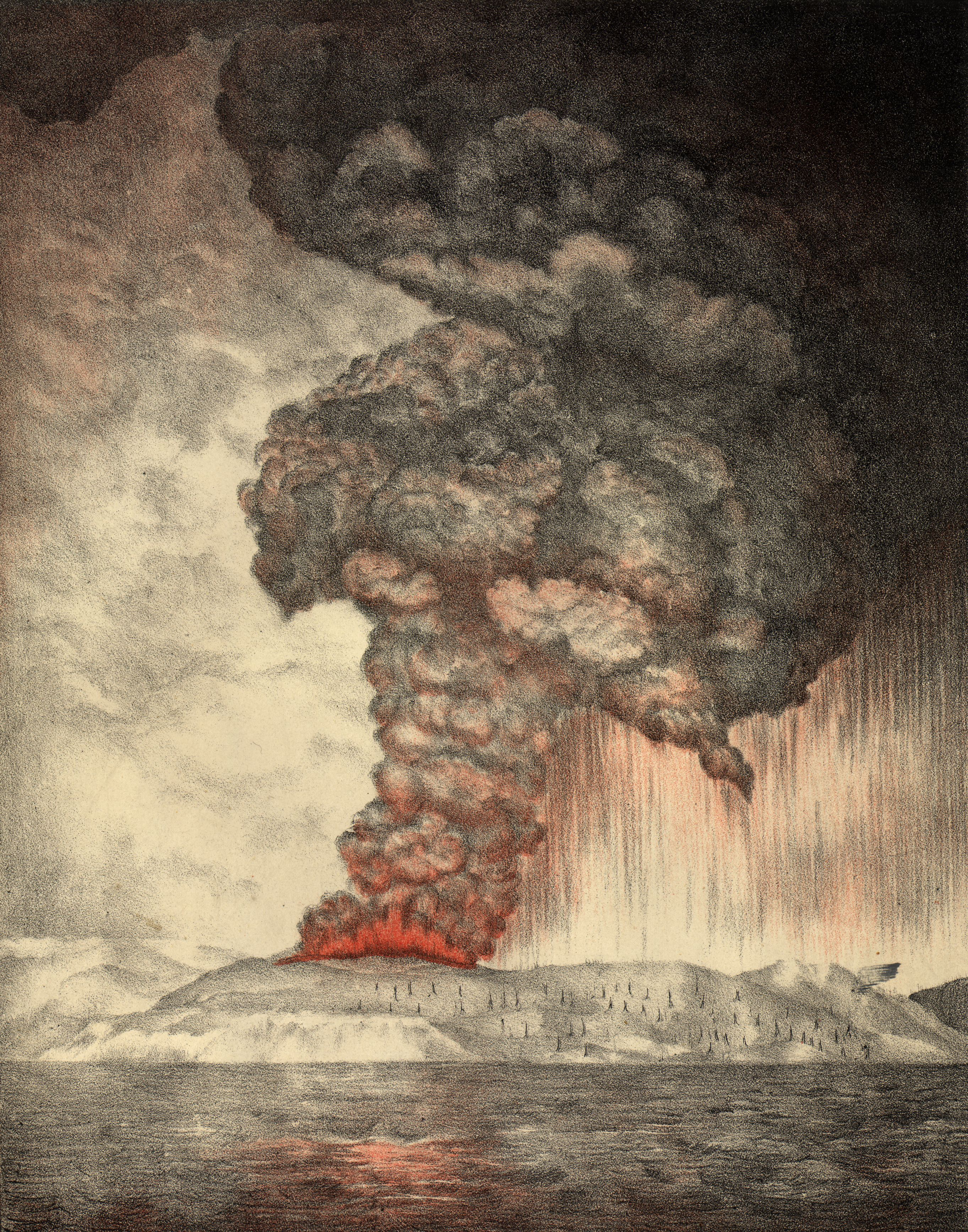
Lithograph of the eruption c. 1888

In the years before the 1883 eruption, seismic activity around the Krakatoa volcano was intense, with earthquakes felt as far away as the Australian Northern Territory, one of which, in 1880, damaged a lighthouse. Strombolian activity began on 20 May 1883, and steam venting began to occur regularly from Perboewatan, the northernmost of the island's three cones. Eruptions of ash reached an estimated altitude of 6 kilometres (20,000 ft), and explosions could be heard in Batavia (Jakarta) 160 km (100 mi) away, rattling windows and doors. Dust fell 480 km (300 mi) away. An excursion party sent to the island on 26 May reported that the islands were covered with a fine white dust, with explosions coming from Perboewatan every five to ten minutes. Although by this time the eruptions were calming down, some of the explosions were still very energetic, hurling pumice opposite the direction of the wind. A large crater approximately 900 metres (3,000 ft) in diameter formed, with a cavity from which issued plumes of steam. The eruptions soon quietened after the initial violence.

Around 16 June, there were loud explosions and a thick black cloud covered the islands for five days. The eruptions started gaining strength again on 19 June. On 24 June, a prevailing east wind cleared the cloud, and two ash columns could be seen issuing from Krakatau. It was also noticed that the summit cone of Perboewatan was gone, which an extensive report of a few years later attributes it to having been blown away. The seat of the eruption is believed to have been a new vent or vents that formed on that day, between Perboewatan and Danan. The violence of the ongoing eruptions caused tides in the vicinity to be unusually high, and ships at anchor had to be moored with chains. Earthquakes were felt at Anyer, Banten, and ships began to report large pumice masses to the west in the Indian Ocean. A third vent, and later many more, appeared. The eruptions continued throughout July, and their violence continued to increase until the explosions of 27 August.

In early August, a Dutch topographical engineer, Captain H. J. G. Ferzenaar, investigated the Krakatau islands. He noted three major ash columns (the newer from Danan), which obscured the western part of the island, and steam plumes from at least eleven other vents, mostly between Danan and Rakata. When he landed, he noted an ash layer about 50 cm (1.6 ft) thick and the destruction of all vegetation, leaving only tree stumps. He advised against any further landings.

=== Climactic phase ===
By 25 August, the Krakatau eruptions intensified. At about 1:00 p.m. on 26 August, the eruption entered its climactic phase. By 2:00 p.m., a black ash cloud could be seen 27 km (89,000 ft) high. At this point, the eruption was almost continuous, and explosions could be heard every ten minutes. By 5:00 p.m., the explosions were audible all over Java. Waves approximately a metre high, which may have been produced by steam explosions, began battering the coasts of Java and Sumatra at 5:30 p.m., and continued throughout the night. Ships within 20 km (12 mi) of the volcano reported heavy ash fall, with pieces of hot pumice up to 10 cm (4 in) in diameter landing on their decks. Between 7:00 and 8:00 p.m., a small tsunami hit the shores of Java and Sumatra, 40 km (25 mi) away.

=== Explosions ===
On 27 August, eleven enormous explosions occurred, which marked the climax of the eruption. At 5:30 a.m., the first explosion was at Perboewatan, causing a tsunami heading to Telok Betong, now known as Bandar Lampung. At 6:44 a.m., Krakatau exploded again, at Danan; the resulting tsunami moved east and west. The third and largest explosion, at 10:02 a.m. (some sources say 9:58 a.m.), was so powerful that it was heard 3,110 km (1,930 mi) away in Perth, Western Australia, and the Indian Ocean island of Rodrigues, near Mauritius, 4,800 km (3,000 mi) away, where the blast was thought to have been cannon fire from a nearby ship. The third explosion was the loudest sound that has ever been measured. The loudness of the blast heard 160 km (100 mi) from the volcano has been calculated to have been 180 dBSPL (180 dB re 20 μPa, or 20 kPa).

Although heard at very great distances, the sounds of the largest explosions were much less noticeable, or not heard at all near the volcano. The reasons for this are complex and still debated by volcanologists today; the sound waves may have been projected upwards to the stratosphere and reflected away from the area, partly by ash suspended in the air. Although often directly linked in popular accounts, the explosions and the tsunamis were probably caused by distinct mechanisms. The explosions may have emanated from huge pulses of gas-laden magma, and the waves followed later when the ejecta slumped back down into the surrounding sea. The worst of the many tsunamis that resulted were estimated to have been over 30 m (100 ft) high in places. A large area of the Sunda Strait and places on the Sumatran coast were affected by pyroclastic flows from the volcano. Verbeek and others believe that the final major Krakatau eruption was a lateral blast, or pyroclastic surge. Material shot out of the volcano at 2,575 km/h (1,600 mph). The energy released from the explosion has been estimated to be equal to about 200 megatonnes of TNT (840 petajoules), roughly four times as powerful as the Tsar Bomba, the most powerful thermonuclear weapon ever detonated. This makes it one of the most powerful explosions in recorded history. At 10:41 a.m., a landslide tore off half of Rakata's cone, along with the remainder of the island to the north of Rakata. It is still debated whether this event caused the loudest of the explosions; either way, the collapse of the island into the magma chamber heralded the end of the paroxysmal phase.

==== Pressure wave ====
Some islands in the western Indian Ocean, approximately 4,800 kilometres (3,000 mi) away, still heard it at nearly the same level as a gun blast. Due to the limitations of the speed of sound, it is likely that people on these far away islands did not hear Krakatau for nearly four hours after its eruption. The pressure wave generated by the colossal third explosion radiated out from Krakatau at 1,086 km/h (675 mph). The eruption is estimated to have reached 180 dBSPL (180 dB re 20 μPa, or 20 kPa) at 100 miles from the source - possibly 310 dB at the explosion site itself - loud enough to be heard 5,000 kilometres (3,100 mi) away. It was so powerful that the sound it produced ruptured the eardrums of sailors on RMS Norham Castle of the Castle Line, which was hove to off Sumatra roughly 64 km (40 mi) away, and caused a spike of more than 8.5 kilopascals (2.5 inHg) in the pressure gauge attached to a gasometer in the Batavia (correspondent to modern day Jakarta) gasworks 160 km (100 mi) away, sending it off the scale. At Batavia, the air waves burst windows and cracked walls. (Note: A spike of more than 2 1/2 inches of mercury (ca 85 hPa) is equal to approximately 180 dBSPL; to compare this impact, the human threshold for pain is 134 decibels (dBSPL); and short-term hearing effect damage can occur at 120 dBSPL;)

The pressure wave was recorded on barographs worldwide. Several barographs recorded the wave seven times over five days: four times with the wave travelling away from the volcano to its antipodal point and three times travelling back to the volcano. Hence, the wave rounded the globe three and a half times.

==== Tsunamis ====
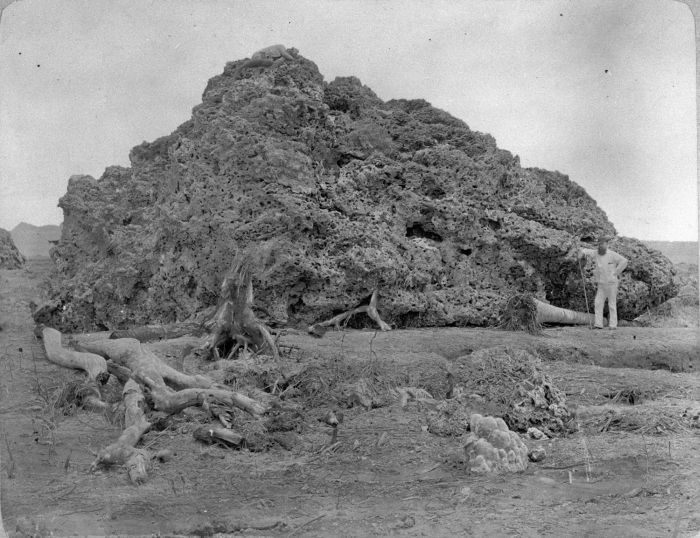
Coral block thrown onto the shore of Java by the tsunami

Massive tsunamis struck the coastlines of the Sunda Strait, entirely submerging some islands. Some 80 km (50 mi) away, the low-lying Thousand Islands were submerged under 2 metres (7 ft) of seawater, forcing people to climb trees. The tsunamis produced by the third explosion were the largest, although the first two explosions did produce smaller tsunamis. The town of Merak was destroyed by a tsunami that was 46 metres (151 ft) high. (Note: A documentary film showed tests made by a research team at Kiel University, Germany, of pyroclastic flows moving over the water. See Freundt, Armin (2002). "Entrance of hot pyroclastic flows into the sea: experimental observations". Bulletin of Volcanology. 65 (2–3): 144–164. Bibcode:2002BVol...65..144F. doi:10.1007/s00445-002-0250-1. S2CID 73620085. The tests revealed that hot ash travelled over the water on a cloud of superheated steam, continuing to be a pyroclastic flow after crossing water; the heavy matter precipitated out of the flow shortly after initial contact with the water, creating a tsunami due to the precipitate mass.) The waves reached heights of up to 24 metres (79 ft) along the south coast of Sumatra and up to 42 metres (138 ft) along the west coast of Java. The tsunamis washed the land clean of vegetation and destroyed human settlements. The Loudon, which at the time was anchored near the village of Telok Betong, survived the waves. Passengers produced this eyewitness account:

Suddenly we saw a gigantic wave of prodigious height advancing toward the seashore with considerable speed. Immediately, the crew ... managed to set sail in face of the imminent danger; the ship had just enough time to meet with the wave from the front. The ship met the wave head on and the Loudon was lifted up with a dizzying rapidity and made a formidable leap... The ship rode at a high angle over the crest of the wave and down the other side. The wave continued on its journey toward land, and the benumbed crew watched as the sea in a single sweeping motion consumed the town. There, where an instant before had lain the town of Telok Betong, nothing remained but the open sea.

A farm worker who was near Merak on Monday morning reports:

...all of a sudden there came a great noise. We...saw a great black thing, a long way off, coming towards us. It was very high and very strong, and we soon saw that it was water. Trees and houses were washed away... The people began to...run for their lives. Not far off was some steep sloping ground. We all ran towards it and tried to climb up out of the way of the water. The wave was too quick for most of them, and many were drowned almost at my side... There was a general rush to climb up in one particular place. This caused a great block, and many of them got wedged together and could not move. Then they struggled and fought, screaming and crying out all the time. Those below tried to make those above them move on again by biting their heels. A great struggle took place for a few moments, but...one after another, they were washed down and carried far away by the rushing waters. You can see the marks on the hill side where the fight for life took place. Some... dragged others down with them. They would not let go their hold, nor could those above them release themselves from this death-grip.

Away from the coasts of the Sunda Strait, the waves reached a height of four metres (13 ft) on Southern Sumatra. One person was killed in Sri Lanka. Ships as far away as South Africa rocked as tsunamis hit them, and the victims' bodies were found floating in the ocean for months after the event. The tsunamis which accompanied the eruption were believed to have been caused by gigantic pyroclastic flows entering the sea; each of the four great explosions was accompanied by large pyroclastic flows resulting from the gravitational collapse of the eruption columns. This caused several cubic kilometres of material to enter the sea, displacing an equal volume of seawater.

Smaller waves were recorded on tidal gauges as far away as the English Channel. These occurred too soon to be remnants of the initial tsunamis, which owing to a wavelength of less than 7 km (4 mi), failed to cause significant damage at large distance, and may have been caused by concussive air waves from the eruption. These air waves circled the globe several times and were still detectable on barographs five days later.

==== Pyroclastic flows and tephra ====
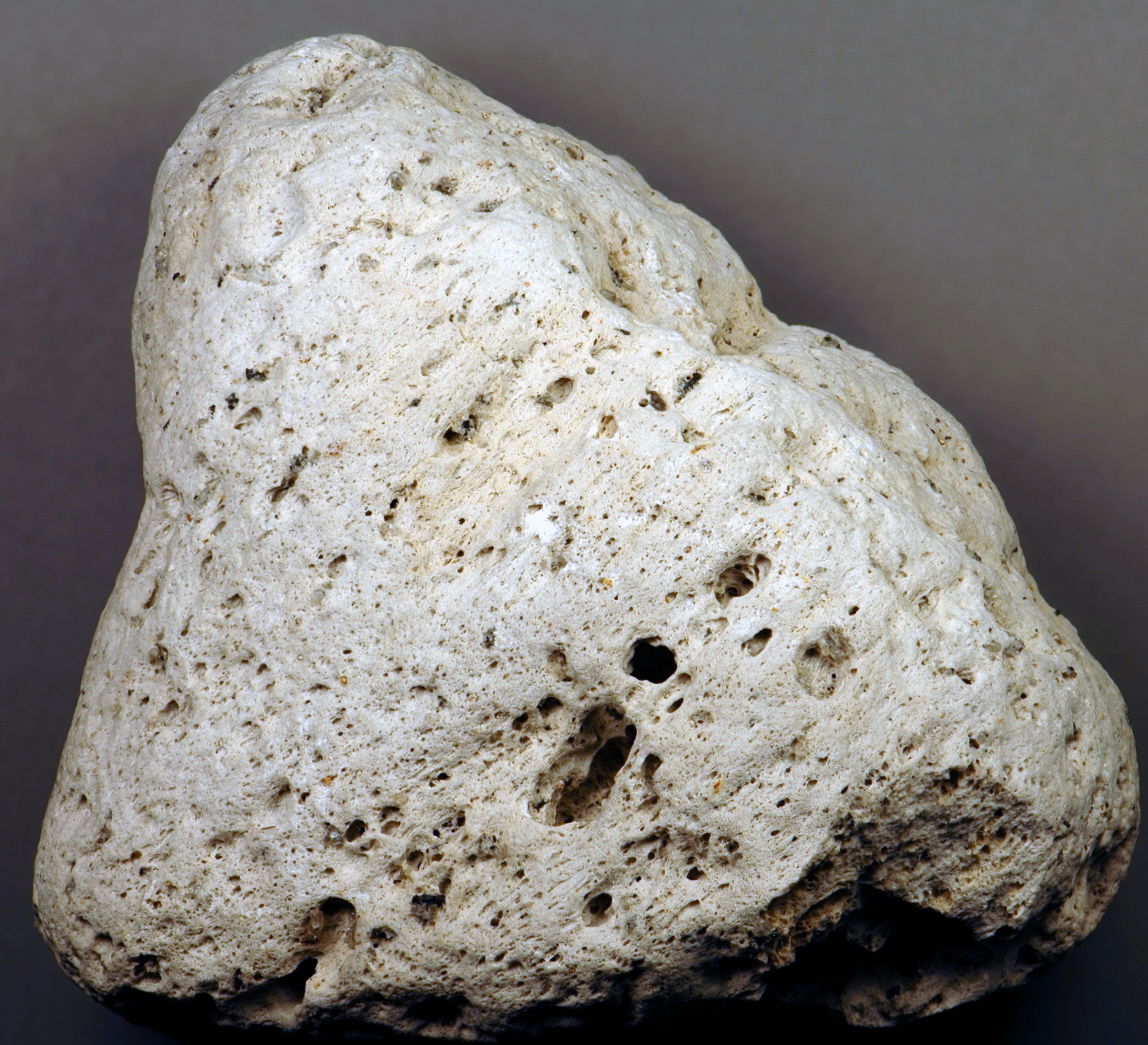
Rhyodacite pumice from the late August 1883 eruption of Krakatoa. This rock floated across the Indian Ocean for almost a year before it washed ashore at Takwa Beach, Kenya, East Africa.

About 10% of the eruption fatalities were from pyroclastic flows. The pyroclastic flows and surges produced by the third explosion moved faster than 100 km/h (62 mph) and travelled over the sea up to 80 km (50 mi) from the source, affecting an area constrained to a minimum of 4,000 km^{2} (1,500 sq mi). Pyroclastic deposits thought to be from the flows have been found on Southeast Sumatra, and northwest of the volcano on the islands of Sebesi, Sebuku and Lagoendi, while on Southwest Sumatra the flows burnt victims. They travelled 40 km (25 mi) across the Sunda Strait. Once they hit Southern Sumatra, they incinerated entire villages and burned all vegetation. Two thousand of the corpses in Southern Sumatra appear to have been scorched to death, presumably by the pyroclastic flows. The Loudon and the W.H. Besse, around 65 km (40 mi) north-northeast and 80 km (50 mi) east-northeast of Krakatau, respectively, were hit by strong winds and tephra. They were farther away than the scorched victims of the hot flows in Sumatra, so the ships and crew survived. The flows had moved across the water on a cushion of superheated steam. There are also indications of submarine pyroclastic flows reaching 15 km (9 mi) from the volcano.

An eyewitness enveloped by the outermost edges of the pyroclastic flow described her experience:

Suddenly, it became pitch dark. The last thing I saw was the ash being pushed up through the cracks in the floorboards, like a fountain. I turned to my husband and heard him say in dispair "Where is the knife?... I will cut all our wrists and then we shall be released from our suffering sooner." The knife could not be found. I felt a heavy pressure, throwing me to the ground. Then it seemed as if all the air was being sucked away and I could not breathe... I felt people rolling over me... No sound came from my husband or children... I remember thinking, I want to...go outside...but I could not straighten my back... I tottered, doubled up, to the door... I forced myself through the opening... I tripped and fell. I realized the ash was hot and I tried to protect my face with my hands. The hot bite of the pumice pricked like needles... Without thinking, I walked hopefully forward. Had I been in my right mind, I would have understood what a dangerous thing it was to...plunge into the hellish darkness... I ran up against...branches and did not even think of avoiding them. I entangled myself more and more... My hair got caught up... I noticed for the first time that [my] skin was hanging off everywhere, thick and moist from the ash stuck to it. Thinking it must be dirty, I wanted to pull bits of skin off, but that was still more painful... I did not know I had been burnt. — Mrs. Beyerinck (of Ketimbang)

An estimated 20 cubic kilometres (4.8 cu mi) of tephra was deposited. Ash was propelled to an estimated height of 80 km (260,000 ft). It is estimated that as much as 18–21 km^{3} (4.3–5.0 cu mi) of ignimbrite were deposited over 1.1 million km^{2} (420,000 sq mi). Around noon on 27 August 1883, a rain of hot ash fell around Ketimbang (now Kalianda in Lampung Province) in Sumatra, known as 'The Burning Ashes of Ketimbang', killing approximately 1,000 people in Sumatra.

== Aftermath ==
Due to the introduction of telegraph cables, the news of the eruption spread faster than previous notable events, such as the Assassination of Abraham Lincoln. The combination of pyroclastic flows, volcanic ash, tsunamis and earthquakes associated with the Krakatoa eruptions had disastrous regional and global consequences. On the regional scale the effects were limited to some land in Banten, approximately 80 km south, never being repopulated and reverting to jungle, which is now the Ujung Kulon National Park. Ash fell 2,500 km (1,600 mi) away. Huge fields of floating pumice were reported for months after the event. There are numerous reports of groups of human skeletal remains floating across the Indian Ocean on rafts of volcanic pumice and washing up on the east coast of Africa up to a year after the eruption.

An observation made two weeks after the eruption describes the state of the affected areas, where the village of Tjaringin once was.

Thousands of corpses of human beings and also carcasses of animals still await burial, and make their presence apparent by the indescribable stench. They lie in knots and entangled masses impossible to unravel, and often jammed along with coconut stems among all that had served these thousands as dwellings, furniture, farming implements, and adornments for houses and compounds. — From Zeilinga de Boer and Sanders, 2002

=== Death toll ===
The official reported death toll was 36,417. There were no survivors from the 3,000 people on the island of Sebesi.

Official death toll
| Location | Deaths |
|---|---|
| Banten | 21,565 |
| Lampung | 12,466 |
| Batavia | 2,350 |
| Bengkulu | 34 |
| West Java | 2 |
| Total | 36,417 |

=== Geographic effects ===
Evolution of the islands around Krakatoa

In the aftermath of the eruption, it was found that Krakatoa had almost entirely disappeared, except for the southern third. Much of the Rakata cone had been sheared away, leaving behind a 250-metre (820 ft) cliff. Of the northern two-thirds of the island, only a rocky islet named Bootsmansrots ('Bosun's Rock'), a fragment of Danan, was left; Poolsche Hoed had disappeared.

The huge amount of material the volcano deposited drastically altered the ocean floor. The huge amount of ignimbrite deposits largely filled the 30–40-metre-deep (100–130 ft) basin around the mountain. The land masses of Verlaten and Lang islands were increased, as was the western part of the remnant of Rakata. Much of this gained material quickly eroded, but volcanic ash remains a significant part of the geological composition of these islands. The basin was 100 m (300 ft) deep before the eruption, and 200–300 m (700–1,000 ft) after.

Two nearby sandbanks (called Steers and Calmeyer after the two naval officers who investigated them) were built up into islands by ashfall, but the sea later washed them away. Seawater on hot volcanic deposits on Steers and Calmeyer had caused steam to rise, which some mistook for a continued eruption.

=== Global climate ===
The eruption caused a volcanic winter. In the year following the eruption, average Northern Hemisphere summer temperatures fell by 0.4 °C (0.72 °F). The record rainfall that hit Southern California during the water year from July 1883 to June 1884—Los Angeles received 970 millimetres (38.18 in) and San Diego 660 millimetres (25.97 in)—has been attributed to the Krakatoa eruption. There was no El Niño during that period as is usual when heavy rain occurs in Southern California, but many scientists doubt that there was a causal relationship.

The eruption injected a tremendous amount of sulfur dioxide (SO_{2}) gas high into the stratosphere, which was subsequently transported by high-level winds all over the planet. This led to a global increase in sulfuric acid (H_{2}SO_{4}) concentration in high-level cirrus clouds. The resulting increase in cloud reflectivity (or albedo) reflected more incoming light from the sun than usual and cooled the entire planet until the sulfur fell to the ground as acid rain.

=== Global optical effects ===
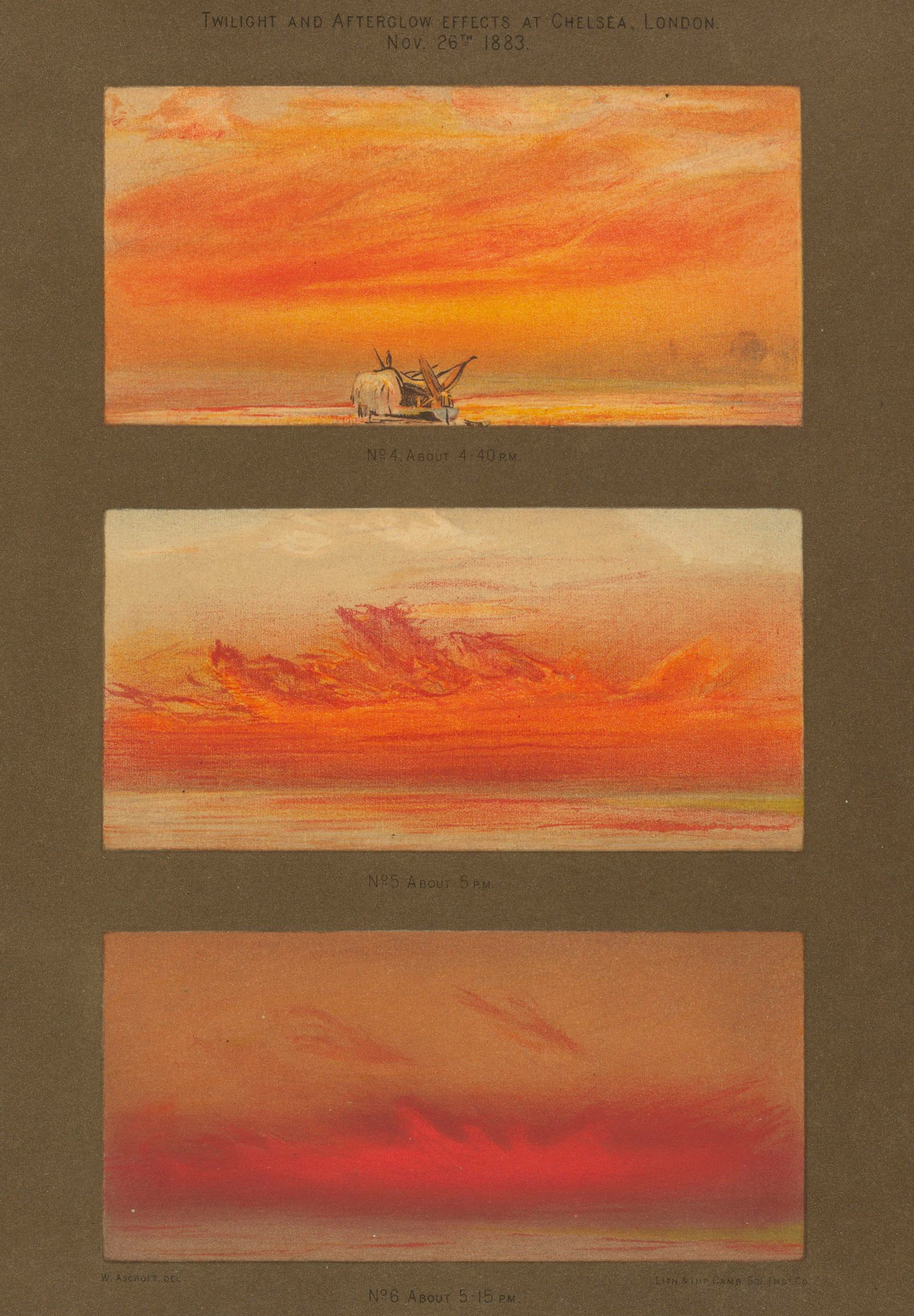
1888 paintings, showcasing the optical effects of the eruption on the sky over time

The 1883 Krakatoa eruption darkened the sky worldwide for years afterwards and produced spectacular sunsets worldwide for many months. British artist William Ascroft made thousands of colour sketches of the red sunsets halfway around the world from Krakatoa in the years after the eruption. The ash caused "such vivid red sunsets that fire engines were called out in New York, Poughkeepsie and New Haven to quench the apparent conflagration". This eruption also produced a Bishop's Ring around the sun by day, and a volcanic purple light at twilight. In 2004, an astronomer proposed the idea that the red sky shown in Edvard Munch's 1893 painting The Scream is an accurate depiction of the sky over Norway after the eruption.

Weather watchers of the time tracked and mapped the effects on the sky. They labelled the phenomenon the "equatorial smoke stream". This was the first identification of what is known today as the jet stream. For several years following the eruption, it was reported that the moon appeared to be blue and sometimes green. This was because some ash clouds were filled with particles about 1 μm wide—the right size to strongly scatter red light while allowing other colours to pass. White moonbeams shining through the clouds emerged blue and sometimes green. People also saw lavender suns and, for the first time, recorded noctilucent clouds.

=== Later activity ===
Although the violent phase of the 1883 eruption was over by the late afternoon of 27 August, after light returned by 29 August, reports continued for months that Krakatoa was still in eruption. Verbeek's committee's earliest duties were to determine if this was true and verify reports of other volcanoes erupting on Java and Sumatra. In general, these were found to be false. Small eruptions, mostly of mud, continued into October 1883. Verbeek discounted any claims of Krakatoa still erupting after mid-October due to steaming of hot material, landslides due to heavy monsoon rains that season, and "hallucinations due to electrical activity" seen from a distance.

No signs of further activity were seen until 1913 when an eruption was reported. An investigation could find no evidence the volcano was awakening. It was determined that what had been mistaken for renewed activity had been a major landslide (possibly the one which formed the second arc to Rakata's cliff).

Examinations after 1930 of bathymetric charts made in 1919 show evidence of a bulge indicative of magma near the surface at the site that became Anak Krakatoa.

== Possible causes ==
The fate of northern Krakatoa has been the subject of some dispute among geologists. It was initially proposed that the island had been blown apart by the force of the eruption. Most of the material deposited by the volcano is magmatic in origin, and the caldera formed by the eruption is not extensively filled with deposits from the 1883 eruption. This indicates that the island subsided into an empty magma chamber at the end of the eruption sequence rather than having been destroyed during the eruptions.

Based on the findings of contemporary investigators, the established hypotheses assume that part of the island subsided before the first explosions on the morning of 27 August. This forced the volcano's vents to be below sea level, causing:

- Major flooding which created a series of phreatic explosions (interaction of ground water and magma).
- Seawater to cool the magma enough for it to crust over and produce a "pressure cooker" effect that was relieved only when explosive pressures were reached.

Geological evidence does not support the assumption that only subsidence before the explosion was the cause. For instance, the pumice and ignimbrite deposits are not of a kind consistent with a magma-seawater interaction. These findings have led to other hypotheses:

- an underwater land slump or partial subsidence suddenly exposed the highly pressurized magma chamber, opening a pathway for seawater to enter the magma chamber and setting the stage for a magma-seawater interaction.

Numerical model of hydrovolcanic explosion of Krakatoa and Tsunami generation

- the final explosions may have been caused by magma mixing: a sudden infusion of hot basaltic magma into the cooler and lighter magma in the chamber below the volcano. This would have resulted in a rapid and unsustainable increase in pressure, leading to a cataclysmic explosion. Evidence for this theory is the existence of pumice consisting of light and dark material, the dark material being of much hotter origin. Such material reportedly is less than five per cent of the content of the Krakatoa ignimbrite, and some investigators have rejected this as a prime cause of the 27 August explosions.

A numerical model for a Krakatoa hydrovolcanic explosion and the resulting tsunami was described by Mader & Gittings, in 2006. A high wall of water is formed that is initially higher than 100 metres driven by the shocked water, basalt and air.

== In popular culture ==
- The explosion has been theorized to be a source of inspiration for Edvard Munch's 1893 painting The Scream. The reddish sky in the background is the artist's memory of the effects of the powerful volcanic eruption of Krakatoa, which deeply tinted sunset skies red in parts of the Western hemisphere for months during 1883 and 1884, about a decade before Munch painted The Scream.
- The explosion plays a pivotal role in Don Rosa's comic The Cowboy Captain of the Cutty Sark, where Scrooge McDuck witnesses the explosion and turns it to his advantage.
- In The Dresden Files, the explosion is revealed to have been caused by Ebenezar McCoy in his role as 'the Blackstaff', the White Council's assassin, along with a number of other events, including the Tunguska event.
- The 1883 eruption is a key plot device in the 1947 fiction novel The Twenty-One Balloons. In the book, Krakatoa is portrayed as an island of great diamond wealth populated by a utopian society.
- The 1883 eruption is among the Transformer events covered by the Order of the Witwiccans in Transformers: The Last Knight.

== See also ==
- 2022 Hunga Tonga–Hunga Haʻapai eruption and tsunami – Similar-sized eruption in 2022
- Fair Wind to Java
- Krakatit
- Krakatoa documentary and historical materials
- Krakatoa, East of Java
- List of natural disasters by death toll
- List of volcanoes in Indonesia
- The Devil at 4 O'Clock
- The Twenty-One Balloons
- Vog
- The Time Tunnel "Crack Of Doom" (1966)
