= Krakatoa documentary and historical materials =

Material about the Krakatoa eruption

Krakatoa, in the Sunda Strait in Indonesia, has attracted a significant literature and media response to the 1883 eruption and subsequent events in the vicinity.

== Nonfiction ==
=== Books ===
- Alfred, E. & Seward, A.C., The New Flora of the Volcanic Island of Krakatau, (reissued by Cambridge University Press 2009, ISBN 978-1-108-00433-6)
- C. A. Backer; The Problem of Krakatao as Seen By a Botanist (1929). Examines the "Krakatau problem"- whether or not all life was destroyed by the 1883 eruption.
- Rupert Furneaux; Krakatoa (1964). This came out just a few years before the theory of plate tectonics was adopted.
- David Keys; Catastrophe: An Investigation into the Origins of the Modern World (1999).
- Mohammad Saleh; Syair Lampung Karam (Singapore, 1883); the only known account written by a local in the Malay language, a poem.
- Self, Stephen; Rampino, Michael R. (1981). "The 1883 eruption of Krakatau". Nature. 294 (5843): 699–704. Bibcode:1981Natur.294..699S. doi:10.1038/294699a0. S2CID 4340524.
- Tom Simkin & Richard S. Fiske, (editors), Krakatau 1883: The Volcanic Eruption and Its Effects was written for the centenary of the event and provides source material that had previously been unavailable in English.
- Symons, G.J. (ed); The Eruption of Krakatoa and Subsequent Phenomena (Report of the Krakatoa Committee of the Royal Society) London (1888)
- Ian Thornton; Krakatau: The Destruction and Reassembly of an Island Ecosystem (1996)
- Wilson, Edward O. (1999). The Diversity of Life. New York, NY: W. W. Norton & Company. p. 425. ISBN 0-393-31940-7.
- Rogier Verbeek's initial report on the eruption ran in Nature in May 1884. His book Krakatau was printed in 1885 in Dutch; a French translation (called Krakatau Atlas) is in two volumes.
- Simon Winchester; Krakatoa: The Day the World Exploded, 27 August 1883 explores the eruption of Krakatoa and the history of the region, the early spice trade, the growth of colonial governments, explains the geology of volcanos and describes in detail the series of eruptions and tsunamis and their effects around the globe.

=== Film ===
- Krakatoa, a short (26 min) 1933 teaching film about the volcano that won the Academy Award for Best Short Subject, Novelty for its producer Joe Rock. This movie was notable for overwhelming the sound systems of the cinemas of the time. In Australia, the distributors insisted on a power output of 10 watts RMS as a minimum for cinemas wishing to show the movie. This was then considered a large system, and forced many cinemas to upgrade. A revised version was made in 1966 for the Library of Congress.

There are several recent videos of Krakatoa uploaded onto YouTube showing the inside of its crater and it erupting.

=== Television ===
- "Ultimate Blast: Eruption at Krakatau" has been aired on Discovery Channel, as part of the Moments in Time series.
- The 1883 eruption is reconstructed in the BBC Television docudrama Krakatoa: The Last Days, first broadcast in May 2006. It was broadcast in the U.S. as Krakatoa: Volcano of Destruction on the Discovery Channel.
- The 2007 episode "Krakatoa's Revenge" of The History Channel's disaster-themed documentary series Mega Disasters features the volcano's active history and imminent future.
- The 2009 episode "Krakatoa" of History's geology-based documentary series How the Earth Was Made also chronicles the geologic history of Krakatoa.
- In a 1991 episode of the TV show Seinfeld, Jerry (in 1985) is tricked by Kramer into donating money to the Krakatoa relief fund, even though it erupted 102 years earlier.
