= Krakatoa archipelago =

Archipelago in the Sunda Strait, Indonesia

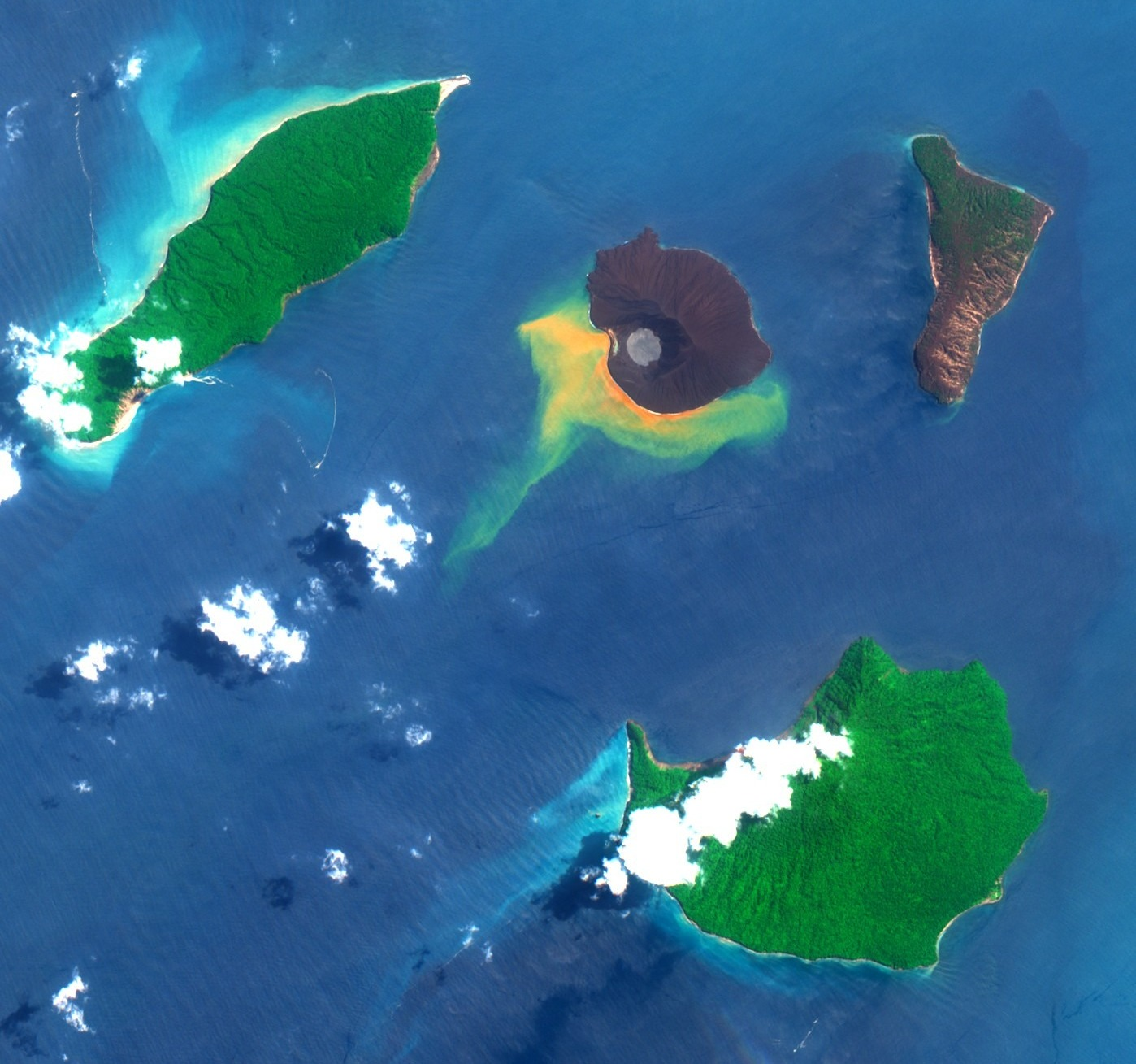
- Satellite view of the Krakatoa archipelago, with Anak Krakatoa in the centre.

- Location within Indonesia

Geography
- Location: Sunda Strait
- Coordinates: 6.102°S 105.423°E
- Total islands: 4

Administration
- Indonesia

The Krakatoa archipelago is a small uninhabited archipelago of volcanic islands formed by the Krakatoa stratovolcano located in the Sunda Strait, nestled between the much larger islands of Java and Sumatra. As of 2018, the archipelago consists of four main islands: Verlaten (a.k.a. Sertung) to the northwest, Lang (a.k.a. Lesser Krakatoa, Rakata Kecil, or Panjang) to the northeast, Rakata (what remains the main island) to the south, and the currently volcanically active Anak Krakatoa in the north-centre. Together, the islands are a part of the Indonesian island arc system, created by the northeastward subduction of the Indo-Australian plate. As part of a dynamic volcanic system, the islands have been continuously reshaped throughout recorded history, most notably in the 1883 eruption of Krakatoa.

Administratively, the Krakatoa archipelago lies entirely within Lampung, Indonesia, and forms a part of Ujung Kulon National Park.

== Geology ==
The change in topology after the 1883 eruption

Krakatoa is an active stratovolcano located in Indonesia, and lying on the far western rim of the Pacific Ring of Fire. Krakatoa is a notably powerful volcano, with the 1883 eruption being one of the deadliest and most destructive volcanic events in all of recorded history.

== Geography ==
=== Current islands ===
- Verlaten Island (a.k.a. Sertung) – Verlaten is a rather low island with a hill in the middle. Other than some minor collapse in the southeast (closest to the main island of Krakatoa), Verlaten suffered little damage in the 1883 eruption. Instead, it grew almost 3 times in area due to pumice fall, although most of the gain was quickly eroded away. After the 1883 eruption, Verlaten developed a low spit of land to the north-east with a brackish lake near the end. This lake became a waterfowl haven but has since been breached by wave erosion.
- Lang Island (a.k.a. Lesser Krakatoa, Rakata Kecil, or Panjang) – Lang, by contrast, is quite hilly. It suffered only slightly in the 1883 eruption; it actually grew in area from massive pumice fall, although most of the additional area washed away within several years.
- Rakata (a.k.a. Greater Krakatoa) – Standing 813 metres (2,667 ft) tall, it was the largest and southernmost of the three volcanoes that formed the now destroyed island of "Krakatoa" (the others being Danan and Perboewatan), and the only one not obliterated in the eruption of 1883. However, Rakata did lose its northern half in that eruption – leaving just its southern half. The exposed cliff is of a large exposed dike terminating in a large lenticular extrusion at the middle of the almost vertical cliff. The feature has been called "the Eye of Krakatoa."
- Anak Krakatoa – Following the 1883 eruption, Krakatoa's lava dome was entirely beneath the surface of the ocean. However, in December 1927, a volcanic eruption led to a new island that rose above the waterline. The eruptions were initially of pumice and ash, and that island and the two islands that followed were quickly eroded away by the sea. Eventually a fourth island named Anak Krakatau (meaning "child of Krakatoa" in Indonesian) broke water in August 1930, and produced lava flows more quickly than the waves could erode them.

=== Former islands ===
- Poolsche Hoed (Dutch: "Polish Hat") – a former small rocky islet between Krakatoa Island and Lang Island, which was destroyed in the 1883 eruption. The name was apparently derived from its appearance from the sea: a sharply angled point, similar to the old-styled caps worn by Poles.
- Calmeyer (sometimes spelled Calmejer) – a former island created from volcanic products from the 1883 eruption of Krakatoa, in the Sebesi Channel between Krakatoa Island and Sebesi, which was a fairly shallow area (about 20 meters before the eruption). Calmeyer was somewhat higher than Steers, at about 6.5 meters at the highest spot. The two rather quickly were eroded away by wave action; Calmeyer had broken up into about half a dozen smaller islets by the time of Rogier Verbeek's visit in October 1883, and was gone within two years. Sandbanks bearing the names still remain.
- Steers (island) – a former island created from volcanic products from the 1883 eruption of Krakatoa, in the Sebesi Channel between Krakatoa Island and Sebesi. Steers was the slightly larger of the two, but never was more than three meters above the waterline. They were rather quickly eroded away by wave action, and were gone within two years. Sandbanks bearing the names still remain.

== Gallery ==
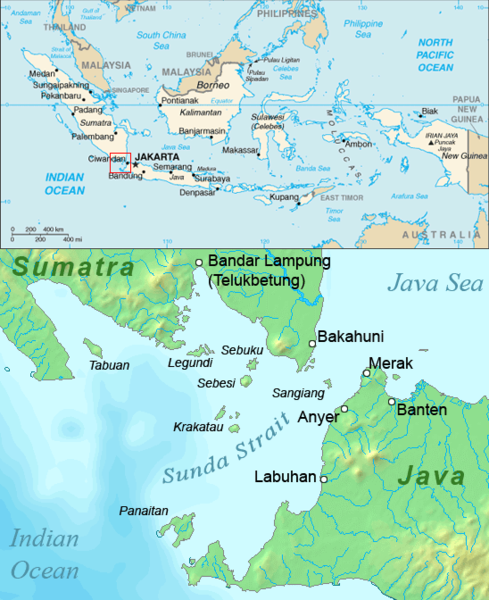
Map of the Sunda Strait, Indonesia

Evolution map of the Krakatoa archipelago, between 1880 and 2018

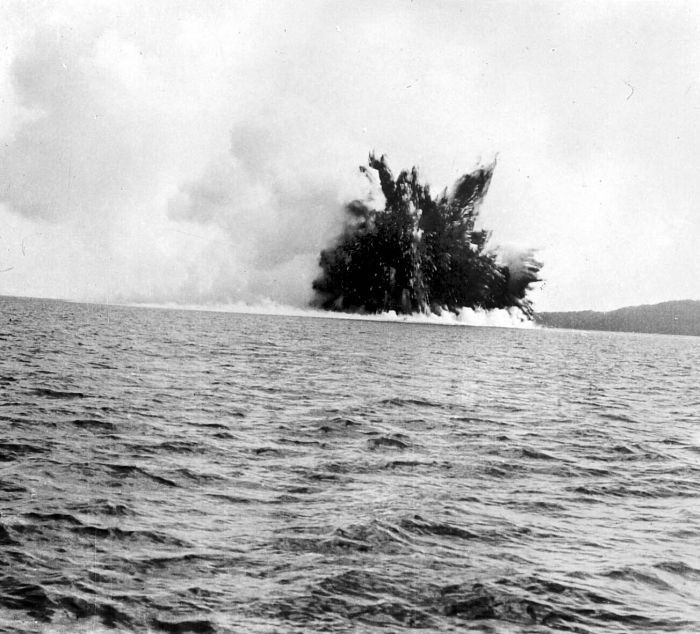
Birth of Anak Krakatoa in c. 1928

Biogeographical map (French) of the vegetation in the Krakatoa archipelago in 1992

== See also ==
- Sebesi
