= Alex & Nilusha =

Australian jazz group

Alex & Nilusha was an Australian jazz collaboration led by percussionist Alex Pertout and vocalist Nilusha Dassenaike. Their work incorporated the influences of their Latin American (Pertout) and South Asian (Dassenaike) heritages.

Recordings featured various Australian and international guests, including American guitarist Mike Stern, Egyptian percussionist Hossam Ramzy, Australian pianist Paul Grabowsky, Indigenous Australian singer-songwriter Tom E. Lewis, Latin jazz flautist Dave Valentin, Australian guitarist Leonard Grigoryan, Puerto Rican pianist Edsel Gomez, Cuban Tres master Pancho Amat, Cuban violinist William Roblejo, and trumpeter Miroslav Bukovsky.

ABC Jazz named their debut album Moments in Time as Album of the Week and listed it among the Top 5 Australian Jazz Albums of 2012. ABC Radio National featured the album on The New Music Show, with Andrew Ford interviewing them about how their heritages impact their style and highlighting the cultural importance of the album. Their 2014 release Tales To Tell was awarded the ‘Premio Internacional’ at the 2015 XIX CubaDisco Music Awards in Havana, Cuba.

== Members ==
=== Alex Pertout ===
Alex Pertout is from Santiago, Chile. He lived in Gorizia, Italy during his teenage years, and grew up in Melbourne, Australia.

Pertout has recorded on multiple albums and motion picture soundtracks. Some of these include albums by Powderfinger and Daryl Braithwaite, and soundtracks such as Crocodile Dundee and It Runs in the Family.

Pertout is a founding member of the Australian Art Orchestra led by Paul Grabowsky. Pertout has produced albums and is the author of Sight Reading: The Rhythm Book published internationally by Mel Bay. He is a senior lecturer in music at the Faculty of VCA and MCM, University of Melbourne.

=== Nilusha Dassenaike ===
Nilusha Dassenaike was born in Colombo, Sri Lanka, and moved with her family to Melbourne at the age of five months.

Dassenaike has performed across many genres and has collaborated with artists such as Don Burrows, James Morrison, and Renee Geyer. Dassenaike has worked on television shows such as Australia's Got Talent and Singing Bee. She was featured in the theme song for the series Canal Road.

Since 2021, Dassenaike has performed and toured with Tina Arena. She also opened for Billy Joel at the Melbourne Cricket Ground on December 10, 2022.

== Discography ==
=== Albums ===
- Moments in Time (2012)
- Tales To Tell (2014)
- Afterglow (2016)

=== Singles ===
- “Falling” (ft. Mile Stern) (2013)
