= Krakatoa =

Volcanic caldera in the Sunda Strait, Indonesia

- Krakatau
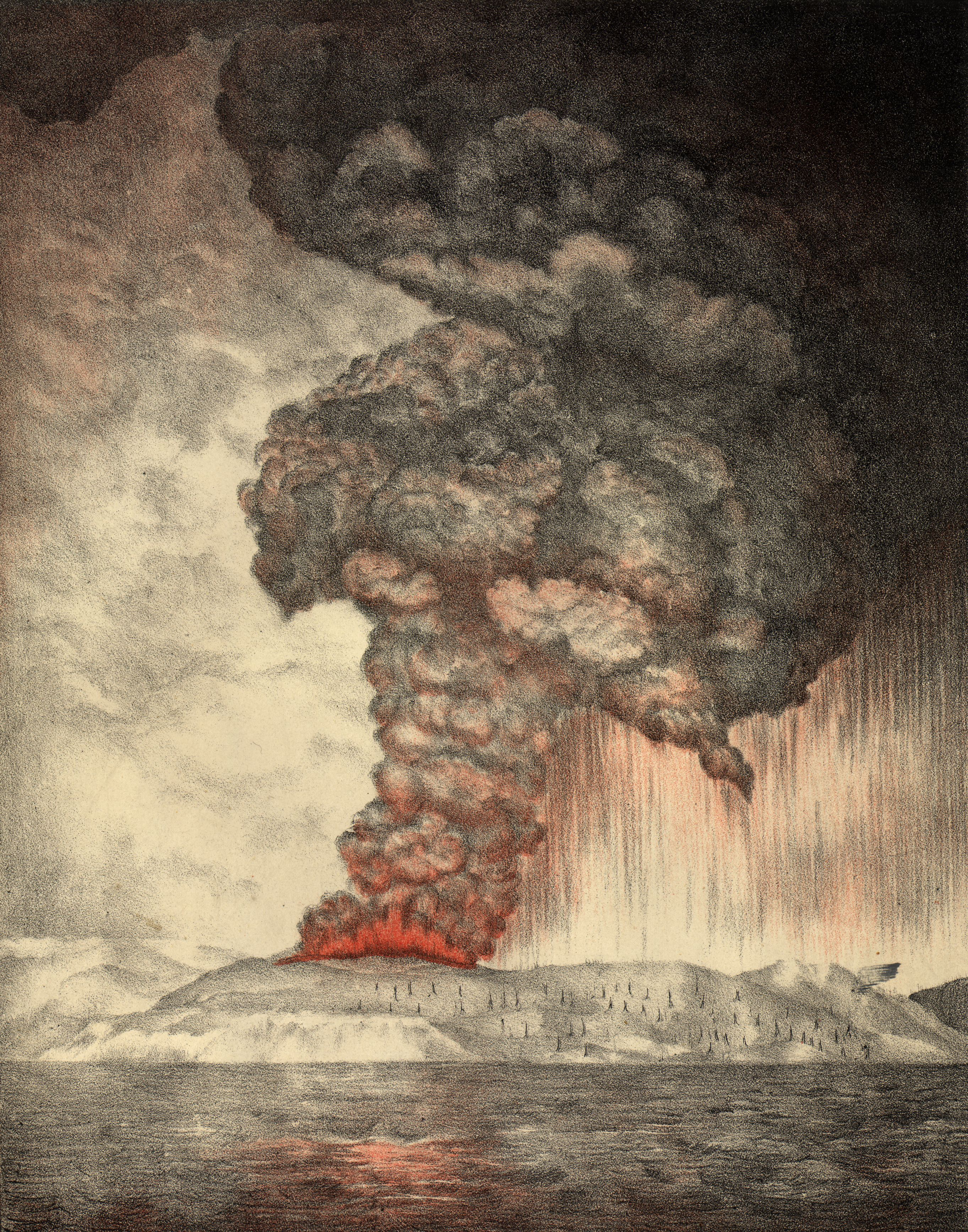
- A lithograph of the 1883 eruption of Krakatoa

Highest point
- Elevation: 813 m (2,667 ft)
- Prominence: 814 m (2,671 ft)
- Isolation: 21.71 km (13.49 mi) to Sebesi
- Listing: Spesial Ribu
- Coordinates: 6°06′07″S 105°25′23″E

Naming
- Native name: Krakatau (Indonesian)

Geography
- Location within Indonesia
- Location: Indonesia

Geology
- Mountain type: Caldera
- Last eruption: September 2026 (Anak Krakatoa)

Krakatoa (/ˌkrɑːkəˈtoʊə, ˌkræk-/), also transcribed Krakatau (/-ˈtaʊ/), is a caldera in the Sunda Strait between the islands of Java and Sumatra in the Indonesian province of Lampung. The caldera is part of a volcanic island group (Krakatoa archipelago) comprising four islands. Two of them are known as Lang and Verlaten; another, Rakata, is the only remnant of an island, also called Krakatoa, mostly destroyed by an eruption in 1883 that created the caldera.

In 1927, a fourth island, Anak Krakatoa ("Child of Krakatoa"), emerged from the caldera formed in 1883. There has been new eruptive activity since the late 20th century, with a large collapse causing the 2018 Sunda Strait tsunami. In the 2020s, a new cinder cone grew out of its collapse scar from eruptions.

== Historical significance ==
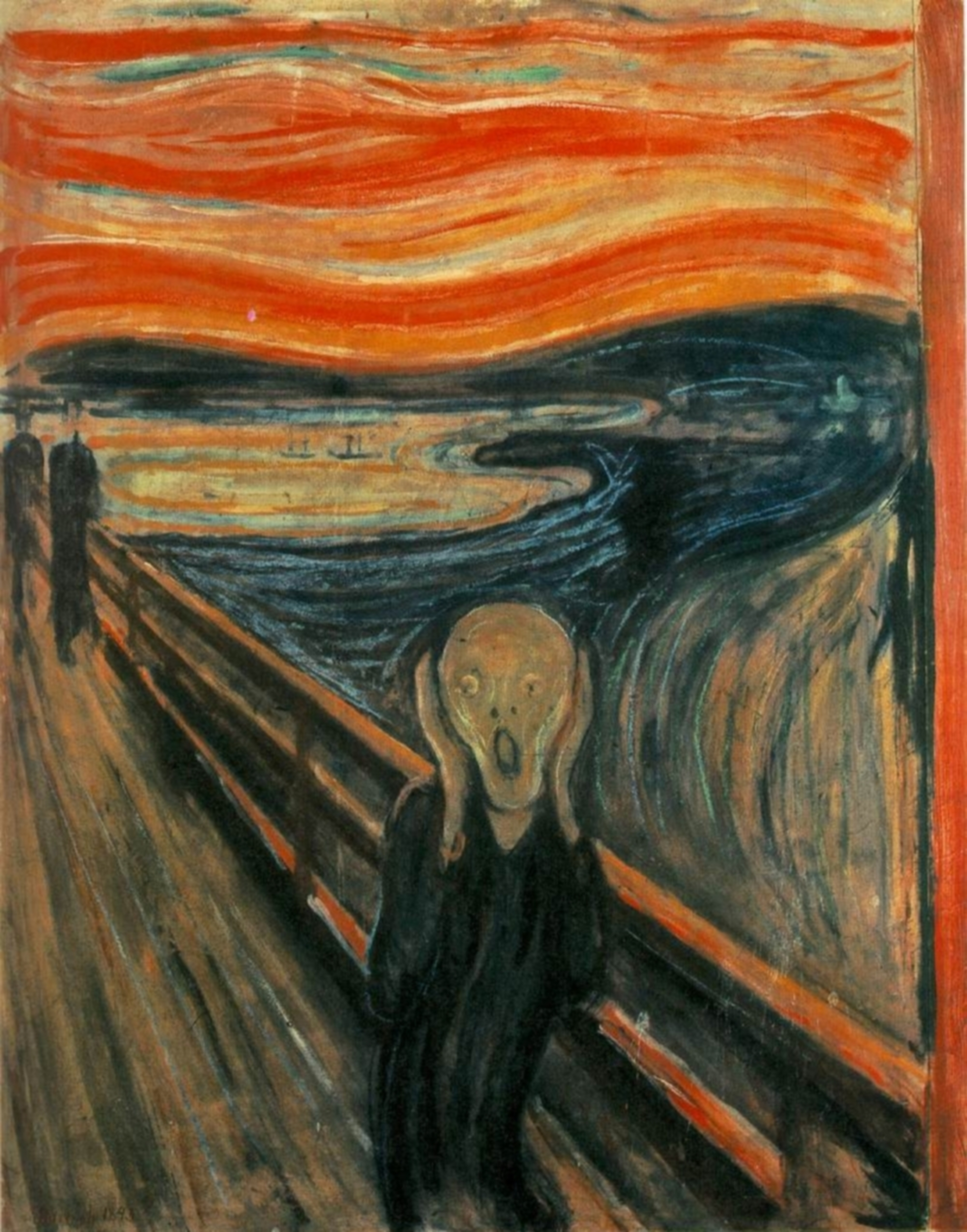
In 2004, an astronomer suggested that the blood-red sky shown in Edvard Munch's famous 1893 painting The Scream depicts the sky over Norway after the eruption.

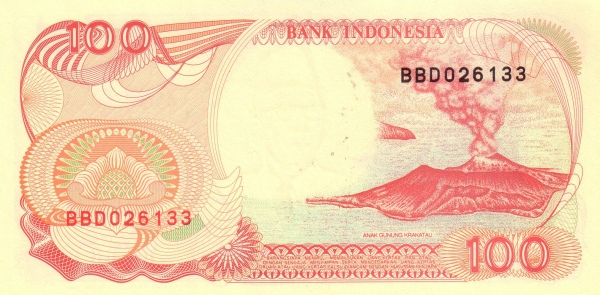
Krakatoa featured in 100-rupiah banknote

The most notable eruptions of Krakatoa culminated in a series of massive explosions over 26–27 August 1883, which were among the most violent volcanic events in recorded history.

With an estimated volcanic explosivity index of 6, the eruption was equivalent to 200 megatons of TNT (840 PJ)—about 13,000 times the nuclear yield of the Little Boy bomb (13 to 16 kt) dropped on Hiroshima, Japan, during World War II, and four times the yield of Tsar Bomba, the most powerful nuclear device ever detonated at 50 Mt.

The 1883 eruption ejected approximately 25 km^{3} (6 cubic miles) of rock. The cataclysmic explosion was heard 3,600 km (2,200 mi) away in Alice Springs, Australia, and on the island of Rodrigues near Mauritius, 4,780 km (2,970 mi) to the west.

According to the official records of the Dutch East Indies colony, 165 villages and towns were destroyed near Krakatoa, and 132 were seriously damaged. At least 36,417 people died, and many more thousands were injured, mostly from the tsunamis that followed the explosion. The eruption destroyed two-thirds of the island of Krakatoa.

Eruptions in the area since 1927 have built a new island at the same location, named Anak Krakatau (which is Indonesian for "Child of Krakatoa"). Periodic eruptions have continued since, with recent eruptions in 2009, 2010, 2011, and 2012, and a major collapse in 2018. In late 2011, this island had a radius of roughly 2 kilometres (1.2 mi), and a highest point of about 324 metres (1,063 ft) above sea level, growing five metres (16 ft) each year. In 2017, the height of Anak Krakatau was reported as over 400 m (1,300 ft) above sea level; following a collapse in December 2018, the height was reduced to 110 meters (361 ft). The most recent eruption at Anak Krakatau took place in September 2026, beginning on 4 September 2026.

== Etymology ==
One of the earliest mentions of the name Krakatoa is in the Old Sundanese text Bujangga Manik, which was probably written in western Java in the late 15th century. In it, Krakatoa is called "the island of Rakata, a mountain in the middle of the sea" (pulo Rakata gunung ti tengah sagara, f. 27v). There are earlier descriptions in European sources of an island in the Sunda Strait with a "pointed mountain", but the earliest mention of Krakatoa by name in the western world was on a 1611 map by Lucas Janszoon Waghenaer, who labelled the island "Pulo Carcata" (pulo is the Sundanese word for "island"). About two dozen variants have been found, including Crackatouw, Cracatoa, and Krakatao (in an older Portuguese-based spelling). The first known appearance of the spelling Krakatau was by Wouter Schouten, who passed by "the high tree-covered island of Krakatau" in October 1658.

The origin of the Indonesian name Krakatau is uncertain. The main theories are:

- From Sanskrit karka or karkaṭa or karkaṭaka, meaning "lobster" or "crab". The abbreviated form rakaṭa also means "crab" in the Old Javanese language. The fact that the earliest recorded mentions of the word closely resemble the pronunciation of these words for crab (rakata in Bujangga Manik and carcata in Waghenaer's map) makes this Sanskrit etymology the most likely origin of the word.
- Onomatopoeia, imitating the noise made by cockatoos (Kakatoes) which used to inhabit the island. However, Van den Berg points out that these birds are found only in the "eastern part of the archipelago" (meaning the Lesser Sundas, east of Java, on the other side of the Wallace Line).
- The closest Malay word is kelakatu, meaning "white-winged ant". Furneaux points out that in pre-1883 maps, Krakatoa does somewhat resemble an ant seen from above, with Lang and Verlaten lying to the sides like wings.
- Van den Berg (1884) recites a story that Krakatau was the result of a linguistic error. According to the legend, a visiting ship's captain asked a local inhabitant the island's name, and the latter replied, "Kaga tau" (Aku enggak tahu)—a Jakartan/Betawinese slang phrase meaning "I don't know". This story is largely discounted; it closely resembles other linguistic myths about the origin of the word kangaroo and the name of the Yucatán Peninsula.

The Smithsonian Institution's Global Volcanism Program cites the Indonesian name, Krakatau, as the correct name, but says that Krakatoa is often employed.

== Geographical setting ==
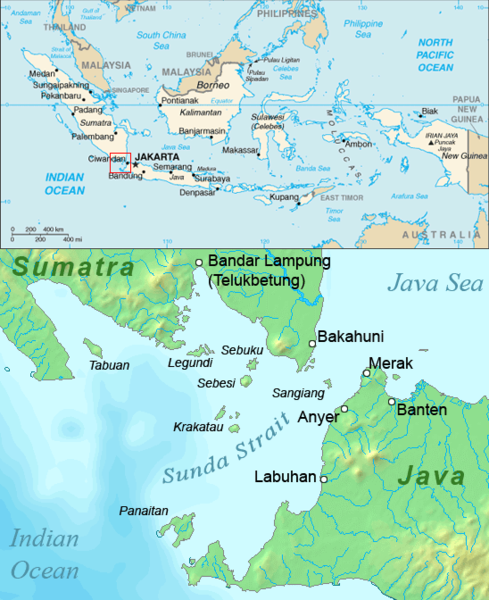
The Sunda Strait

Indonesia has over 130 active volcanoes, the most of any nation. They make up the axis of the Indonesian island arc system produced by northeastward subduction of the Indo-Australian Plate. Most of them are on Indonesia's two largest islands, Java and Sumatra. These two islands are separated by the Sunda Strait, at a bend in the axis of the island arc. Krakatau is directly above the subduction zone of the Eurasian Plate and the Indo-Australian Plate where the plate boundaries make a sharp change of direction, possibly resulting in an unusually weak crust in the region.

== Pre-1883 history ==
At some point in prehistory, an earlier caldera-forming eruption had occurred, leaving as remnants the islands of Verlaten (or Sertung); Lang (also known as Rakata Kecil, or Panjang); Poolsche Hoed ("Polish Hat"); and the base of Rakata. Later, at least two more cones (Perboewatan and Danan) formed and eventually joined with Rakata, forming the main island of Krakatoa. At the time of the 1883 eruption, the Krakatoa group comprised Lang, Verlaten, and Krakatoa itself, an island 9 km (5.6 mi) long by 5 km (3.1 mi) wide. There were also the tree-covered islet near Lang (Poolsche Hoed) and several small rocky islets or banks between Krakatoa and Verlaten.

There were three volcanic cones on Krakatoa Island: Rakata, (820 m or 2,690 ft) to the south; Danan, (450 m or 1,480 ft) near the center; and Perboewatan, (120 m or 390 ft) to the north.

=== AD 416 event ===
The Javanese Book of Kings (Pustaka Raja), a 19th-century compilation of historical traditions from Central Java, records that in the year 338 Śaka (416 AD):

A thundering sound was heard from the mountain Batuwara [now called Pulosari, an extinct volcano in Bantam, the nearest to the Sunda Strait] which was answered by a similar noise from Kapi, lying westward of the modern Bantam [(Banten) is the westernmost province in Java, so this seems to indicate that Krakatoa is meant]. A great glowing fire, which reached the sky, came out of the last-named mountain; the whole world was greatly shaken and violent thundering, accompanied by heavy rain and storms took place, but not only did not this heavy rain extinguish the eruption of the fire of the mountain Kapi, but augmented the fire; the noise was fearful, at last the mountain Kapi with a tremendous roar burst into pieces and sank into the deepest of the earth. The water of the sea rose and inundated the land, the country to the east of the mountain Batuwara, to the mountain Rajabasa [the most southerly volcano in Sumatra], was inundated by the sea; the inhabitants of the northern part of the Sunda country to the mountain Rajabasa were drowned and swept away with all property ... The water subsided but the land on which Kapi stood became sea, and Java and Sumatra were divided into two parts.

The Pustaka Raja does not draw on primary sources for its description of this event, and its historical reliability is highly dubious. It is therefore impossible to verify its description of this eruption. There is no geological evidence presented that substantiates this eruption. David Keys, Ken Wohletz, and others have postulated that a violent volcanic eruption, possibly of Krakatoa, in 535 was responsible for the global climate changes of 535–536. Drilling projects in Sunda Strait ruled out any possibility that an eruption took place in 535 AD.

=== Middle Ages ===
Ian Thornton mentions that Krakatoa was known as "The Fire Mountain" during Java's Sailendra dynasty, with records of seven eruptive events between the 9th and 16th centuries. These have been tentatively dated as having occurred in 850, 950, 1050, 1150, 1320, and 1530.

=== 1680 ===
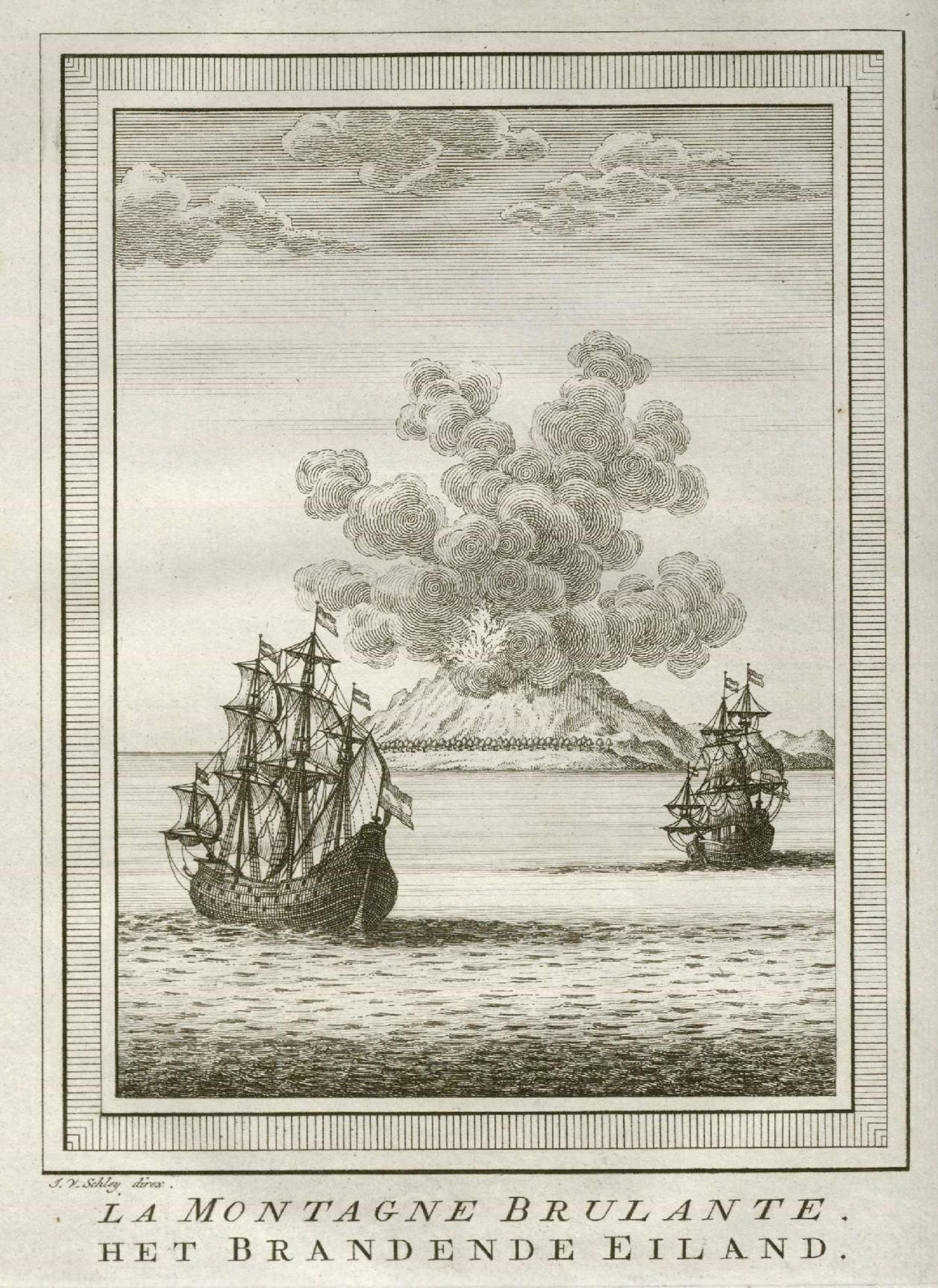
Simon Winchester maintains that the 1680 eruption was depicted in this eighteenth-century Dutch etching.

In February 1681, Johann Wilhelm Vogel, a Dutch mining engineer at Salida, Sumatra (near Padang), on his way to Batavia (now Jakarta) passed through the Sunda Strait. In his diary he wrote:

...I saw with amazement that the island of Krakatoa, on my first trip to Sumatra [June 1679] completely green and healthy with trees, lay completely burnt and barren in front of our eyes and that at four locations was throwing up large chunks of fire. And when I asked the ship's Captain when the aforementioned island had erupted, he told me that this had happened in May 1680 ... He showed me a piece of pumice as big as his fist.

Vogel spent several months in Batavia, returning to Sumatra in November 1681. On the same ship were several other Dutch travellers, including Elias Hesse, a writer. Hesse's journal reports:

...on the 19th [of November 1681] we again lifted anchor and proceeded first to the north of us to the island of Sleepzie (Sebesi), uninhabited, ... and then still north of the island of Krakatou, which erupted about a year ago and also is uninhabited. The rising smoke column of this island can be seen from miles away; we were with our ship very close to shore and we could see the trees sticking out high on the mountain, and which looked completely burned, but we could not see the fire itself.

The eruption was also reported by a Bengali sea captain, who wrote of the event later, but had not recorded it at the time in the ship's log. Neither Vogel nor Hesse mention Krakatoa in any real detail in their other passages, and no other travellers at the time mention an eruption or evidence of one. (In November 1681, a pepper crop was being offered for sale by inhabitants.)

In his 2003 book Krakatoa: The Day the World Exploded: August 27, 1883, Simon Winchester writes that the 1680 eruption was depicted in an 18th-century etching by Dutch cartographer Jan van Schley called Het Brandende Eiland ("The Burning Island"): "it was a depiction, without a doubt, of the otherwise little-chronicled eruption that supposedly took place in 1680."

In 1880, Verbeek investigated a fresh unweathered lava flow at the northern coast of Perboewatan, which he claimed could not have been more than two centuries old.

=== Visit by HMS Discovery ===
In February 1780, the crews of HMS Resolution (1771) and HMS Discovery (1774), on the way home after Captain James Cook's death in Hawaiʻi, stopped for a few days on Krakatoa. They found a freshwater and a hot spring on the island. They called the natives who then lived on the island "friendly" and made several sketches. (In his journal, John Ledyard calls the island "Cocoterra".)

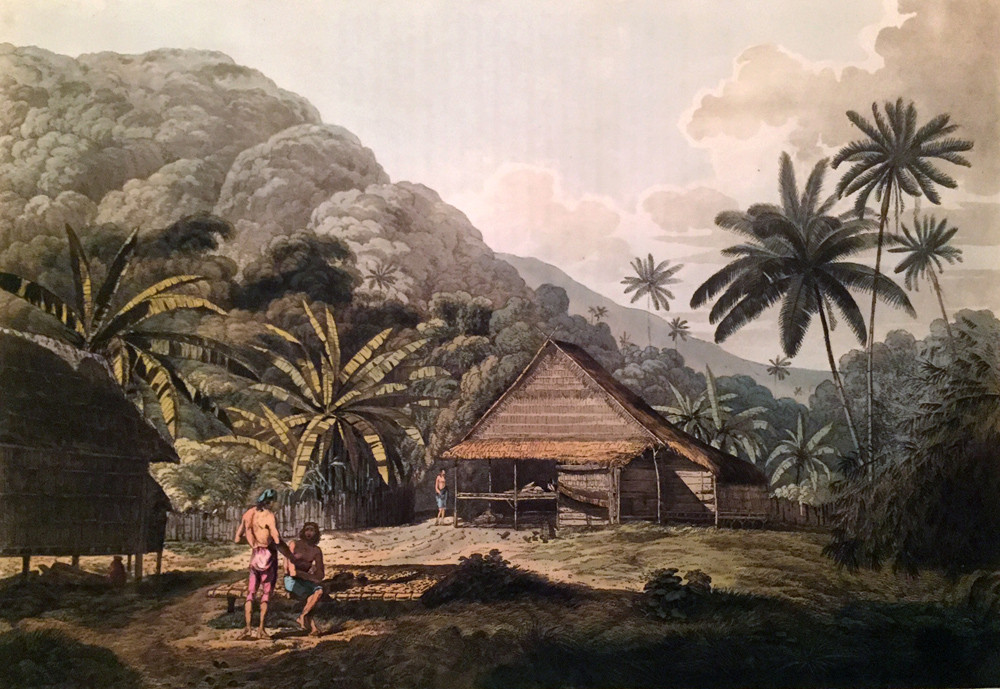
In 1780, crew members of HMS Discovery found the island as a friendly place whose vegetation was dense and lush; illustration by John Webber (1751–1793)

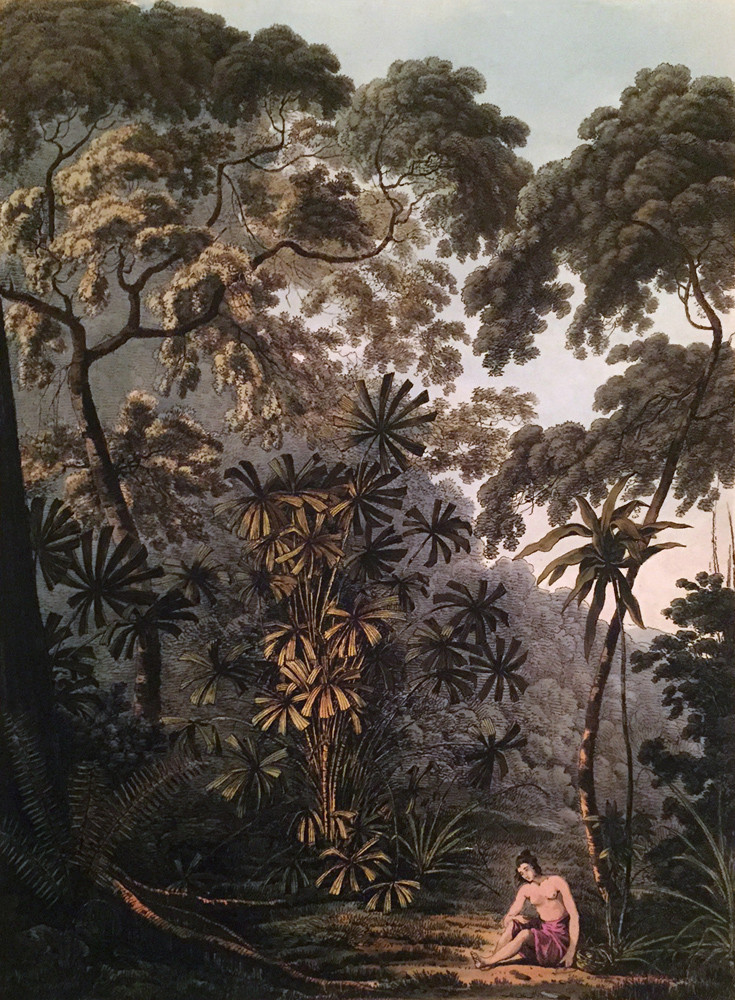
Large fan palm in the island; illustration by John Webber (1751–1793)

=== Visit by USS Peacock ===
Edmund Roberts calls the island Crokatoa in his journal. A paraphrased account follows:

On 8 September 1832, US sloop-of-war Peacock anchored off the north end, also visiting Lang Island, in search of inhabitants, fresh water and yams. It was found difficult to land anywhere, due to a heavy surf and to the coral having extended itself to a considerable distance from the shore. Hot springs boiling furiously up, through many fathoms of water, were found on the eastern side of Krakatoa, 150 feet (46 m) from the shore. Roberts, Captain Geisinger, and marine lieutenant Fowler visited Forsaken island, having mistaken the singing of locusts for the sound of running water. The boat glided over crystal clear water, over an extensive and highly beautiful submarine garden. Corals of every shape and hue were there, some resembling sunflowers and mushrooms, others cabbages from 1 to 36 inches (3 to 91 cm) in diameter, while a third type bore a striking likeness to the rose. The hillsides were typical of tropical climate; large flocks of parrots, monkeys in great variety, wild-mango and orange groves—a superb scene of plants and flowers of every description, glowing in vivid tints of purple, red, blue, brown, and green—but not water or provisions.

=== Dutch activity ===
In 1620, the Dutch set up a naval station on the islands and somewhat later a shipyard was built. Sometime in the late 17th century, an attempt was made to establish a pepper plantation on Krakatoa, but the islands were generally ignored by the Dutch East India Company. In 1809, a penal colony was established at an unspecified location, which was in operation for about a decade. By the 1880s, the islands were without permanent inhabitants; the nearest settlement was the nearby island of Sebesi (about 12 km or 7.5 mi away) with a population of 3,000.

Several surveys and mariners' charts were made, and the islands were little explored or studied. An 1854 map of the islands was used in an English chart, which shows some difference from a Dutch chart made in 1874. In July 1880, Rogier Verbeek made an official survey of the islands, but was allowed to spend only a few hours there. He was able to collect samples from several places, and his investigation later proved important in judging the geological impact of the 1883 eruption.

== 1883 eruption ==
Two-thirds of the original Krakatoa Island was obliterated by the 1883 eruption.

While seismic activity around the volcano was intense in the years preceding the 1883 eruption, a series of lesser eruptions began on 20 May 1883. The volcano released huge plumes of steam and ash until late August.

On 27 August, a series of four huge explosions almost destroyed the island. The explosions were so violent that they were heard 3,110 km (1,930 mi) away in Perth, Western Australia, and on the island of Rodrigues near Mauritius, 4,800 km (3,000 mi) away. The pressure wave from the third and most violent explosion was recorded on barographs worldwide. Several barographs recorded the wave seven times over the course of five days: four times with the wave travelling away from the volcano to its antipodal point, and three times travelling back to the volcano; the wave rounded the globe three and a half times. Ash was propelled to a height of 80 km (260,000 ft). People within 160 kilometres (100 mi) were reportedly deafened by the eruption, experiencing intense ear pain and permanent hearing loss. At this distance the sound intensity was measured at 172 dB, roughly equivalent to the sound produced by the Space Shuttle's rockets during takeoff. A ship about 64 kilometres (40 mi) from the island experienced a pressure wave roughly equal to 190 dB, rupturing the eardrums of over half the crew.

The combined effects of pyroclastic flows, volcanic ashes, and tsunamis had disastrous results in the region and worldwide. The Dutch authorities recorded a death toll of 36,417; some sources estimate it at more than 120,000. There are numerous documented reports of groups of human skeletons floating across the Indian Ocean on rafts of volcanic pumice and washing up on the east coast of Africa up to a year after the eruption. Summer temperatures in the northern hemisphere fell by an average of 0.4 °C (0.72 °F) that year.

== Aftermath ==
Evolution of the Krakatoa archipelago from 1880 to 2018. Anak Krakatoa ("Child of Krakatoa") grows continually after 1927.

=== Anak Krakatau ===
In his report on the eruption, Verbeek predicted that any new activity would occur in the region that had been between Perboewatan and Danan. This prediction came true on 29 December 1927, when a submarine lava dome in the area of Perboewatan showed evidence of eruptions (another event in the same area had been reported in June 1927). A new island volcano rose above the waterline a few days later. The eruptions were initially of pumice and ash, and that island and the two islands that followed quickly eroded away. Eventually, a fourth island, named Anak Krakatau ("child of Krakatoa" in Indonesian), broke water in August 1930 and produced lava flows more quickly than the waves could erode them. Anak Krakatoa experienced multiple eruptions throughout the next century.

On 22 December 2018, an eruption of Anak Krakatoa collapsed the main volcanic cone and the volcano's southwestern flank, causing a deadly tsunami, with waves up to five meters in height making landfall. On 10 January 2019, eruptive activity resumed, with a phreatomagmatic eruption observed in May 2019 around the newly reconstructed crater. Periodic eruptions continued into September 2023 and in July and September 2026. They disrupted fishing, school, and flight activities in the nearby area.

=== Political ===
On 2 October 1883, five weeks after the eruption, a Dutch soldier was repeatedly stabbed by a bearded, white-robed man while paying for tobacco in the small town of Serang. The assailant was never captured, but a similarly dressed man attacked a sentry at the garrison six weeks later, blaming the Dutch for bringing divine vengeance upon the area. The "extreme religious zeal" noted by the man's interrogators was seen as widespread, and historians suggest it was exploited by rising Muslim conservatives and anticolonial leaders (such as Abdul Karim Amrullah) to foment the Banten Peasant's Revolt in 1888, and to prey upon the Dutch conscience made uneasy by Max Havelaar and subsequent revelations of abuses.

The explosion was the first natural disaster in history whose effects were definitively felt worldwide and whose cause was known, following the development of transoceanic communication cables. Winchester suggests the disaster marks the birth of an era of global awareness.

== Biological research ==
The islands have become a major case study of island biogeography and founder populations in an ecosystem being built from the ground up in an environment virtually cleaned.

The islands had been little studied or biologically surveyed before the 1883 catastrophe—only two pre-1883 biological collections are known: one of plant specimens and the other part of a shell collection. From descriptions and drawings made by HMS Discovery, the flora appears to have been representative of a typical Javan tropical climax forest. The pre-1883 fauna is virtually unknown but was probably typical of the smaller islands in the area.

=== Botanical studies ===
From a biological perspective, the Krakatau problem refers to the question of whether the islands were completely sterilized by the 1883 eruption or whether some indigenous life survived. When the first researchers reached the islands in May 1884, the only living thing they found was a spider in a crevice on the south side of Rakata. Life quickly recolonized the islands, however; Verbeek's visit in October 1884 found grass shoots already growing. The eastern side of the island has been extensively vegetated by trees and shrubs, presumably brought there as seeds washed up by ocean currents or carried in birds' droppings (or brought by natives and scientific investigators). However, the floral ecosystem on Rakata is considerably vulnerable to environmental factors, and has been damaged by recent eruptions at Anak Krakatau.

=== Handl's occupancy ===
In 1914, plans were to set aside Rakata as a nature preserve. In 1916, Johann Handl, a German "pumice collector", obtained a permit to mine pumice, against "strong community objections", apparently to get away from World War I. His lease of 8.7 square kilometres (3.4 sq mi) (basically the eastern half of the island) was to be for 30 years. Handl took up residence on the south coast of Rakata, where he built a house and planted a garden along with "four European families and about 30 coolies". Handl found un-burned wood below the 1883 ash deposits while digging, and fresh water was found below 5.5 metres (18 ft). He and his entourage stayed there for four years, but left due to "violation of the terms of the lease." It is his party that is believed to have inadvertently introduced the black rat to the island, which quickly proliferated.

== Conservation ==
Krakatoa was declared as a nature reserve in 1921, corresponding to IUCN management category Ia (strict nature reserve). Along with several other nature reserves, it was proposed as a national park in 1980. In 1991, "Ujung Kulon National Park and Krakatau Nature Reserve" was inscribed as an UNESCO World Heritage Site, matching Natural criteria (vii) and (x). Ujung Kulon National Park was officially established in 1992, including Krakatoa.

== See also ==
- Krakatoa documentary and historical materials
- List of volcanic eruptions by death toll
- List of volcanoes in Indonesia
