= William Ascroft =

British illustrator

William Ascroft (1832–1914) was a late 19th-century British landscape painter best known for his colour sketches commissioned by the Royal Academy of Arts of sunsets over Chelsea in England in the years after the 1883 explosion of the Krakatoa volcano, recording details otherwise unavailable before the invention of colour photography. Ascroft was known to sketch the sky at sunset regularly, and made a total of more than 500 works detailing the red skies post-eruption. John Rowlands, a Welsh astronomy author and observer, first recognised, in 2010, several of Ascroft's post-sunset works as indisputable depictions of noctilucent cloud, a twilight phenomenon of the mesosphere, which probably reached a tipping point where they became more common following the Krakatoa eruption. Continued industrial emissions then rendered NLC a predictable, repeating summer phenomenon
