= Gouverneur Generaal Loudon (ship) =

Dutch ship that survived Krakatoa eruption

History

Netherlands
- Name: Gouverneur Generaal Loudon
- Owner: Nederlandsch Indische Stoomboot Maatschappij (1875-1891); Koninklijke Paketvaart-Maatschappij (1891-1898)
- Builder: Caird & Company, Greenock, Scotland,
- Yard number: 198
- Launched: 1875
- Fate: Wrecked 1898

General characteristics
- Type: Steam packet
- Tonnage: 1,436 tons

Gouverneur Generaal Loudon was a mail steamer and excursion vessel which survived the 1883 eruption of Krakatoa.

== Ship history ==
The ship was built by Caird & Company of Greenock, Scotland, in 1875 and operated by the Nederlandsch Indische Stoomboot Maatschappij ("Netherlands Indies Steamship Company") until 1891, when the assets and business of the company was taken over by the Koninklijke Paketvaart-Maatschappij ("Royal Packet Navigation Company"). She was named after James Loudon (1824–1900), a Dutch politician and governor of the Dutch East Indies (1872–1875).

In 1883, while captained by Johan Lindemann, the ship was in the Sunda Strait during the eruption of Krakatoa and survived the subsequent tsunami when the captain steered the ship head on into the wave. After the wave passed, pyroclastic airfall was the ship's biggest enemy. A foot of ash could have made the ship capsize, but everyone on board survived due to a combination of the crew keeping the decks clear of ash and Captain Lindeman's decision to move the passengers into the ship's hold to maintain stability which kept them alive long enough to ride out the effects of the eruption.

The ship reached Batavia with all passengers alive. In 1898 the ship was stranded and lost in the Flores Sea off the Tengga Batoe reef south of Selayar Island.

== In popular culture ==
The 1953 American adventure film Fair Wind to Java depicts a fictional sailing ship, the Gerrymander, which rides out a large tsunami generated by the 1883 explosion of Krakatoa. The 1969 American disaster film Krakatoa, East of Java depicts a fictional steamer, the Batavia Queen, surviving an encounter with an enormous tsunami at sea between Krakatoa and Java in 1883. Both scenes apparently were inspired at least in part by the historical experience of the Governor General Loudon.

The 2005 British documentary Krakatoa and the 2006 BBC Television docudrama Krakatoa: The Last Days (aired in the United States on the Discovery Channel with the title Krakatoa: Volcano of Destruction) both depict the experience of the Governor General Loudon and Captain Lindemann in the Sunda Strait during the 1883 eruption.
