= Danan (volcano) =

Former volcanic cone of Krakatoa Island, Indonesia

Danan (uncertain derivation) was one of the three volcanic cones (the others being Perboewatan and Rakata) on the island of Krakatoa, in the Sunda Strait, in Indonesia. It stood 450 metres (1,480 ft), lay in the central area of the island, and may have been a twin volcano. Danan was almost entirely destroyed in the 1883 eruption of Krakatoa; only a rocky islet named Bootsmansrots remains of it.

Not much information can be found about Danan; the interior of Krakatoa was little explored or surveyed. There were several peaks, and Verbeek surmised that it formed a "ring-shaped crater wall". In one of the photographs of Perboewatan erupting in May 1883, Danan's irregular shape can be seen in the background, partially obscured by the ash cloud arising from Perboewatan.

Danan apparently joined Perboewatan in eruption sometime after May 1680, when Perboewatan started erupting. A returning Dutch traveler saw both cones erupting in February 1681. Perboewatan started erupting in May 1883. In June, a black cloud hung over the islands for five days, and when it lifted on 24 June, an ash column could be seen issuing apparently from an area between Perboewatan and Danan. By the time Captain Ferzenaar visited the island on 11 August, Danan was in full eruption and there were about a dozen steam plumes, most of which were between the two cones. The two cones continued erupting, entering the cataclysmic phase on 26 August, with four terminal events on the morning of the 27 August. Rogier Verbeek's reconstruction of the eruption has Danan destroyed at about 10:52 am, 27 August in the last of the catastrophic explosions.

Bootsmansrots ('Bosun's Rock' in Dutch) is a small (about 10 m squared) platform of rock composed of parallel slabs of hypersthene andesite tilted at about a 45-degree angle to the sea surface. It probably was an extrusion dike in the flank of Danan and was stable enough to keep Danan from being destroyed in the major explosion at 10:02 am which destroyed the area to the south and the northern half of Rakata. The steep angle to the west indicates that it has moved from its original location, probably by the bulk of Danan collapsing in that direction.
