= Perboewatan =

Volcanic cone of Krakatau destroyed in 1883

Perboewatan (also spelled Perbuatan or Perbuwatan; apparently a Malay word of uncertain derivation) was one of the three main volcanic cones (the others being Danan and Rakata) on the island of Krakatoa (or Krakatau), in the Sunda Strait, in Indonesia. It was the lowest (121 m) and northernmost of the cones. Perboewatan was completely destroyed during the 1883 eruption; the caldera is approximately 250 metres (820 ft) deep at its former location.

Photographed on May 27, 1883 by visitors to the island, Perboewatan is the only cone on Krakatoa of which quality pre-1883 photographs exist. In the photos, it appears to be a low hill with a flat top. Climbers reported the erupting crater to be about 1,005 m (3,297 ft) across at the top, narrowing to 46 m (151 ft) at the bottom and 150–240 m deep. Samples were collected, revealing upon analysis a silica (SiO_{2}) content of 65%.

In February 1681, two individuals traveling through the Straits witnessed the eruption of Krakatoa. Johann Wilhelm Vogel, a mining assayer, was told that the eruption began in May 1680. Since they were passing to the north of the island, it was apparent that the cone they witnessed was Perboewatan. This is backed up by Verbeek's visit in 1880, during which he took samples from a "fresh-looking" lava flow on the northern coast. The flow was unweathered, with little vegetation, indicating recent origin.

Perboewatan began erupting on 20 May 1883, having previously been thought extinct. On 27 May 1883, the General Governor Loudon took a sight-seeing group of about 90 to Krakatoa, landing on the northern end of the island, just below Perboewatan. Several in the party climbed up to the crater, which was still erupting. As the ship was leaving, a photographer took several photos of the erupting volcano. In Rogier Verbeek's reconstruction of the eruption, Perboewatan is thought to have been the first cone destroyed, at about 4:40 am on 27 August.
