= Moments in Time =

Studio album by Alex & Nilusha
- Released: March 9, 2012
- Recorded: Melbourne, Australia
- Genres: Jazz, world music
- Length: 61:01
- Label: Whispering Tree Music
- Producer: Alex Pertout

Professional ratings
Review scores
Source	Rating
The Australian	4.5/5 stars
The Sydney Morning Herald	4/5 stars
DRUMscene	5/5 stars
The Age	4/5 stars

Moments in Time is the debut album by Alex & Nilusha. The album includes pianists Joe Chindamo and Tony Gould, flautist Dave Valentin, trumpeter Miroslav Bukovsky, guitarist Leonard Grygorian, bassist Craig Newman, drummer David Jones, and sarodist Saby Bhattacharya.

== Track listing ==
No.	Title	Length
1.	"Moments in Time" (Alex Pertout/Nilusha Dassenaike)	6:44
2.	"Waters of March"	5:56
3.	"Afro Blue"	5:07
4.	"The Wind"	4:41
5.	"You Can Close Your Eyes"	3:05
6.	"Between You and I"	5:30
7.	"Baba Soroso"	1:44
8.	"Walk with Me/Elegua Ago"	4:13
9.	"Manaus"	6:48
10.	"Morning"	5:29
11.	"Free"	5:34
12.	"From the Heart"	6:10
