= Krakatoa: The Last Days =

2006 British TV docudrama film directed by Sam Miller

- Cover art of BBC DVD.
- Genre: Docudrama; History; Disaster
- Written by: Colin Heber-Percy; Michael Olmert; Lyall B. Watson
- Directed by: Sam Miller
- Starring: Rupert Penry-Jones; Olivia Williams; Kevin McMonagle
- Country of origin: United Kingdom
- Original language: English

Production
- Producers: Alan Eyres; J. Gregory Smith
- Cinematography: Giulio Biccari
- Running time: 90 minutes
- Budget: £2,200,000

Original release
- Network: BBC One
- Release: 7 May 2006

Krakatoa: The Last Days (also titled Krakatoa: Volcano of Destruction in the U.S. on the Discovery Channel) is a BBC Television docudrama that premiered on 7 May 2006 on BBC One. The program is based upon four eyewitness accounts of the 1883 eruption of Krakatoa, an active stratovolcano between the islands of Sumatra and Java, in the Dutch East Indies (now present day Indonesia).

== Production ==
The series was produced by the BBC in co-production with Discovery Channel, RTL Television, and France 2.

== Ratings ==
The film was broadcast on BBC One on 7 May 2006 and drew 6.4 million viewers (27% audience share)

== Synopsis ==
The 1883 eruption of Krakatoa is the second greatest volcanic eruption in recorded history (after the 1815 eruption of Mount Tambora, only 68 years earlier), erupting more than 18 cubic kilometres of tephra in less than 48 hours, and killing about 36,500 people. The film refers to an account in the Pustaka Raja of a previous violent eruption in that area.

A subplot concerning Rogier Verbeek (played by Kevin McMonagle), a Dutch geologist who had surveyed the area two years earlier and laid the basis for modern vulcanology with his research after the eruption, adds a scientific touch and a helpful map to the computer-generated imagery that convincingly portrays the ash cloud, collapse of the stratovolcano, pyroclastic flows, and tsunamis. The eruption column collapsing sends a big pyroclastic flow over the Sunda Strait coast of Sumatra.The film also portrays a family trying to escape the devastating volcano, and a ship with more than 100 passengers trapped at sea when the final collapse of Krakatoa island at the end of the eruption generates a massive tsunami.

== Cast ==
- Rupert Penry-Jones as Willem Beijerinck
- Olivia Williams as Johanna Beijerinck
- Kevin McMonagle as Rogier Verbeek
- Ramon Tikaram as Tokaya
- William Miller as Pieter Beijerinck
- Janine Wood as Catharina Schuit
- Bill Flynn as Jacob Gerrit Schuit
- Darrell D'Silva as Captain Johannes F. Lindeman

== Historical inaccuracy ==
Just after Captain Lindeman leaves the cargo bay and heads to the ship's deck, one of the girls begins to sing a song to calm down the nervous passengers. The song is "Płonie ognisko w lesie" ("Burning fireplace in the forest"), a popular Polish scout song. It was written in 1922, 39 years after the Krakatoa eruption.
