= Elias Hesse =

German traveller (1658–?)

Elias Hesse (November 12, 1658 – ?) was a German man who travelled through Southeast Asia in the 17th century, and the author of an account on the topic, Ost-Indische Reise-Beschreibung.

Hesse was the son of a miller, born in Saxony. In 1680, he was recruited by the Dutch East India Company as a clerk in Benjamin Olitzsch's ill-fated gold mining expedition, where they were sent, along with 20 miners, to investigate the reserves at Sillida (south of Padang) in Sumatra. The operation suffered heavily from a variety of misfortunes. The operating costs were too high, and the company had to employ the assistance of a large number of slaves for labour; although they did not need to pay them, feeding and providing for them proved costly. They also had to pay military posts for protection. This, coupled with a shortage of supplies and various tropical diseases which the Europeans were not prepared for, made the operation slow going. The gold reserves themselves were not worth the effort; no rich veins were found. Mining stopped in 1694, although Hesse left in 1683.

On his return, Hesse wrote his account of the trip, and it was published in 1687 in Dresden. Three years later, a revised and improved edition was released in Leipzig. This was then reprinted in 1735.

The current issue of the travel description is titled Gold Mines in Sumatra 1680-1683 (Haag, Martinus Nijhoff, 1931) and is based on the second edition of 1690.
