= Wouter Schouten =

Dutch VOC ship Medical Doctor/Surgeon

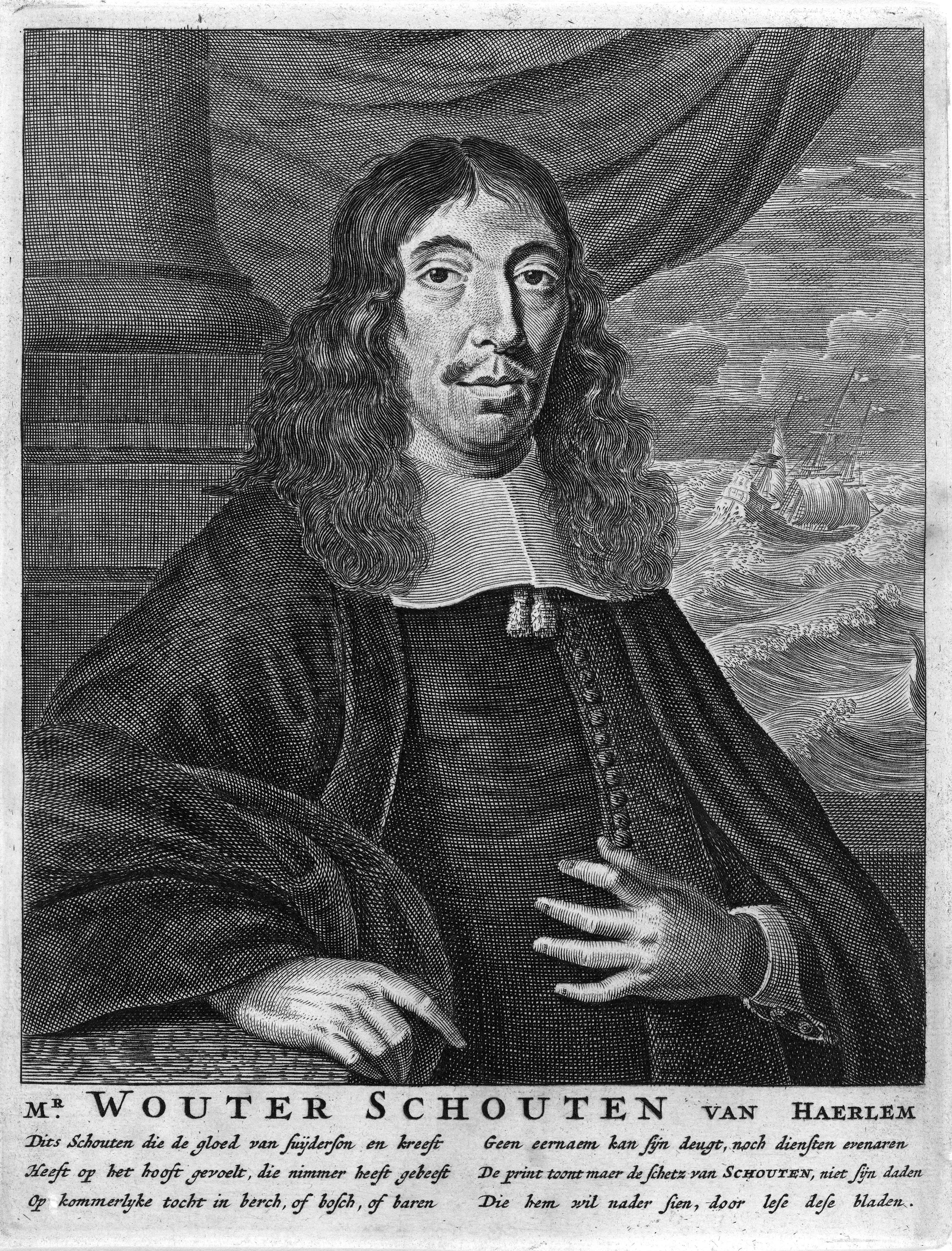
- Born: 2 September 1638; Haarlem, Netherlands
- Died: 6 October 1704 (aged 66)
- Occupations: Surgeon, Author
- Known for: East Indian Voyage (1676)
- Notable work: East Indian Voyage (1676), The Wounded Head (1694), Treatise on Unnatural Tumors (1727)
- Spouse(s): Adriana van Masschel (m. 1666) Maria Wendel (m. 1680)

Wouter Schouten (Haarlem, 2 September 1638 – October 1704) was a Dutch surgeon who published a book named "East India Company Voyage" in 1676 about his service experiences as a ship surgeon in VOC Dutch East India Company. The book was very successful and translated into many languages. He was also well-known for his surgical skills, experiences and medical knowledge.

== Biography ==
At the age of fourteen, Schouten became an apprentice to a surgeon. Driven by a desire to gain experience and travel, he took an exam with the Dutch East India Company on March 6, 1658, and was accepted as second surgeon. On April 16 of that same year, he left Texel on the flute ship Nieuwpoort.

Surgeons at that time had not only to treated the sick and wounded, they also functioned as barbers on board. Surgeons were not allowed to ask for payment for treating illnesses and injuries that occurred on board. Injuries from fights and venereal diseases had to be paid for separately. He had cut off patients' fingers and toes with a chisel and hammer while on board of his voyage.

After a voyage of six months, the ship arrived at the Batavia roadstead and Schouten settled in Batavia Castle . Later, Schouten, appointed chief surgeon in July 1659, travelled to Japara and the Moluccas and was later positioned to stay on Ambon. There he joined the hongitocht of governor Jacob Hustaert, in which illegal planters on Seram were punished by destroying their houses, boats and plantations for supplying spices to competitors, such as the Portuguese, English, Chinese or traders from Makassar . In his book, Schouten extensively described the cunning and successful VOC attack on Makassar Castle; after that the sultan promised to expel the 2,000 Portuguese traders. After some time he was allowed to sail again on the ship Hasselt . At the end of his three-year contract, Schouten ended up in Arakan, where the Company traded in rice and slaves.

== Works ==
In 1676, Schouten published three travelogues where he used his own experiences and impressions together with existing literature, including books by Johan van Twist, Adam Olearius, and François Bernier. The East Indian Voyage is considered, even by François Valentijn, a contemporary, to be one of the best travel stories written at the time.
