= Ian Thornton =

Australian zoologist (1926–2002)

Ian Walter Boothroyd Thornton (1926–2002) was an Australian zoologist. He was an elected fellow of the Australian Academy of Science and served as vice-president of the Australian Entomological Society. He is the author of Krakatau and Island Colonization.
