= Verlaten Island =

Island in the Sunda Strait in Indonesia

Coordinates: 6°5′29.288″S 105°22′54.329″E

Verlaten Island (Dutch: "Abandoned", "Deserted" or "Forsaken"; modern Indonesian: Sertung) is a volcanic island. The island is located in the Sunda Strait in Indonesia, between Java and Sumatra. It is part of the Krakatoa Archipelago, above the famous Krakatoa volcano. Other than some minor collapse in the southeast (closest to the main island of Krakatoa), Verlaten suffered little damage in the 1883 eruption. Instead, it grew almost three times in area due to pumice fall, although most of the gain was quickly eroded away.

A map of the Krakatoa archipelago; Verlaten is at the upper left

== Form ==
Verlaten is a rather low island with a hill in the middle. After the 1883 eruption, Verlaten developed a low spit of land to the northeast with a brackish lake near the end. This lake became a waterfowl haven but has since been breached by wave erosion.
