= Lang Island =

Island in Indonesia

Coordinates: 6°5′32″S 105°27′27″E

Lang Island (Dutch: "Long"; modern Indonesian: Krakatau Kecil or Panjang) lies in the Sunda Strait, between Java and Sumatra, in Indonesia. It is one of the Krakatoa Archipelago, above the famous Krakatoa volcano. Lang suffered only slightly in the 1883 eruption of Krakatoa; it actually grew in area from massive pumice fall, although most of the additional area washed away within several years.

The island is quite hilly, standing at around 1.4 kilometres (0.87 mi) at its widest extent.
