= Rogier Verbeek =

Dutch vulcanologist (1845–1926)

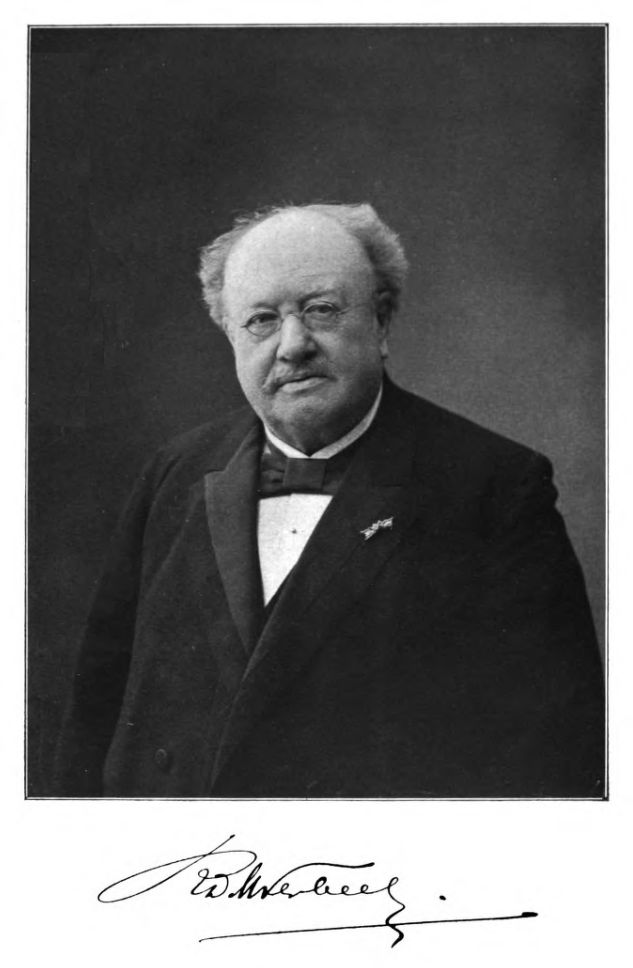
R.D.M. Verbeek

Rogier Diederik Marius Verbeek (7 April 1845, Doorn – 9 April 1926, The Hague) was a Dutch geologist and natural scientist.

His journal Krakatau, which was edited in 1884 and 1885 by order of the Governor-General of the Dutch East Indies, is his most known work. It deals with the eruption of the volcanic island Krakatoa in 1883 and brought volcanology into scientific prominence. Just two years before, Verbeek had done research in the area. Living in Buitenzorg on Java, he was a direct witness to the eruption. In the BBC docudrama Krakatoa: The Last Days, he is the protagonist and was portrayed by Kevin McMonagle.

In 1909, he obtained an honorary doctorate of Delft University of Technology. He was an honorary member of the Koninklijk Nederlands Geologisch Mijnbouwkundig Genootschap and a member of the Maatschappij der Nederlandsche Letterkunde.

== Works ==
The following are some of Verbeek's other writings:

- Topographische en geologische Beschrijving van een Deel van Sumatra's Westkust, Batavia, 1883.
- Geologische beschrijving van Java en Madoera, Amsterdam, 1896. Written together with R. Fennema, by order of the Governor-General of the Dutch East Indies.
- De eilanden Alor en Pantar, residentie Timor en onderhoorigheden, Amsterdam, 1914, on behalf of the Koninklijk Nederlands Aardrijkskundig Genootschap.
- De vulkanische erupties in Oost-Java in het laatst der 16de eeuw, Verhandelingen van het Genootschap, 1925.
- Kort verslag over de aardbeving te Ambon op 6 Jan. 1898, Perpustakaan Nasional RI, lantai 14 Layanan Buku Langka
