= Periya =

Periya may refer to:

- Periya, Kasaragod, Kerala, India
- Periya, Wayanad, Kerala, also called Boys Town
- Periya Puranam, a Tamil poetical work about the Shaiva saints of south India
