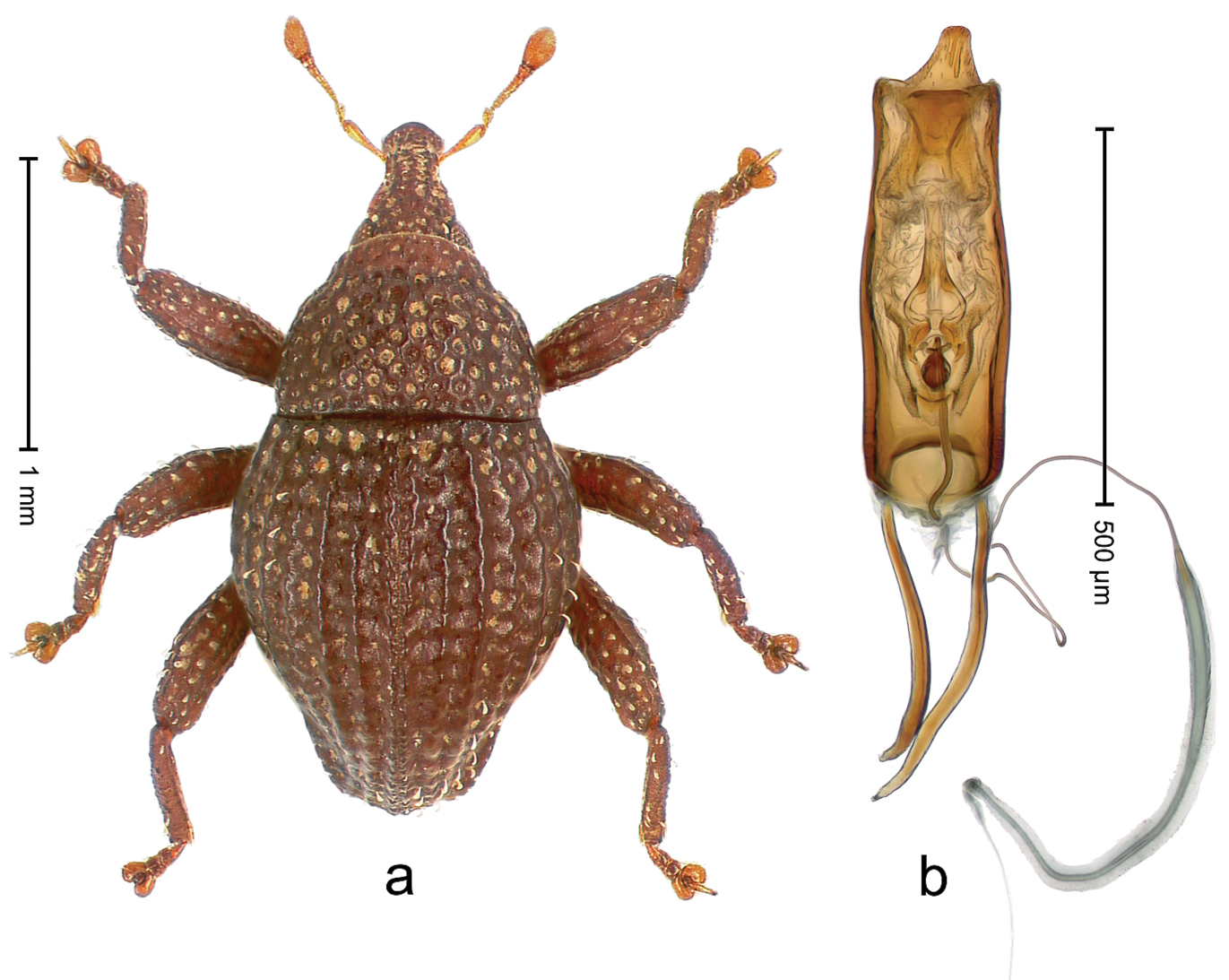

Scientific classification
- Kingdom: Animalia
- Phylum: Arthropoda
- Clade: Pancrustacea
- Class: Insecta
- Order: Coleoptera
- Suborder: Polyphaga
- Infraorder: Cucujiformia
- Family: Curculionidae
- Genus: Trigonopterus
- Species: T. honjensis

Binomial name
- Trigonopterus honjensis Riedel, 2014

= Trigonopterus honjensis =

Species of beetle

Trigonopterus honjensis is a species of flightless weevil in the genus Trigonopterus from Indonesia.

== Etymology ==
The specific name is derived from that of the type locality.

== Description ==
Individuals measure 1.99–2.22 mm in length. The body is slightly oval in shape. General coloration is rust-colored.

== Range ==
The species is found around elevations of 395–540 metres (1,296–1,772 ft) on Mount Honje in the Ujung Kulon National Park in the Indonesian province of Banten.
