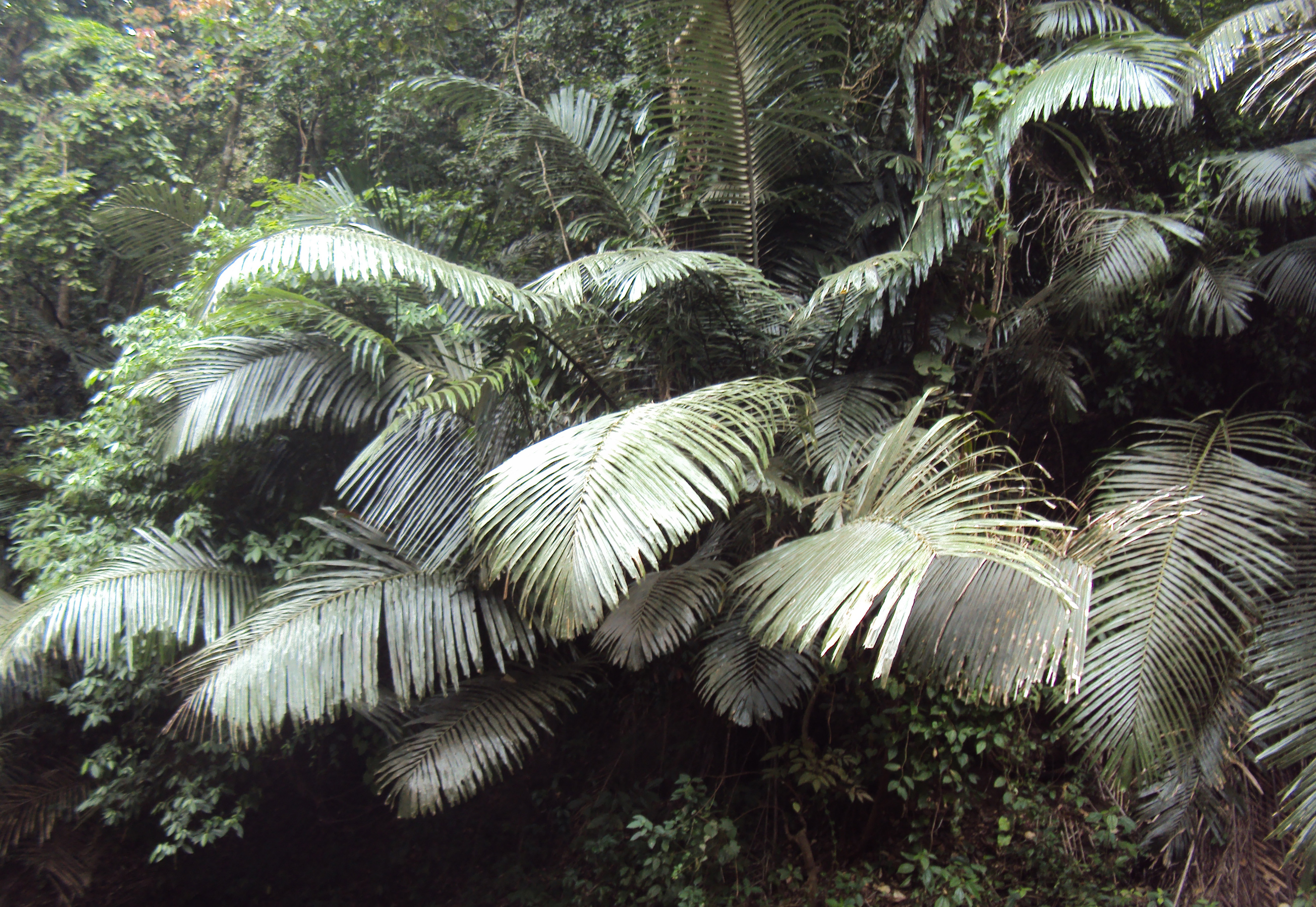
- Arenga wightii at Periya, Wayanad

Conservation status
- Vulnerable (IUCN 2.3)

Scientific classification
- Kingdom: Plantae
- Clade: Embryophytes
- Clade: Tracheophytes
- Clade: Angiosperms
- Clade: Monocots
- Clade: Commelinids
- Order: Arecales
- Family: Arecaceae
- Genus: Arenga
- Species: A. wightii

Binomial name
- Arenga wightii Griff.

Synonyms
- Saguerus wightii (Griff.) H.Wendl. & Drude

= Arenga wightii =

Species of palm

Arenga wightii is a species of flowering plant in the family Arecaceae. It is native to the Southern Western Ghats in Kerala in India. This palm has various uses in its communities. Local tribal communities depend on this plant for starch (food supplement) and religious ceremonies. It is also used to cover the roofs of houses due to its string resemblance to coconut leaves. Scientists have discovered that this palm has medicinal value. It is said to have antimicrobial and antioxidant phytochemicals. It is threatened by habitat loss and logging.

== Description ==
This is a pinnately compound leaved palm, with four-to-eight-metre-long (13 to 26 ft) leaves. The number of leaflets usually exceeds 50 pairs. The leaf surface is glaucous on the underside, with an apex that is unequally bilobed. The leaf base is asymmetrical, with one of the lobes often extending over the rachis. The tree produces cream-colored unisexual flowers, where male and female flowers will be on different inflorescences. Fruits are green and globose.

== Ecology ==
This is a plant frequently seen in the steep slopes of Western Ghats, from Uttara Kannada to Kanyakumari. The elevation ranges from 400 to 800 metres (1,300 to 2,600 ft). This is a shade-loving palm usually seen as colonies that grows up to a height of 10 m and diameter up to 30 cm.

== Uses ==
Local tribal communities, such as the Mudhuvans in Idukki, rely on this palm primarily for the starch obtained from its pith and for toddy, which is collected by tapping its inflorescence. The inflorescence of the palm is used in religious ceremonies, while its leaves, resembling those of the coconut palm, are used for thatching huts and pandals within the settlement. Although the fruit contains needle-like oxalate crystals that cause irritation, it is dehusked and repeatedly boiled to make it suitable for consumption. The dried kernels are ground into a powder and mixed with rice flour to prepare various foods. The palm's terminal bud, also known as the "cabbage," is edible, though it is rarely used by the community today.

Starch is harvested from the stem of the palm when it reaches an age of 15–20 years. This process involves felling the tree and removing its sclerenchymatous hypodermis. The cylindrical cortex is then chopped, and the starch is extracted by mixing it with water, followed by drying. The dried starch serves as a food supplement and is also used in the preparation of traditional dishes like kurukk and upuma.

== Threats ==
The destructive utilization of these palms along its distributional range is a threat to this vulnerable palm species. Habitat loss associated with agricultural development and settlement is another major threat.
