= Vatica bantamensis =

Conservation status
- Critically Endangered (IUCN 3.1)

Scientific classification
- Kingdom: Plantae
- Clade: Tracheophytes
- Clade: Angiosperms
- Clade: Eudicots
- Clade: Rosids
- Order: Malvales
- Family: Dipterocarpaceae
- Genus: Vatica
- Species: V. bantamensis

Binomial name
- Vatica bantamensis (Hassk.) Benth. & Hook.f. ex Miq.

Synonyms
- Anisoptera bantamensis Hassk.; Sunaptea bantamensis Kurz

Species of tree native to Indonesia

Vatica bantamensis is a species of flowering plant in the family Dipterocarpaceae. It is a tree endemic to western Java in Indonesia. It is a medium-sized tree which can grow up to 30 meters tall. It is known from a single location in Ujung Kulon National Park, where it grows in dense lowland rain forest on ridges and slopes with acidic soil. There is a single subpopulation of 250 individuals and 58 mature individuals. The species is threatened with habitat loss from the introduced invasive Langkap palm (Arenga obtusifolia). The IUCN Red List assesses the species as Critically Endangered.
