= Ujung Kulon National Park =

National park in Java, Indonesia

- Taman Nasional Ujung Kulon
- IUCN category II (national park)
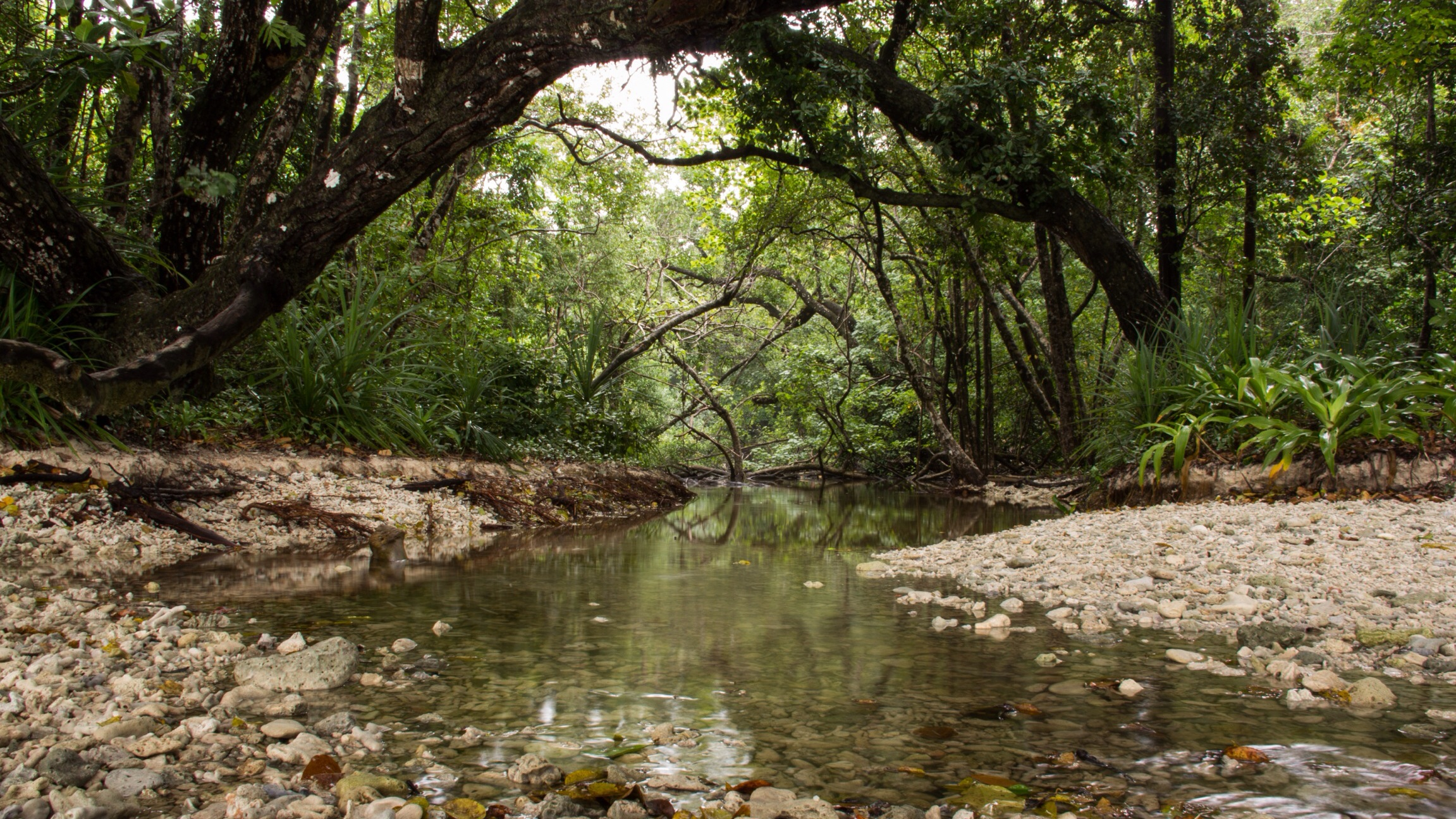

- Location within Java
- Location: Banten, Java, Indonesia
- Nearest city: Cilegon
- Coordinates: 6°44′48″S 105°20′1″E
- Area: 122,956 acres (497.59 km^{2})
- Established: 26 February 1992
- Visitors: 2,385; about 12,000 in 2014. (in 2007)
- Governing body: Ministry of Environment and Forestry
- World Heritage site: 1991
- Website: tnujungkulon.menlhk.go.id

UNESCO World Heritage Site
- Criteria: Natural: vii, x
- Reference: 608
- Inscription: 1991 (15th Session)

Ujung Kulon National Park (Indonesian: Taman Nasional Ujung Kulon) is a national park at the westernmost tip of Java, located in Sumur District of Pandeglang Regency, part of Banten province in Indonesia. It once included the volcanic island group of Krakatoa in Lampung province, although current maps have suggested the Krakatoa island group as its own protected area, the Pulau Anak Krakatau Marine Nature Reserve.

The area has been declared a UNESCO World Heritage Site for "containing the largest remaining area of lowland rainforests in Java", and also for possessing the most threatened species of rhino, the Javan rhino. It was designated before its formation as a national park.

The park fully encompasses the Ujung Kulon peninsula, along with surrounding islands and the Gunung Honje mountain range.

Ujung Kulon itself means Western End or Point West in Banten Sundanese.

== Geography ==
Ujung Kulon National Park covers an area of 1,056.95 km^{2} (408.09 sq mi), of which 443.37 km^{2} (171.19 sq mi) is marine. Most of the park landmass lies on the mainland, specifically the Ujung Kulon Peninsula, with the highest elevation of 480 m (1,570 ft) at Mt. Payung in the southwest of the peninsula. The eastern area of the park is marked by the Honje mountain range, with several low-lying mountains and the highest peak at Mt. Honje at 620 m (2,030 ft).

== History ==
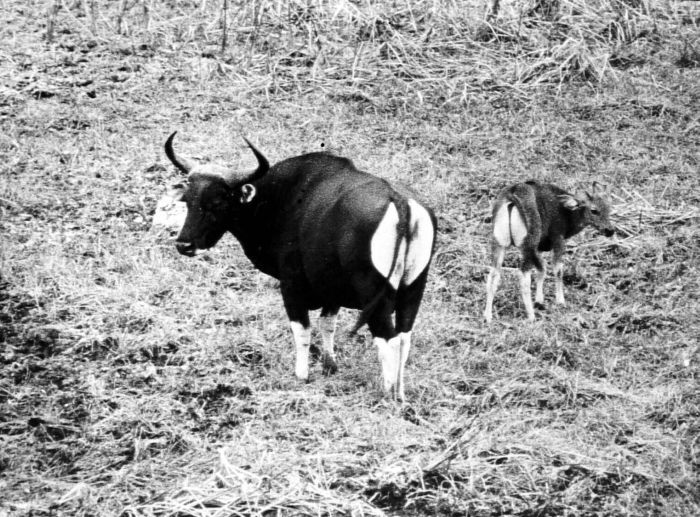
Bantengs in the National Park (1941)

The Ujung Kulon area was first introduced to the Western world by Dutch-German botanist, Franz W. Junghuhn in 1846, during one of his expeditions. Since then, scientists have started gaining interest in the peninsula's biological abundance. Several years later, this supposed first trip to Ujung Kulon was included in a scientific journal. However there are not many written records regarding Ujung Kulon before the eruption of Mount Krakatoa in 1883.

Following the Krakatoa eruption and the ensuing tsunami, which was reported to be 15 meters high, many of the peninsula's settlements were destroyed and never completely rebuilt. The eruption also obliterated much of the local flora and fauna, leaving an average 30 cm (12 in) layer of volcanic ash across the area. Despite this, the area rapidly recovered, enabling it to serve as a repository for a large portion of Java's flora and fauna as well as the majority of the island's lowland forest.

Conservation efforts for the area began in the early 20th century during colonial Dutch East Indies. Pulau Panaitan was first designated as a nature reserve (Suaka Alam) in 1921 before later being combined with Pulau Peucang to become a wildlife sanctuary (Suaka Margasatwa) in 1937. Post-independence, the area acclaimed restored status as a nature reserve along with the peninsula. The southern part of Gunung Honje Protection Forest was incorporated within the reserve in 1967, with the northern portion following in 1979. Lastly, it was declared a national park in 1992. Border reconstructions by Mt. Honje were finalized in 2004.

It is Indonesia's first proposed national park coincidentally designated as a UNESCO World Heritage Site in 1991 during its establishment for containing the largest remaining lowland rainforest in Java. By 2005, the park was designated as an ASEAN Heritage Park.

Villages that still survived within the area have now acclaimed cultural status as Kampung Wisata (literally 'Recreational Village'). Future plans even intended to develop Cimenteng, one of the local hamlets, into an ecovillage. In addition, Ujungjaya, which is the westernmost village, is used as a companion tourist destination for this national park.

== Wildlife ==
Ujung Kulon is one of three national parks in Java housing a lowland rainforest ecosystem, together with Baluran and Alas Purwo National Park. It therefore possesses a somewhat similar ecosystem, despite being much wetter than the latter due to the Köppen-Geiger climate classification, the latter being found on East Java instead.

=== Flora ===
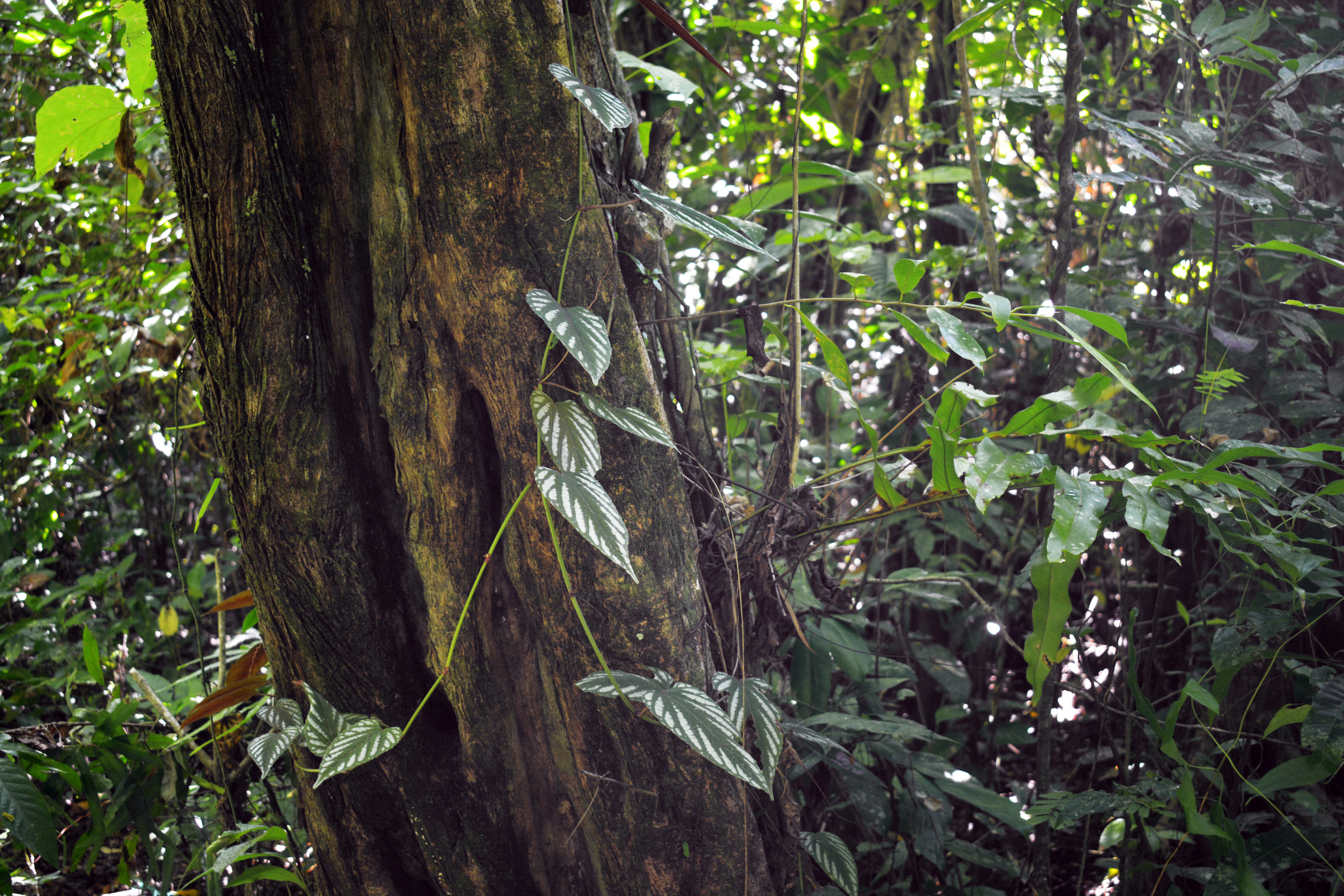
Cissus discolor

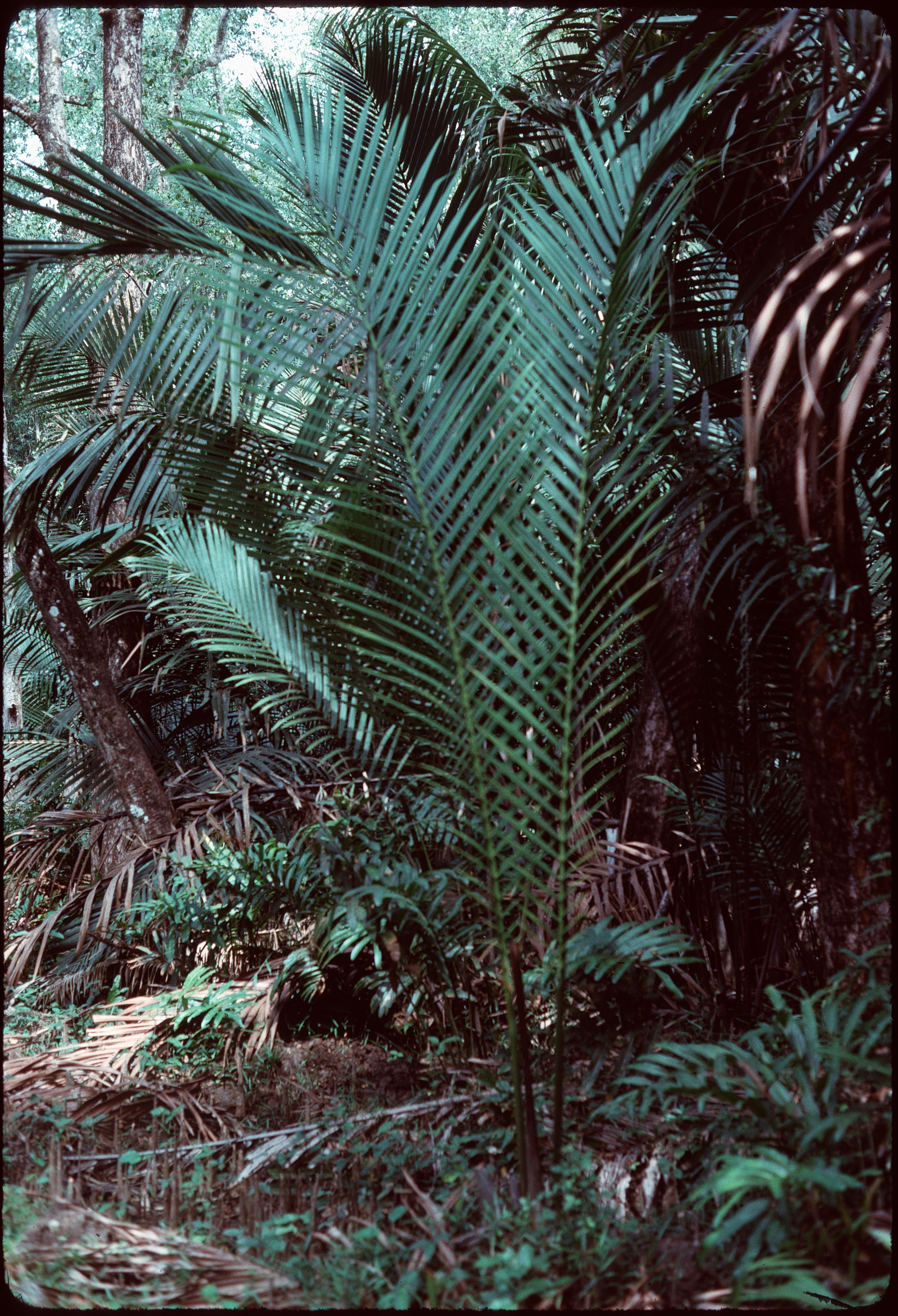
Arenga obtusifolia

So far, 175 species have been observed within the park, with 57 of them being protected, This includes mangroves (e.g. Sonneratia alba, Excoecaria agallocha, Rhizophora apiculata, Aegiceras corniculatum), coastal plants (e.g. Nypa fruticans, Calophyllum inophyllum, Terminalia catappa, Hibiscus tiliaceus, etc.), Figs (e.g. Ficus benjamina, Ficus deltoidea, Ficus racemosa, Ficus septica) and other lowland vegetation such as Oroxylum indicum, Melastoma malabathricum, Sterculia foetida, and Durio zibethinus. The park possesses three protected rare flora, namely Heritiera percoriacea, Vatica bantamensis, and Intsia bijuga. Rafflesia patma is also a notable species.

Currently one particular species of plant is considered troublesome, especially towards the rhino conservation program, the Arenga palm (Arenga obtusifolia). This species of palm has been noted to grow rapidly while consuming much area, starving the undergrowth of sunlight, reducing the rhino's required food supply. Local authorities have claimed that eradication efforts have been and will continue to go on.

=== Fauna ===
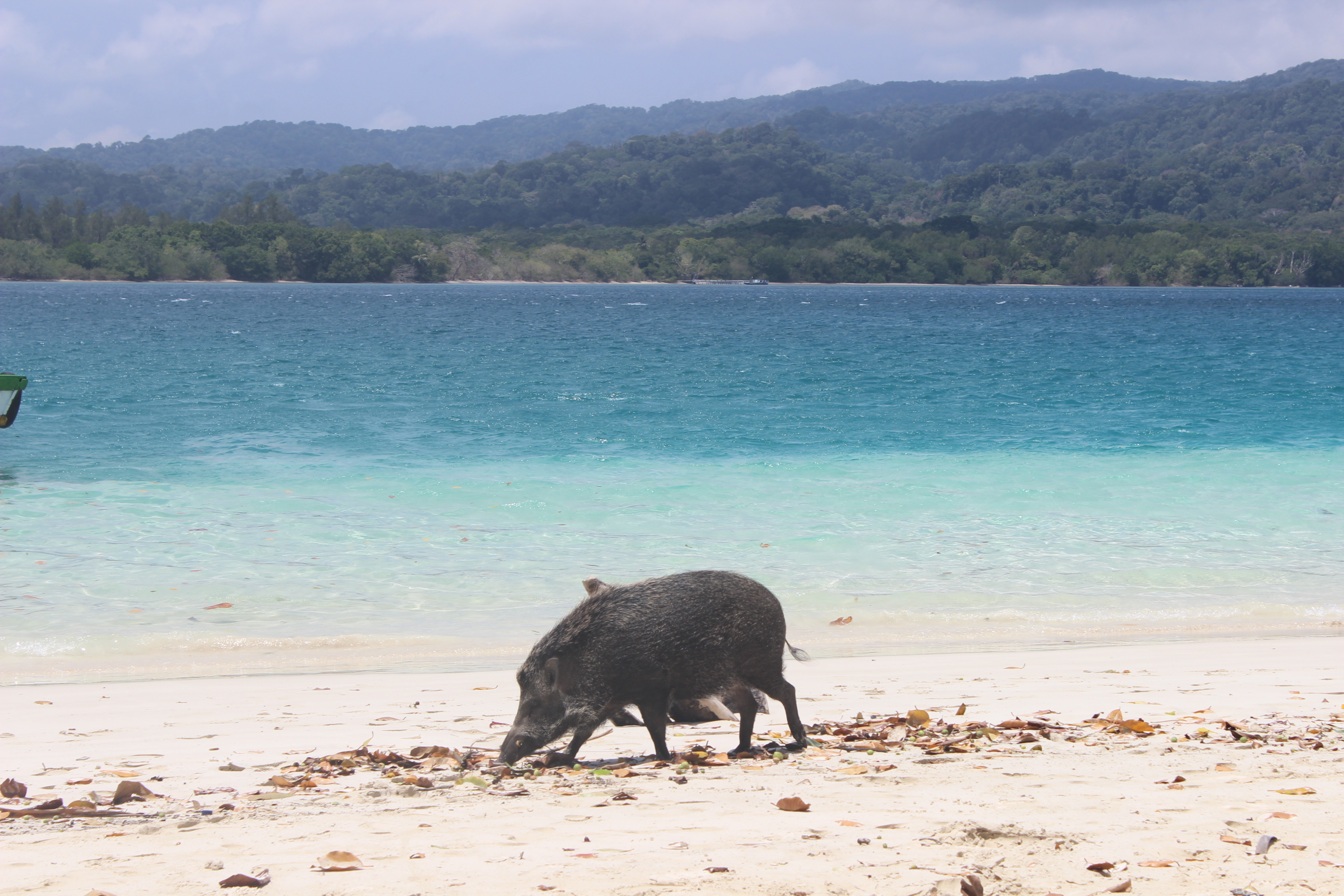
A banded pig in Peucang island

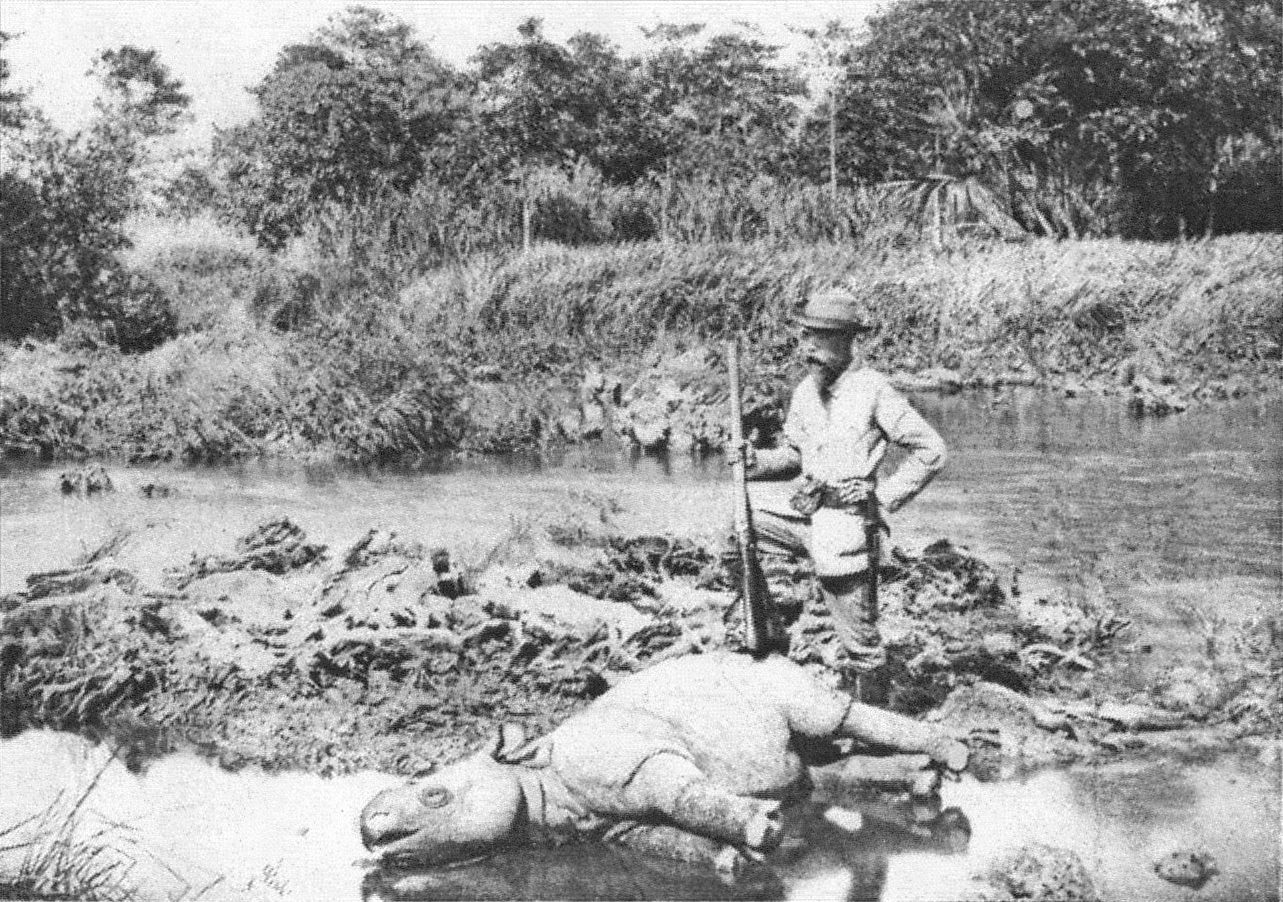
Javan rhino in 1895

Ujung Kulon National Park is the last known refuge for the critically endangered Javan rhinoceros after the death of the last remaining individual in Cát Tiên National Park, Vietnam, where a small population of 10 or less remained in 2010. In Ujung Kulon the population has been estimated at 40–60 in the 1980s. Within 2001-2010 there have been 14 rhino births identified using camera and video traps. Based on recordings taken between February and October 2011, 35 rhinoceros had been identified, of which 22 were males and 13 females. Of these 7 were old, 18 adults, 5 youngsters, and 5 infant rhinos. Increasing from previous years, in 2013 there were 8 calves of which 3 of them were female and 50 teenage and adult of which 20 of them were female identified using 120 video cameras functioning at night with motion sensors. It can be said to be accurate data, since every rhino has its own unique morphology, mainly from skin wrinkles around the eyes. Current estimates are set to about 82 rhinos.

By 2013 feeding areas of Eupatorium odoratum vegetation have been reduced from 10 locations comprising 158 ha (390 acres) to five locations comprising 20 ha (49 acres). This has increased competition for feeding grounds between the local rhino and banteng population.

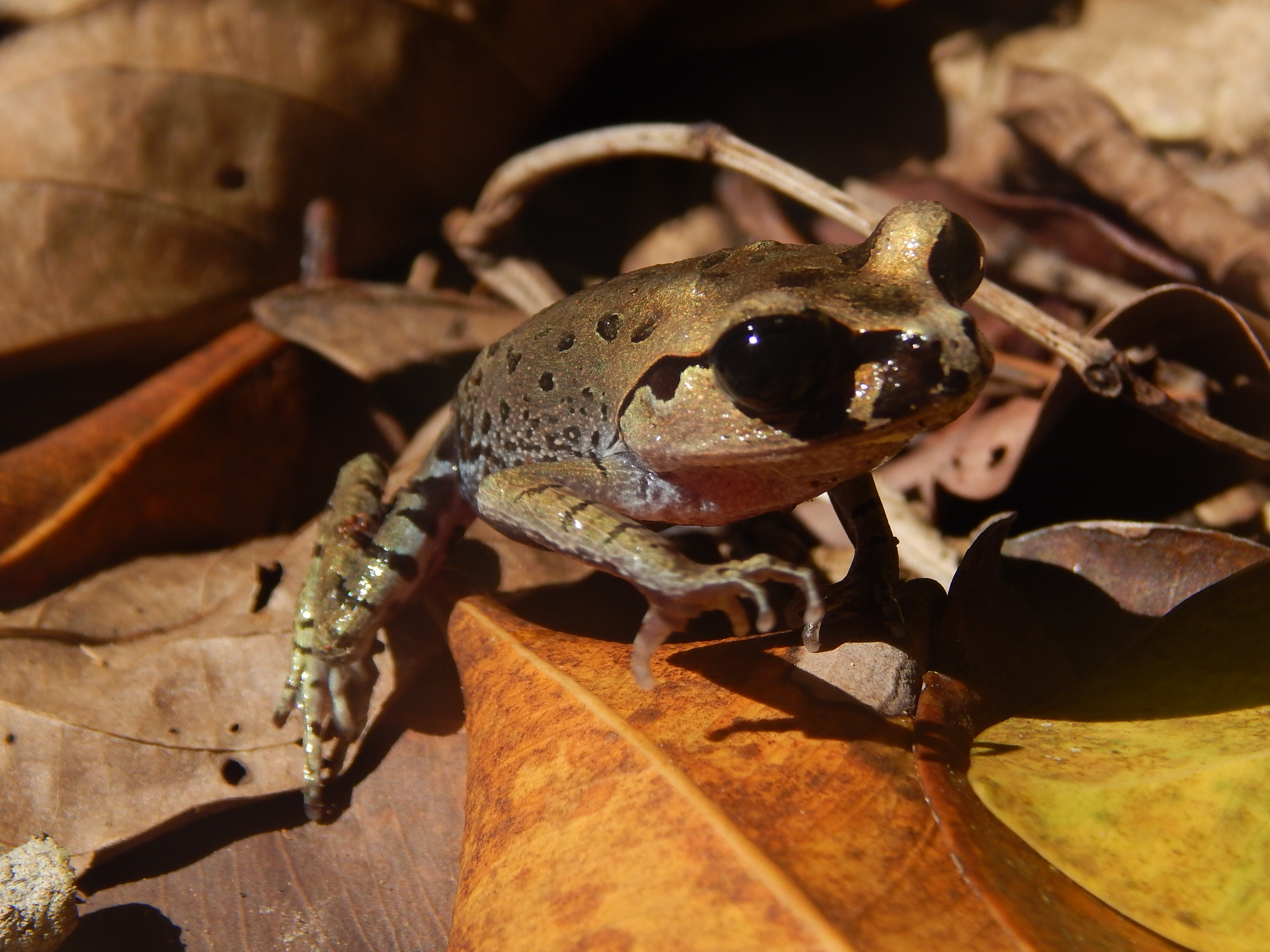
Java spadefoot toad in Cibunar

Roughly 35 mammals species endemic to Java occur in the park, notably the banteng, silvery gibbon, Javan lutung, crab-eating macaque, Javan leopard, dhole, Java mouse-deer, Javan rusa, Sunda leopard cat and smooth-coated otter. There are 197 species of birds.

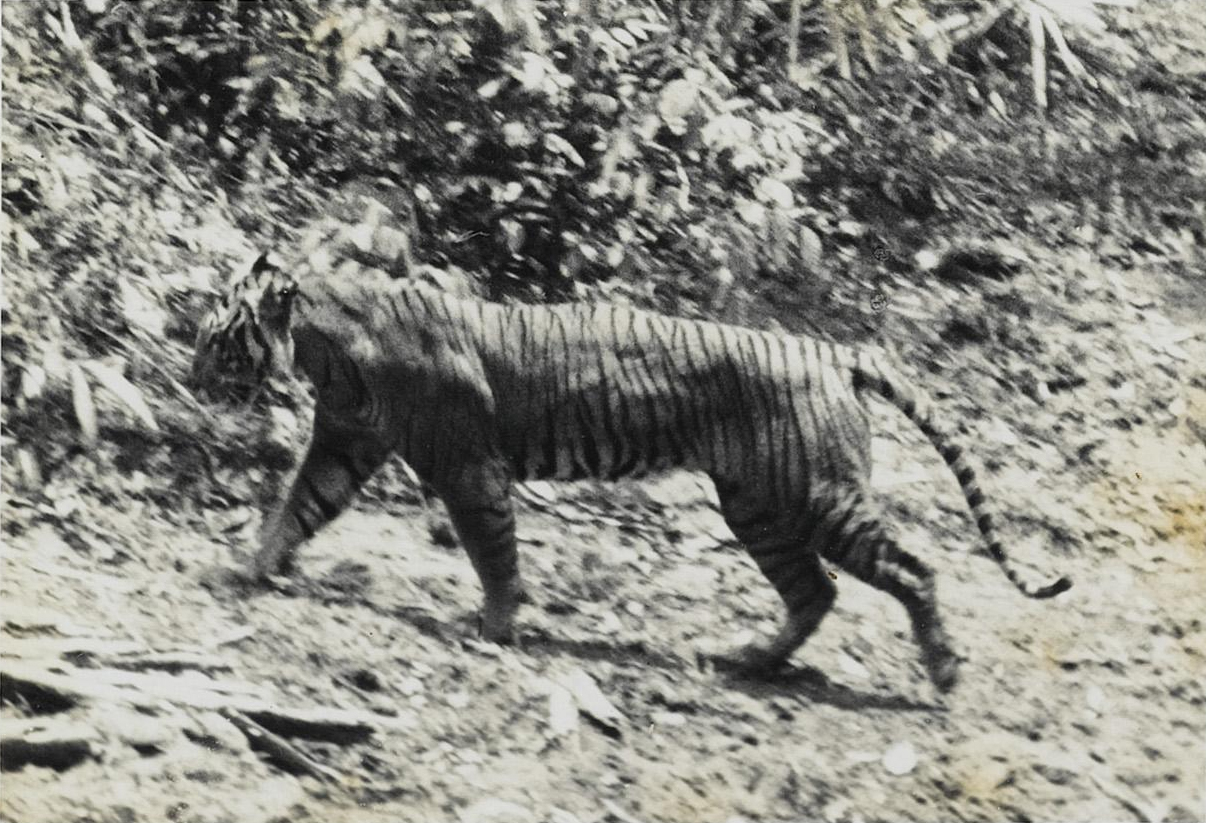
A Javan tiger photographed by Andries Hoogerwerf in 1938

Javan tigers survived in the national park until the mid-1960s.
