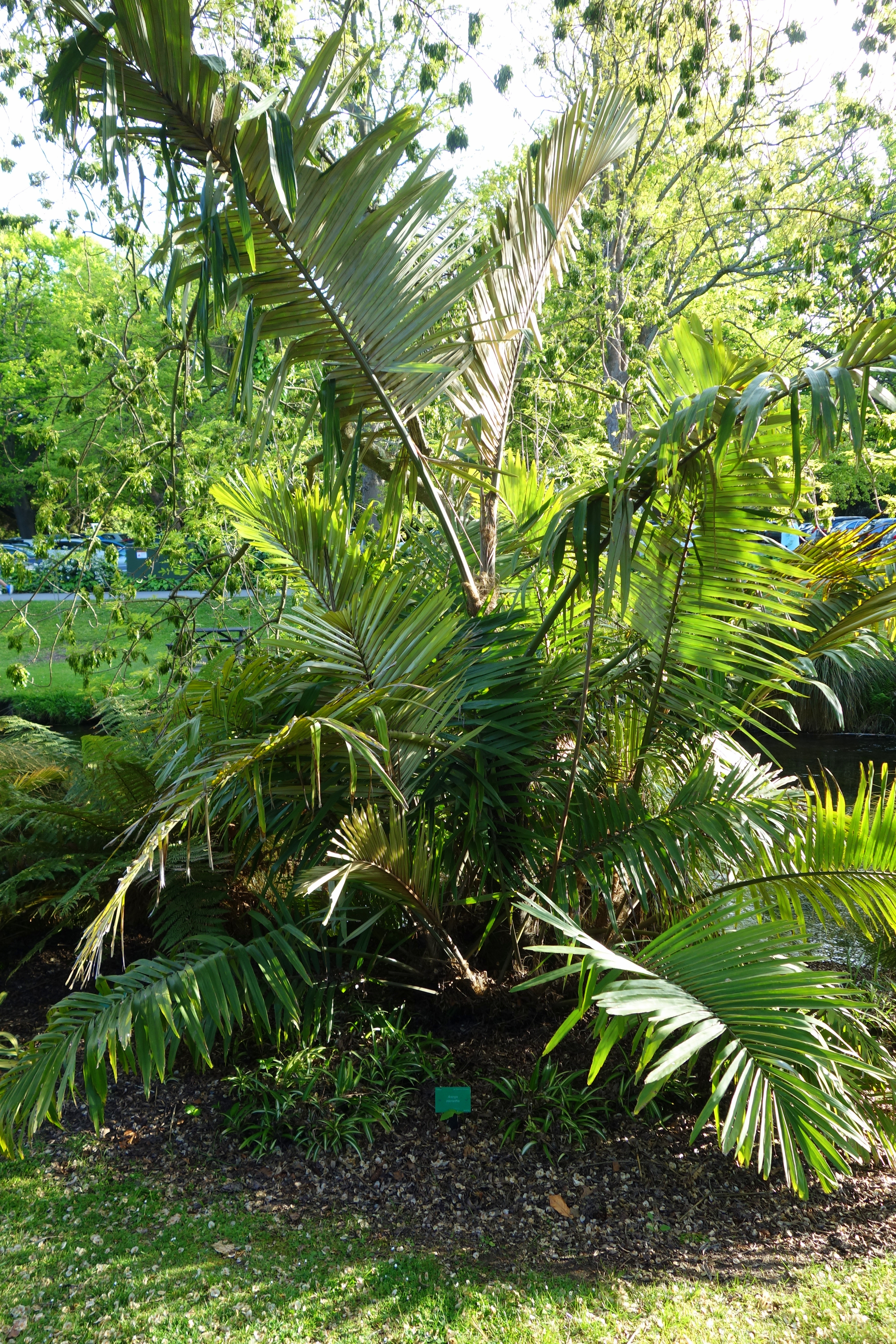

Conservation status
- Endangered (IUCN 3.1)

Scientific classification
- Kingdom: Plantae
- Clade: Tracheophytes
- Clade: Angiosperms
- Clade: Monocots
- Clade: Commelinids
- Order: Arecales
- Family: Arecaceae
- Genus: Arenga
- Species: A. micrantha

Binomial name
- Arenga micrantha C.F. Wei (Chinese: 卫兆芬)

= Arenga micrantha =

Species of plant

Arenga micrantha, also known as the Tibetan sugar palm, is a species of flowering plant in the family Arecaceae, found in the cloud forests of southeastern Tibet, Bhutan, and Arunachal Pradesh in northeastern India. Its natural habitat is subtropical or tropical moist lowland forests, between 1400 and 2150 m. It is threatened by habitat loss.

== Description ==
Arenga micrantha is a distinctive, clustering palm that can exceed 6 m (about 20 ft) in height. It produces multiple stems and bears large, flat, evenly arranged pinnate leaves with strikingly pale to white undersides.

The species occurs at unusually high elevations for a palm, typically between about 2,000 and 2,150 m (6,500–7,000 ft) above sea level in the foothills of the eastern Himalayas. In its native environment it experiences cold winters, including snowfall and frequent frost, making it one of the most cold-tolerant members of the genus.

Despite its relatively large size, the palm went unrecognized by science until late in the twentieth century, even though the region had long been botanically explored. After the first population was documented in northeastern India, additional populations were later identified in nearby areas. It requires pollination to fruit, and rarely flowers.

It is sometimes used as material to build shelters.
