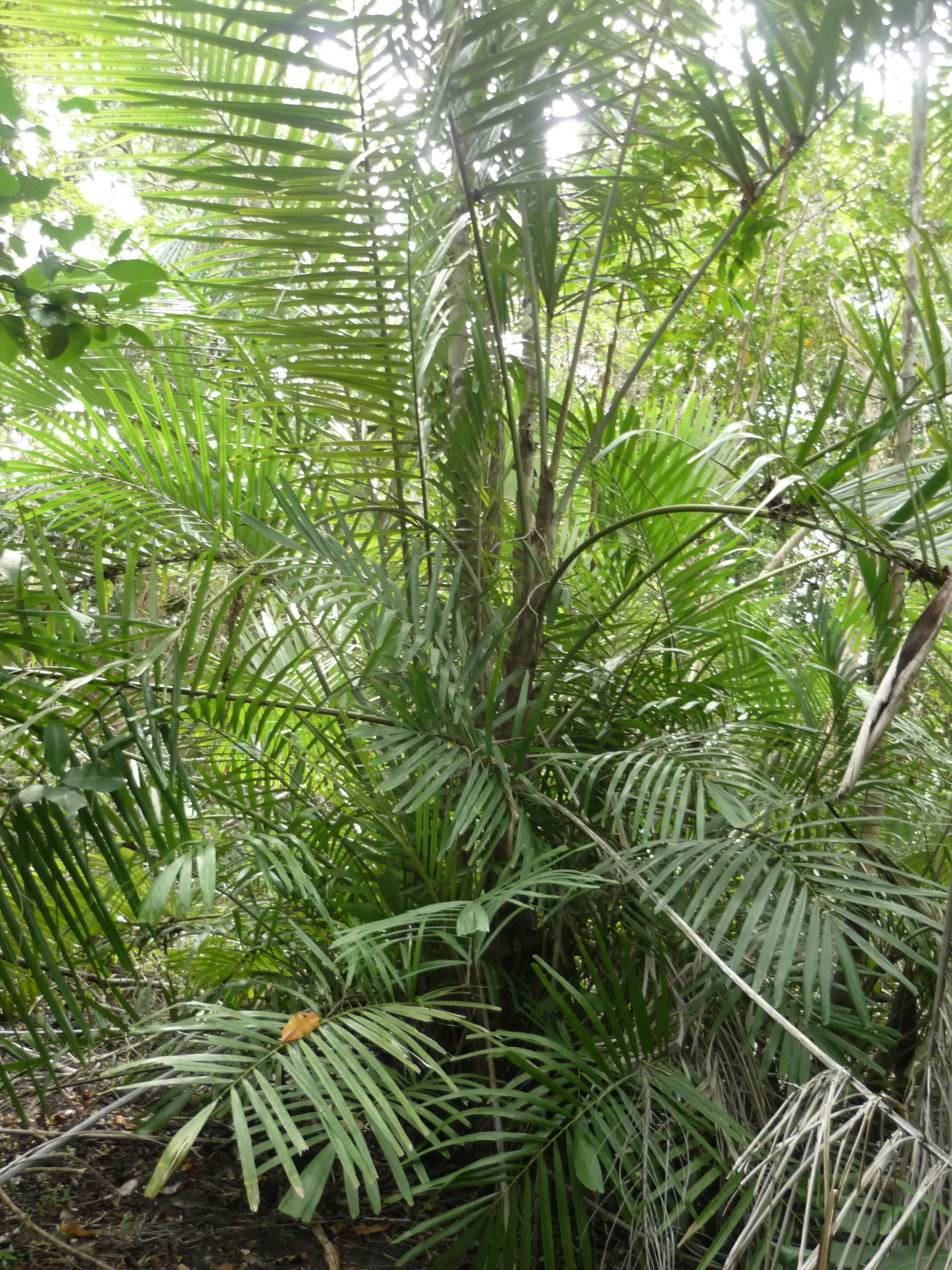
- Arenga microcarpa, GrooteEylandt, NT Herbarium

Scientific classification
- Kingdom: Plantae
- Clade: Tracheophytes
- Clade: Angiosperms
- Clade: Monocots
- Clade: Commelinids
- Order: Arecales
- Family: Arecaceae
- Genus: Arenga
- Species: A. microcarpa

Binomial name
- Arenga microcarpa Becc.

= Arenga microcarpa =

Species of palm

Arenga microcarpa, also known aren sagu or Sagu Baruk, is a perennial densely clumping palm native to the Moluccas and Papua New Guinea and cultivated in open lowland areas in northern Australia and Indonesia.

The palm grows to 7 m (23 ft). It has dark glossy green leaves with whitish undersides and small red fruit.

The Sagu Baruk palm is cultivated on the Talaud and Sangihe Islands for extraction of starch from the pith. It is reported that Sagu flour is the primary food source for 88% of the Sangihe Island population.
