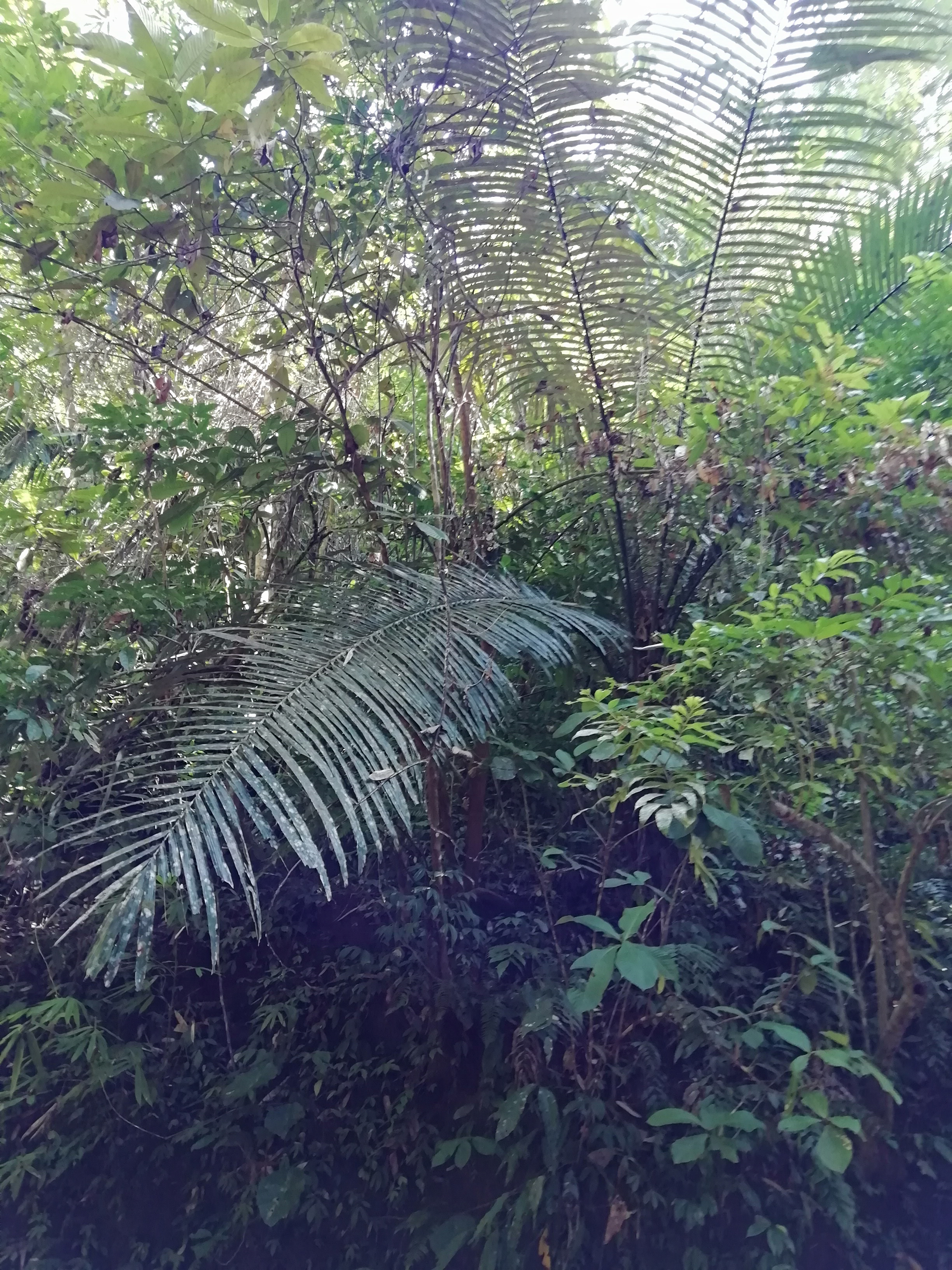
- In Bangladesh

Conservation status
- Least Concern (IUCN 3.1)

Scientific classification
- Kingdom: Plantae
- Clade: Tracheophytes
- Clade: Angiosperms
- Clade: Monocots
- Clade: Commelinids
- Order: Arecales
- Family: Arecaceae
- Genus: Arenga
- Species: A. westerhoutii

Binomial name
- Arenga westerhoutii Griff.

Synonyms
- Saguerus westerhoutii (Griff.) H.Wendl. & Drude

= Arenga westerhoutii =

Species of Asian palm

Arenga westerhoutii is a single-stemmed, evergreen palm found in tropical rainforest. It grows up to 12 meters tall and is one of the largest species in the genus Arenga. The unbranched stem is about 40cms in diameter. The palm has ornamental value. It is distributed in Bangladesh, India (Assam), Cambodia, East Himalaya, Laos, Malaya, Myanmar, and Thailand.
