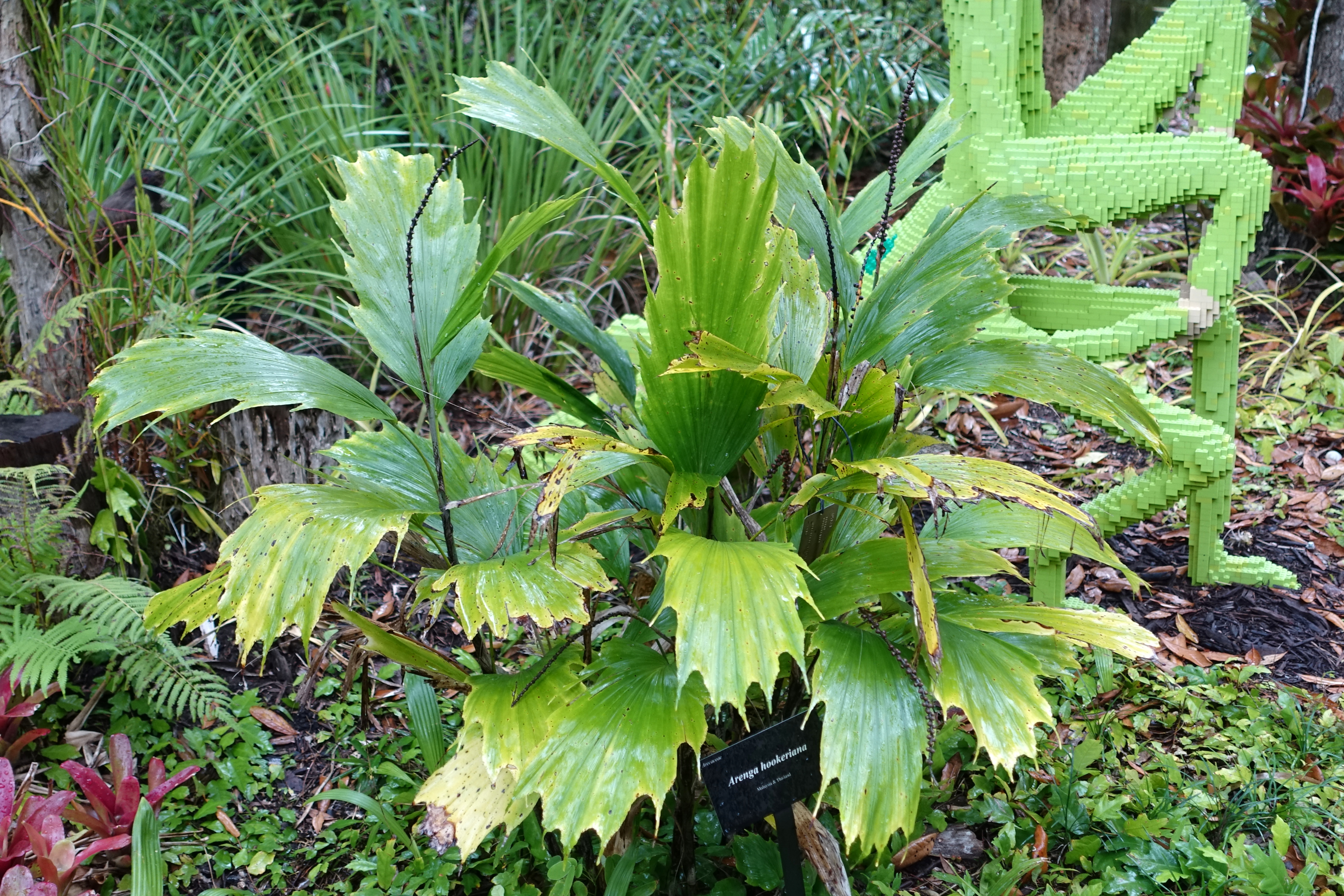

Scientific classification
- Kingdom: Plantae
- Clade: Tracheophytes
- Clade: Angiosperms
- Clade: Monocots
- Clade: Commelinids
- Order: Arecales
- Family: Arecaceae
- Genus: Arenga
- Species: A. hookeriana

Binomial name
- Arenga hookeriana (Becc.) Whitmore

= Arenga hookeriana =

Species of palm

Arenga hookeriana (commonly known as the hooker fishtail palm) is a species of flowering plant in the family Arecaceae found in Peninsular Malaysia and Thailand.

== Description ==
This understory palm forms dense clumps, producing multiple slender, brown cane-like stems that emerge from the base. It thrives in shaded environments and is well-adapted to humid, tropical conditions. Its clustering growth habit allows it to spread gradually, creating a bushy appearance. The stems are covered with persistent leaf bases, giving the plant a textured look.

The leaves are palmate, dark green on the upper surface, and feature a striking silvery underside that enhances their visual appeal. They are typically undivided, with an oblong shape and slightly indented or lobed margins. The tips of the leaves are sharply pointed, and the leaf structure is supported by long, sturdy petioles extending from the base. These petioles are smooth and provide flexibility, allowing the leaves to sway with the wind.

The palm produces inflorescences that emerge from between the leaves. These are typically simple, though occasionally branched, and consist of individual peduncles for male and female flowers, which grow on separate stems. The flowers are small but numerous, contributing to the plant's ornamental appeal.
