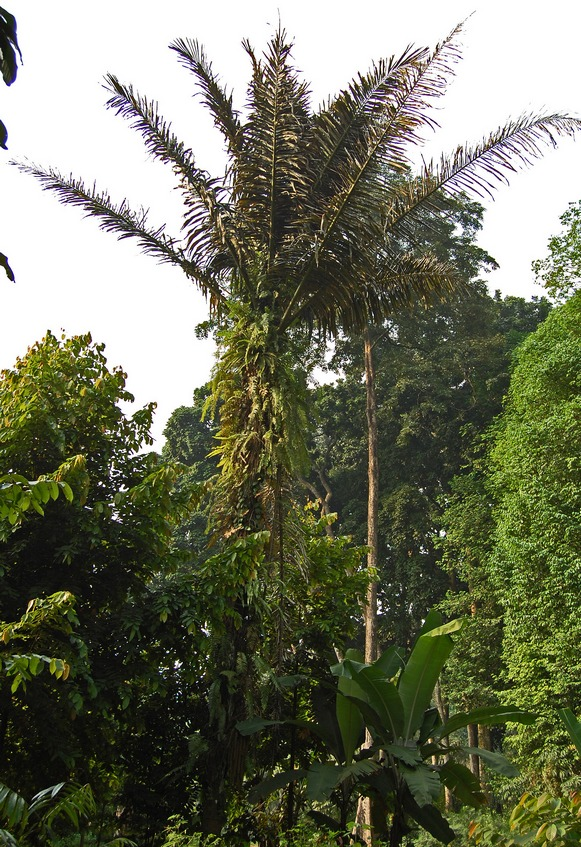
- Arenga pinnata

Scientific classification
- Kingdom: Plantae
- Clade: Tracheophytes
- Clade: Angiosperms
- Clade: Monocots
- Clade: Commelinids
- Order: Arecales
- Family: Arecaceae
- Tribe: Caryoteae
- Genus: Arenga; Labill. ex DC.

Synonyms
- Saguerus Steck; Gomutus Corrêa; Blancoa Blume 1843, illegitimate homonym, not Lindl. 1840; Didymosperma H.Wendl. & Drude ex Hook.f.

= Arenga =

Genus of palms

Arenga is a genus of palms, native to Southeast Asia, southern China, New Guinea, and northern Australia. They are small to medium-sized palms, growing to 2–20 m tall, with pinnate leaves 2–12 m long. Arenga palms can grow in areas with little sunlight and relatively infertile soil.

== Species ==
- Arenga australasica (H.Wendl. & Drude) S.T.Blake ex H.E.Moore – Queensland
- Arenga brevipes Becc. – Sumatra, Borneo
- Arenga caudata (Lour.) H.E.Moore – Guangxi, Hainan, Indochina
- Arenga distincta Mogea – Borneo
- Arenga engleri Becc. – Taiwan
- Arenga hastata (Becc.) Whitmore – Thailand, Malaysia, Borneo, Sumatra
- Arenga hookeriana (Becc.) Whitmore – Thailand, Malaysia
- Arenga listeri Becc. – Christmas Island
- Arenga longicarpa C.F.Wei – Guangdong
- Arenga longipes Mogea – Sumatra
- Arenga micrantha C.F.Wei – Tibet, Bhutan, Arunachal Pradesh
- Arenga microcarpa Becc. in K.M.Schumann & U.M.Hollrung – Maluku, New Guinea, Northern Territory of Australia
- Arenga mindorensis Becc. – Mindoro
- Arenga obtusifolia Mart.- Thailand, Malaysia, Borneo, Java
- Arenga pinnata (Wurmb) Merr. – Assam, Indochina, Philippines, Sulawesi; naturalized in southern China, Benin, Maluku, New Guinea, Hawaii
- Arenga plicata Mogea – Sumatra
- Arenga porphyrocarpa (Blume ex Mart.) H.E.Moore – Java, Sumatra
- Arenga retroflorescens H.E.Moore & Meijer – Sabah
- Arenga ryukyuensis A.J.Hend – Ryukyu Islands
- Arenga talamauensis Mogea – Sumatra
- Arenga tremula (Blanco) Becc. – Philippines
- Arenga undulatifolia Becc. – Borneo, Palawan, Sulawesi
- Arenga westerhoutii Griff. – southern China, Indochina, Assam, Arunachal Pradesh, Bhutan
- Arenga wightii Griff. – India
