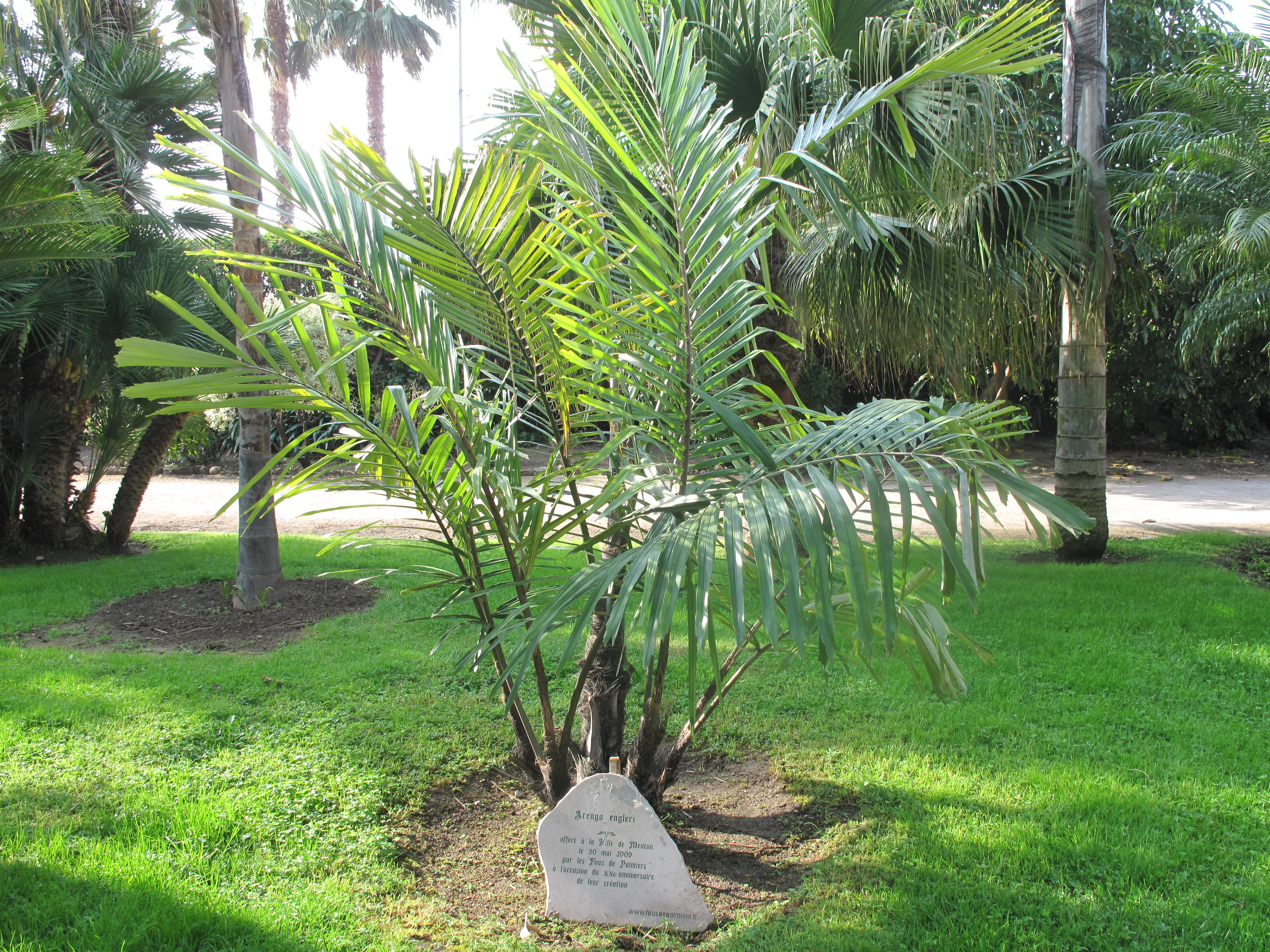

Scientific classification
- Kingdom: Plantae
- Clade: Tracheophytes
- Clade: Angiosperms
- Clade: Monocots
- Clade: Commelinids
- Order: Arecales
- Family: Arecaceae
- Genus: Arenga
- Species: A. engleri

Binomial name
- Arenga engleri Becc.

= Arenga engleri =

Species of palm

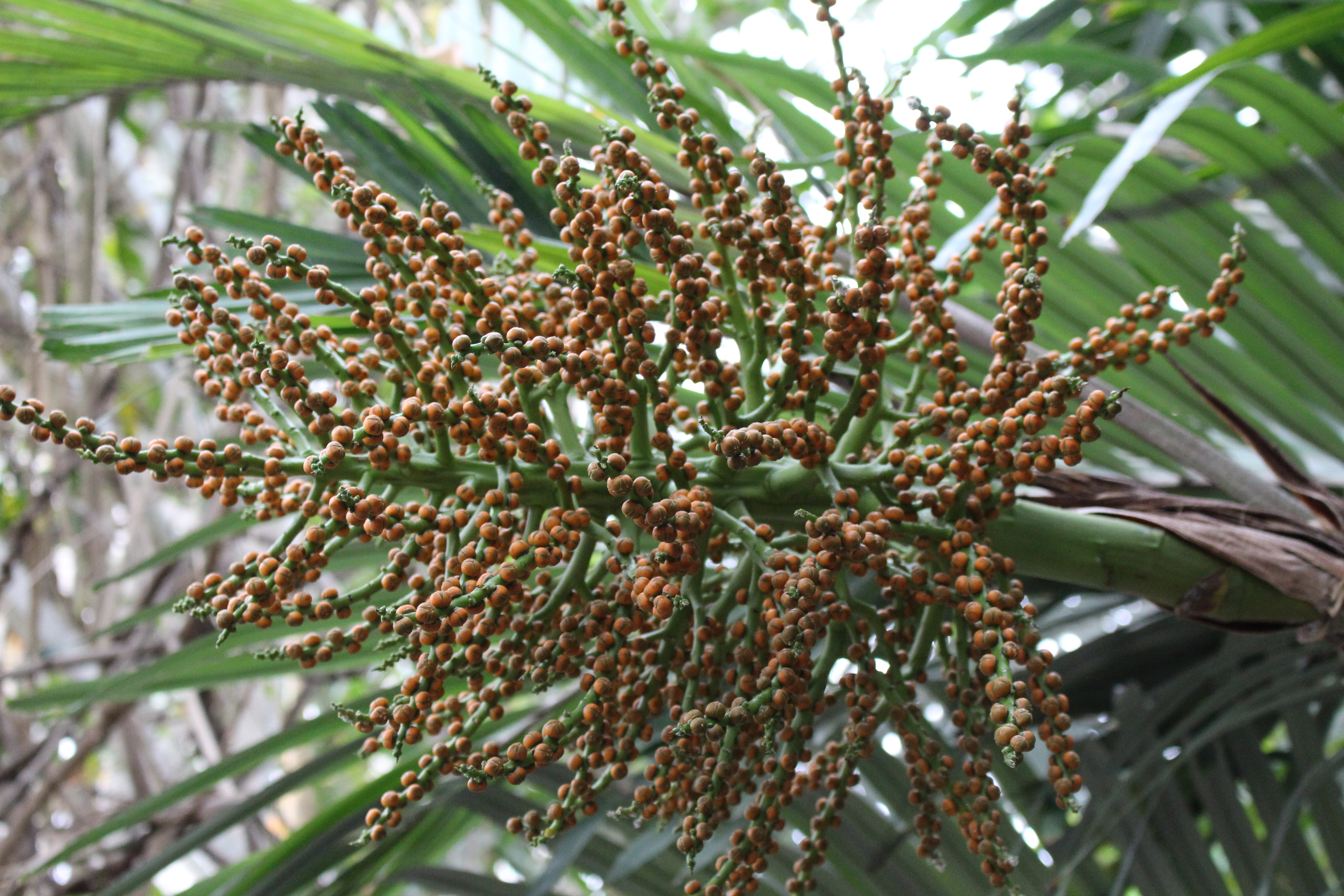
Inflorescence. A. engleri is monoecious but the female and male flowers grow on different peduncles

Arenga engleri, or the Formosa palm, Taiwan sugar palm, dwarf sugar palm, or Taiwan arenga palm, is a species of flowering plant in the family Arecaceae. The plant rarely grows more than 10 ft. tall, with a stem diameter of 6in. and a spread of 16 ft. The palm is native to Taiwan as well as Japan's Ryukyu Islands. The fruit of the palm is known to cause a severe allergic reaction.

== Description ==
Arenga engleri, is a striking tropical species admired for its ornamental appeal. This clustering palm features multiple stems enveloped in fine black fibers, adding to its distinctive appearance.

Its lush, arching leaves have a characteristic fishtail shape. The deep green, pinnate leaflets often exhibit a gentle twist, creating a slightly spiraled effect. Each leaflet emerges from a thornless midrib, displaying a dark-green to olive hue on the upper surface and a silvery sheen underneath. Notably, the leaflets have a unique induplicate cross-section and are arranged in a single plane along the stem.

Among the foliage, the palm produces spikelike inflorescences containing both male and female flowers, allowing for self-pollination. These blossoms, available in shades of red, orange, or green, emit a pleasant fragrance. The plant eventually bears small, spherical fruits that mature to a deep red or purple color, each containing one to three seeds.

== Gallery ==
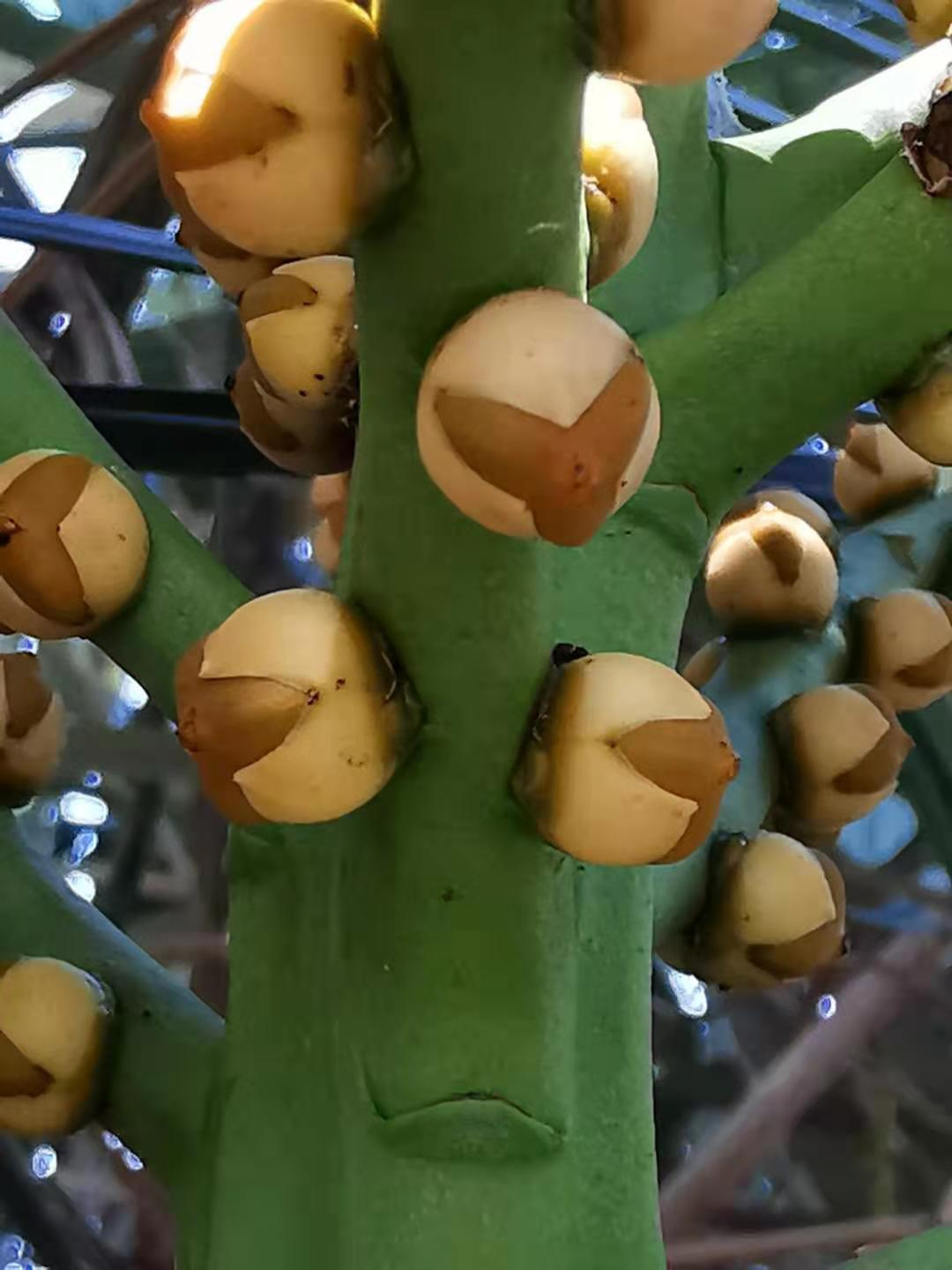
Female flower bud.

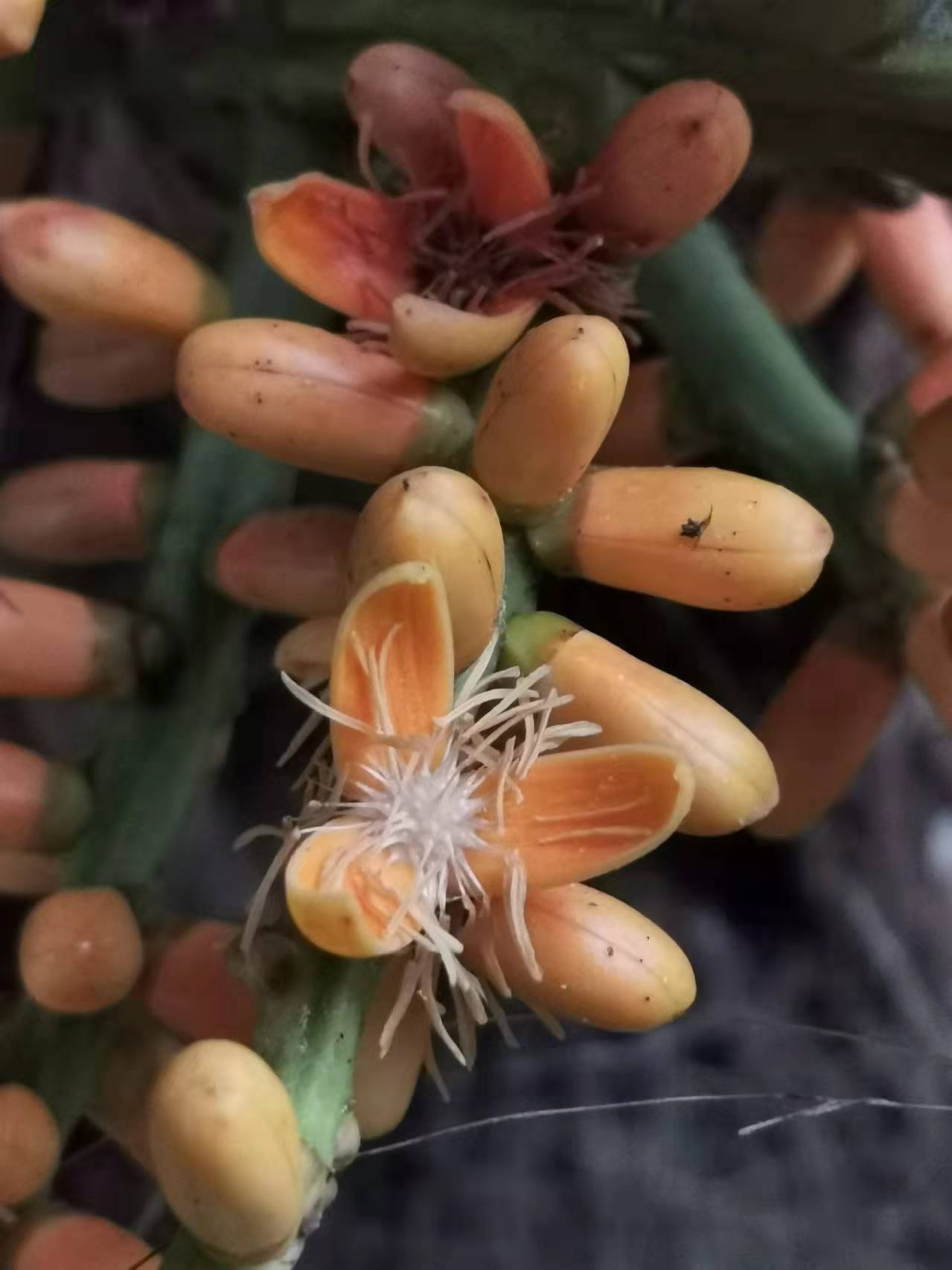
Male flower bud.

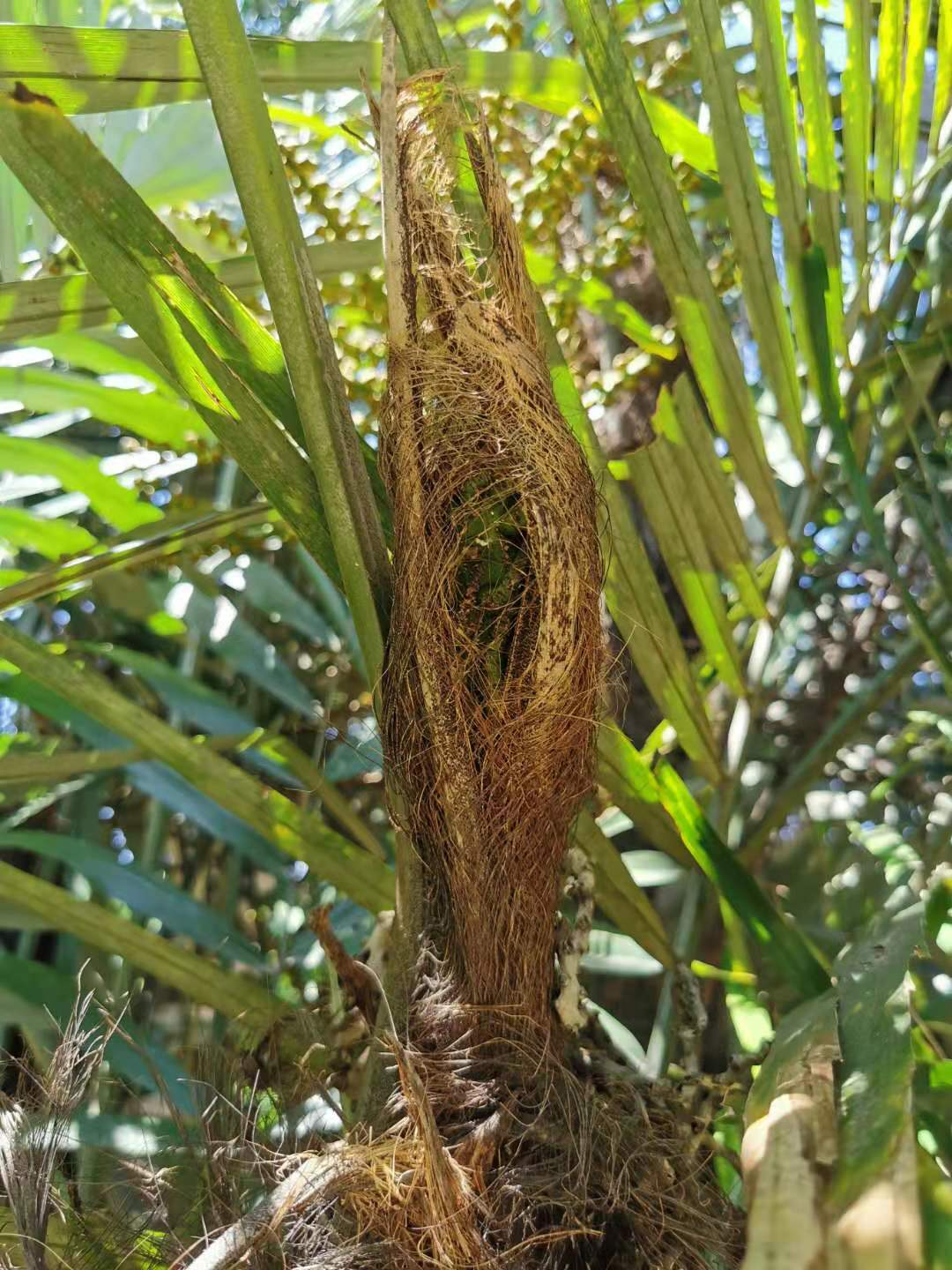
Bracts are covered with fibers.

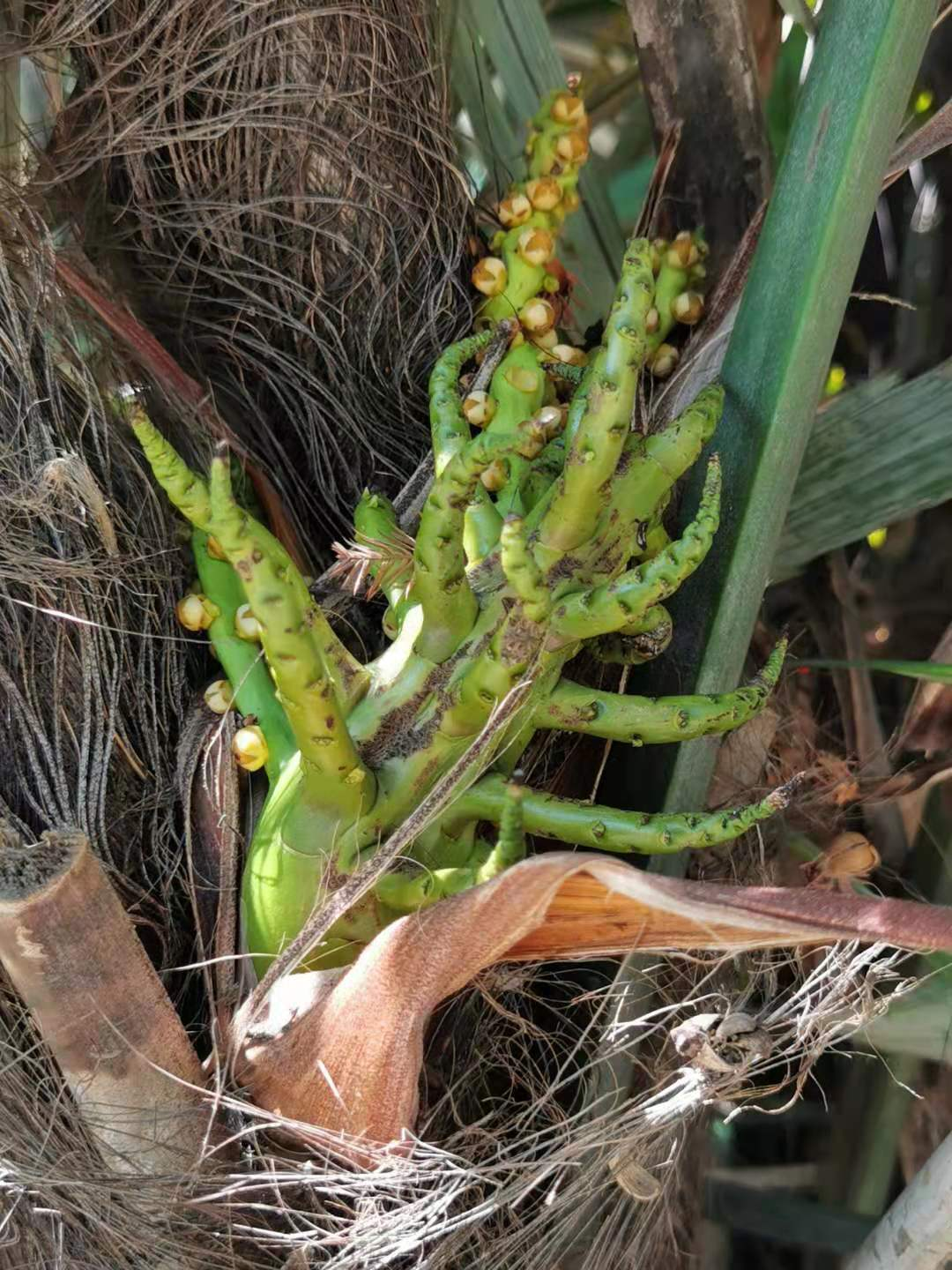
Bracts (Buds are edible).

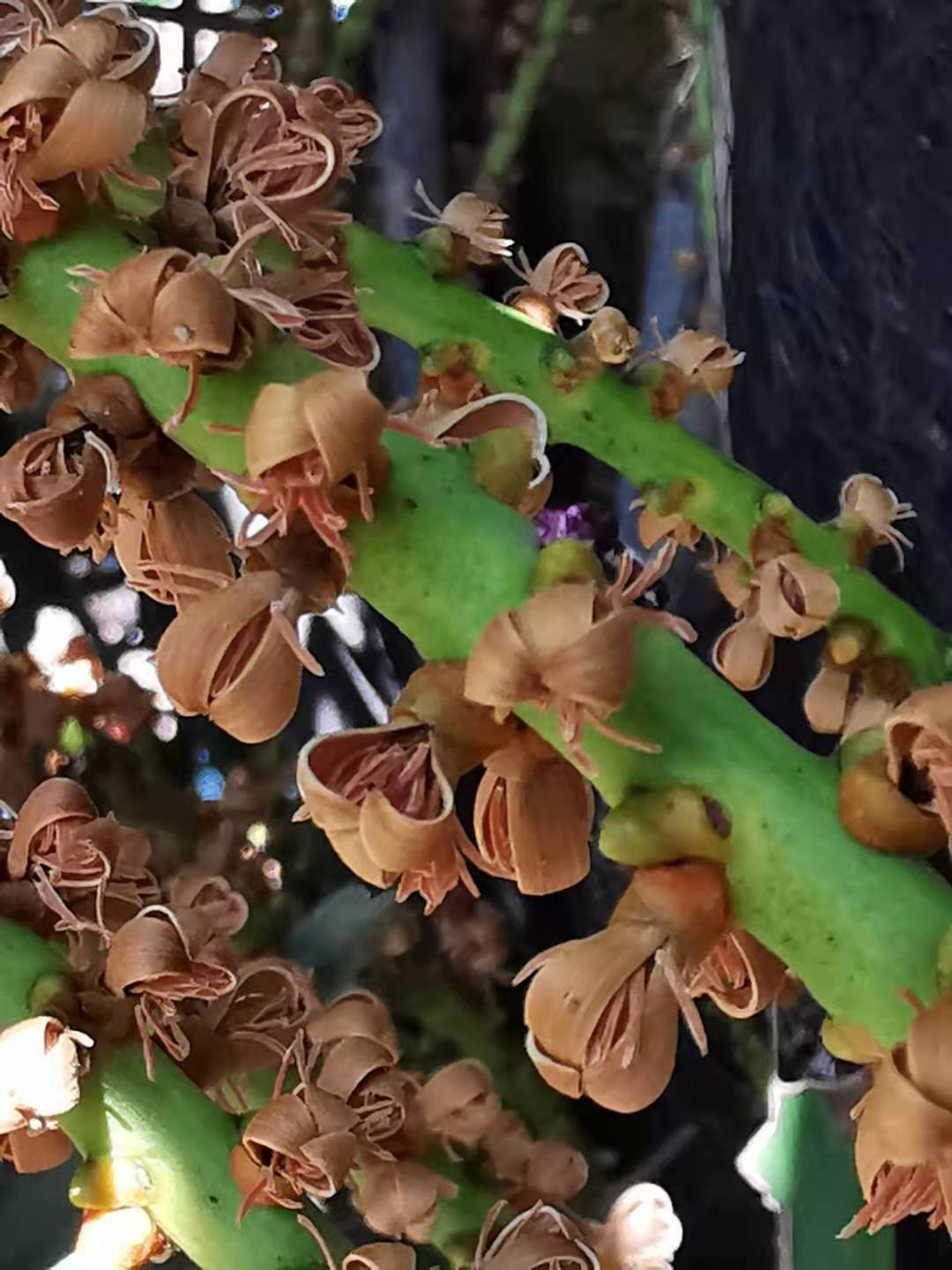
Wilted flowers remain on the stem.

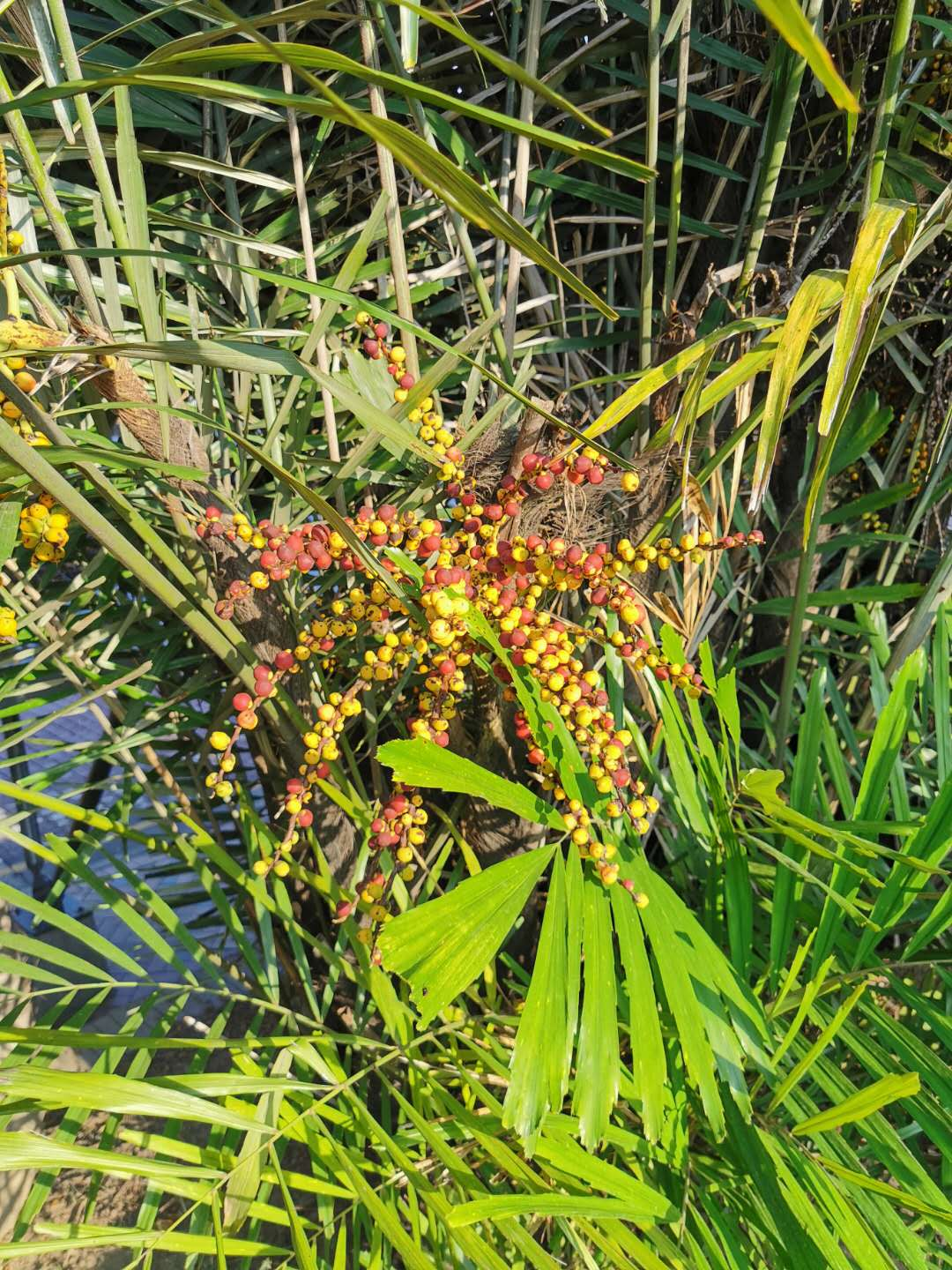
Ripe fruits are black in color and edible.

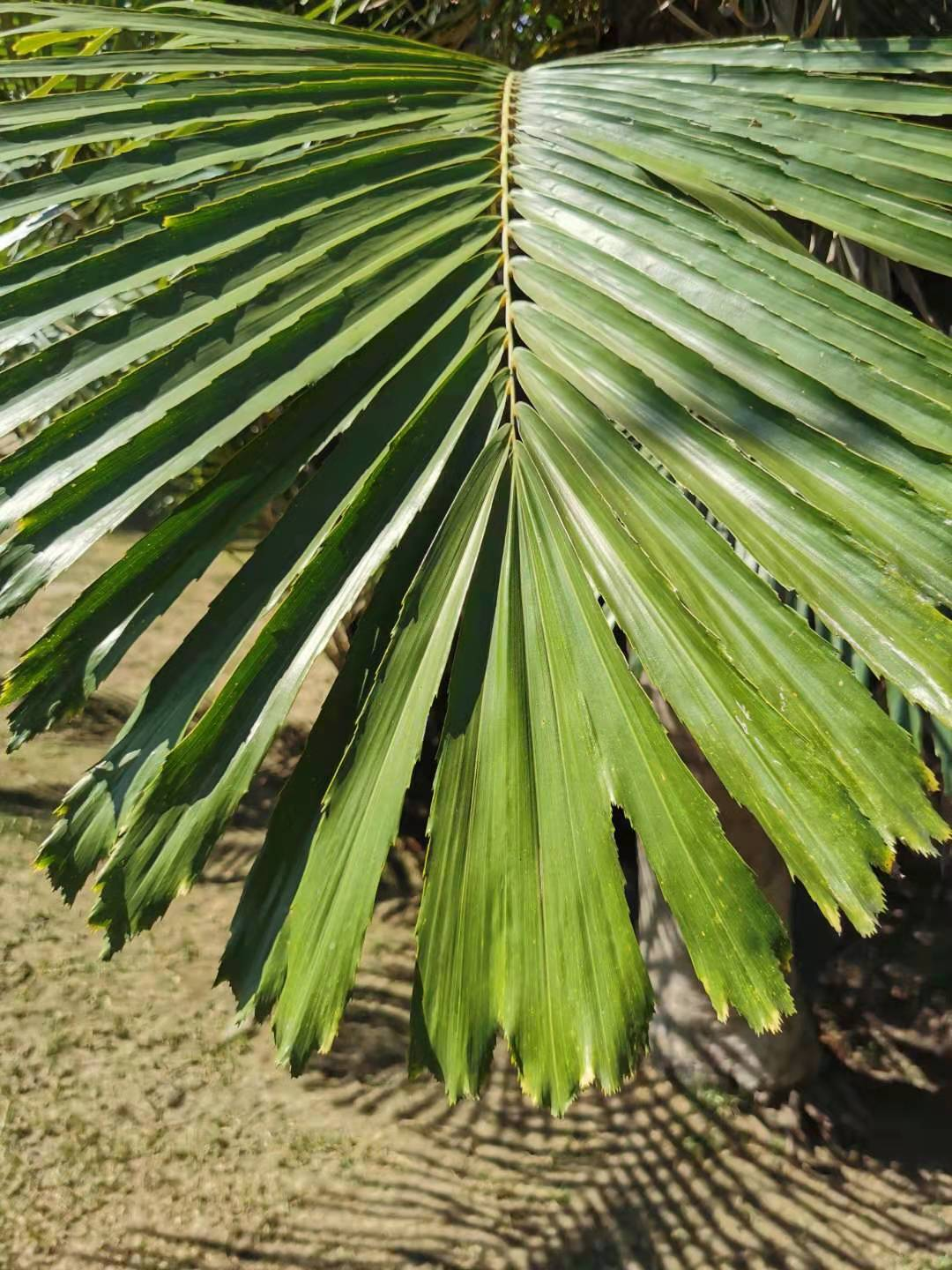
Leaflets with serrated margin.

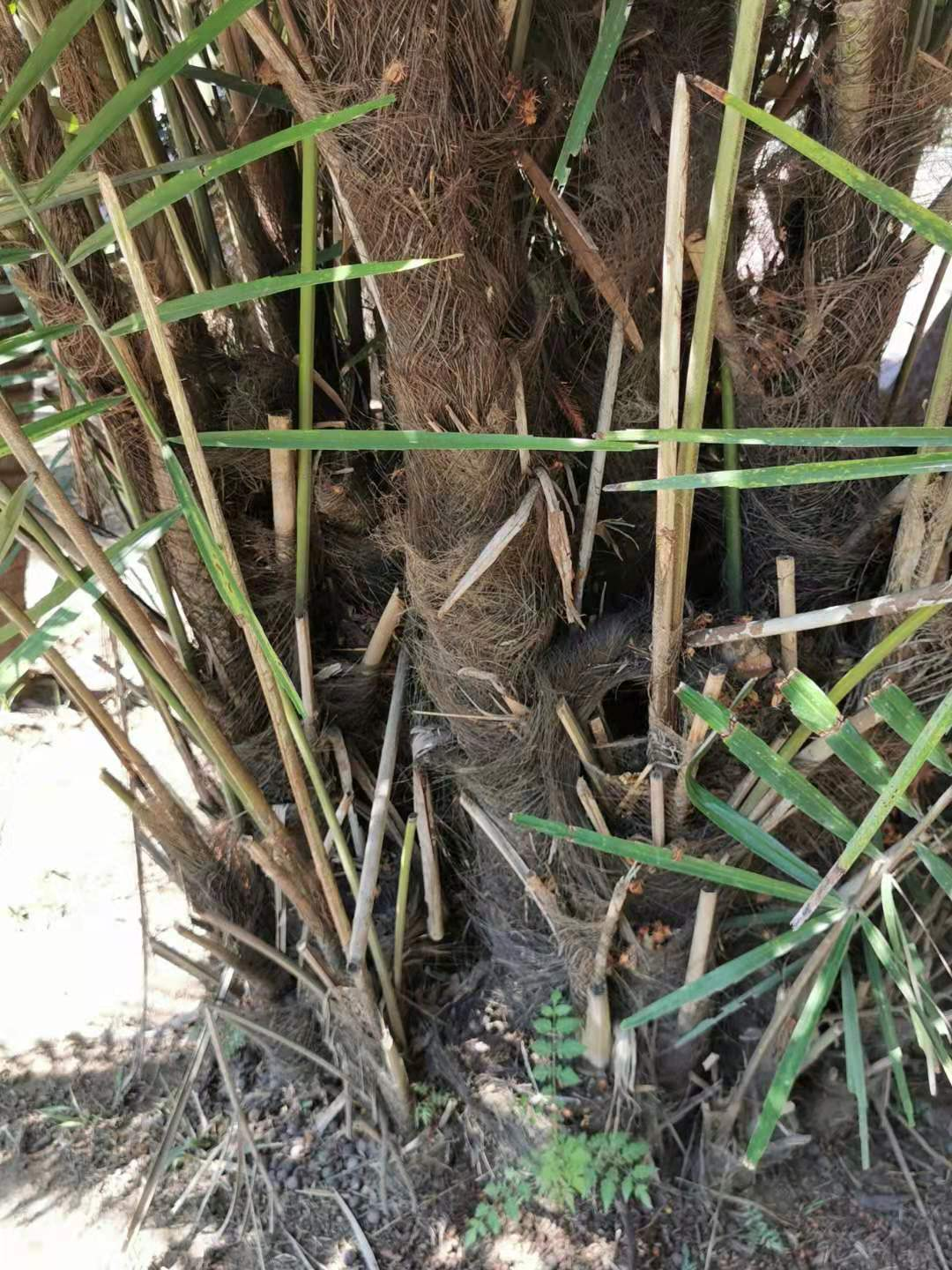
The fiber can be used to make brooms and brushes.
