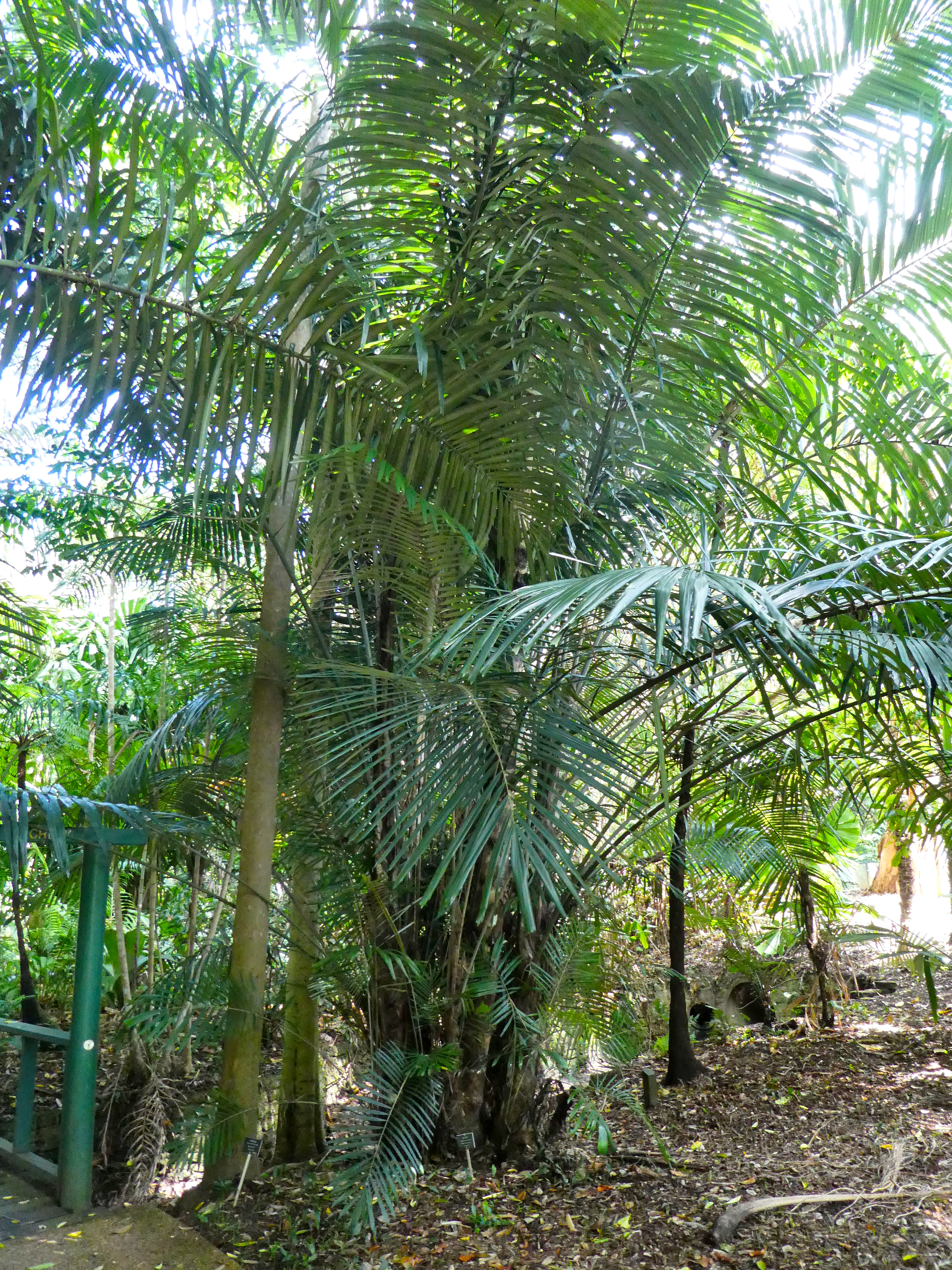
- At Cairns Botanic Gardens

Conservation status
- Vulnerable (NCA)

Scientific classification
- Kingdom: Plantae
- Clade: Tracheophytes
- Clade: Angiosperms
- Clade: Monocots
- Clade: Commelinids
- Order: Arecales
- Family: Arecaceae
- Genus: Arenga
- Species: A. australasica

Binomial name
- Arenga australasica (H.Wendl. & Drude) S.T.Blake ex H.E.Moore

Synonyms
- Normanbya australasicus (H.Wendl. & Drude) Baill.; Saguerus australasicus H.Wendl. & Drude; Arenga gracilicaulis F.M.Bailey; Arenga microcarpa Becc.; Arenga microcarpa var. keyensis Becc.; Didymosperma humile Lauterb. & K.Schum.; Didymosperma microcarpum (Becc.) Warb. ex K.Schum. & Lauterb.; Didymosperma novoguineense Warb. ex K.Schum. & Lauterb.

= Arenga australasica =

Species of flowering plant

Arenga australasica, commonly known as arenga palm or southern arenga, is a plant in the palm family Arecaceae found only in the Northern Territory and Queensland, Australia. It has a clustering habit and it may reach 20 m (66 ft) in height with a trunk diameter of 30 cm (12 in). Fronds can be up to 4 m (13 ft) long with numerous leaflets (often more than 100), dark green above and grey underneath. Inflorescences are produced from the bases of the fronds and can reach a length of 2 m (6 ft 7 in), carrying numerous pendant panicles of flowers. The flowers are in clusters of 3 with one pistillate (functionally female) and two staminate (functionally male) flowers. The red or purple fruit are almost spherical in shape, about 28 mm (1.1 in) diameter and contain two or three seeds.

== Taxonomy ==
The species was first described in 1875 as Saguerus australasicus by botanists Hermann Wendland and Carl Georg Oscar Drude, and then later transferred to the current binomial by Stanley Thatcher Blake and Carl Georg Oscar Drude in 1963.

== Distribution and habitat ==
This tree is found in the Top End of the Northern Territory, some islands of the Torres Strait, and the east coast of Queensland from the top of Cape York Peninsula south to about Cardwell.

== Conservation ==
This species is listed as vulnerable under the Queensland Government's Nature Conservation Act. As of 11 December 2024, it has not been assessed by the International Union for Conservation of Nature (IUCN).

== Gallery ==
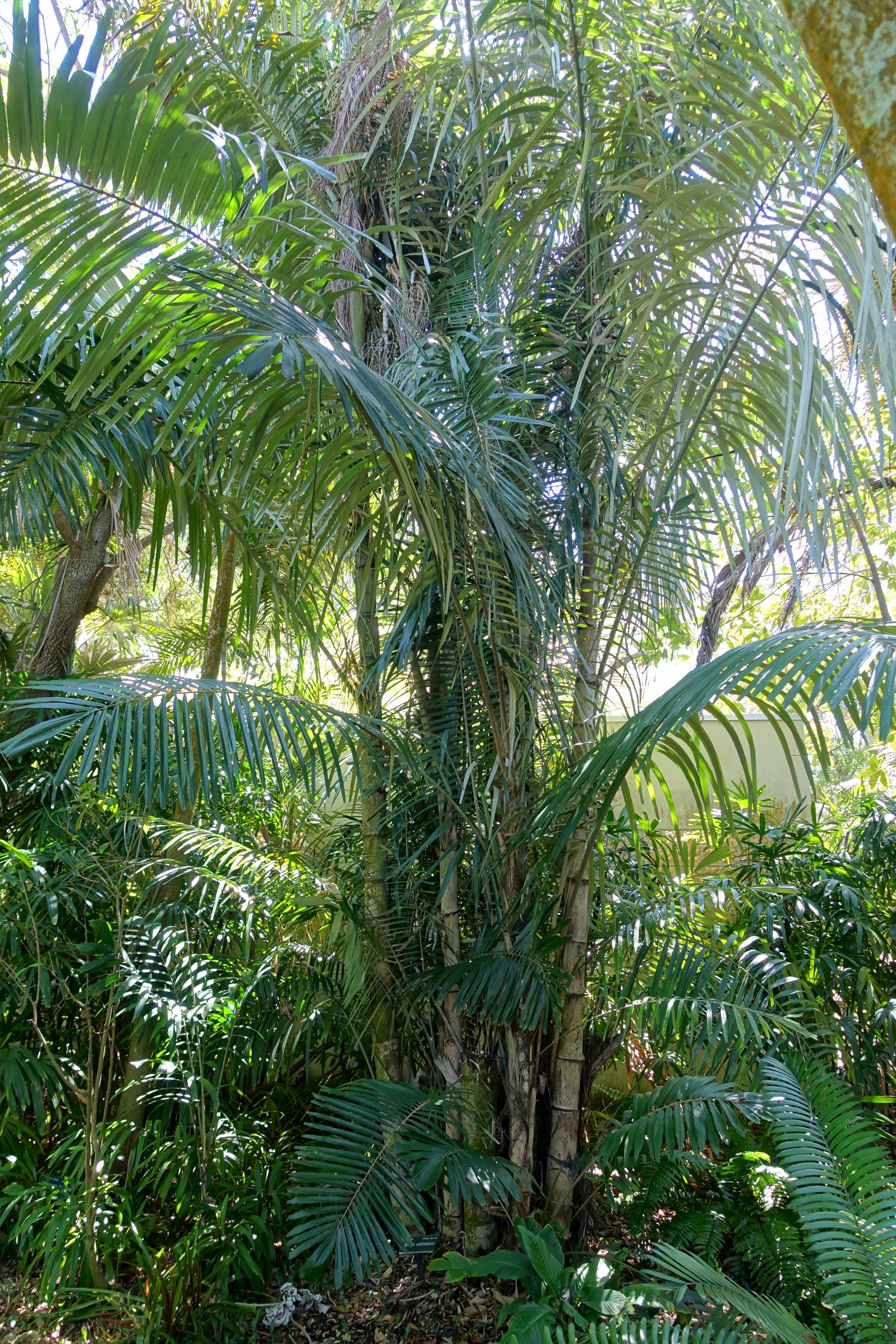
Clustering habit

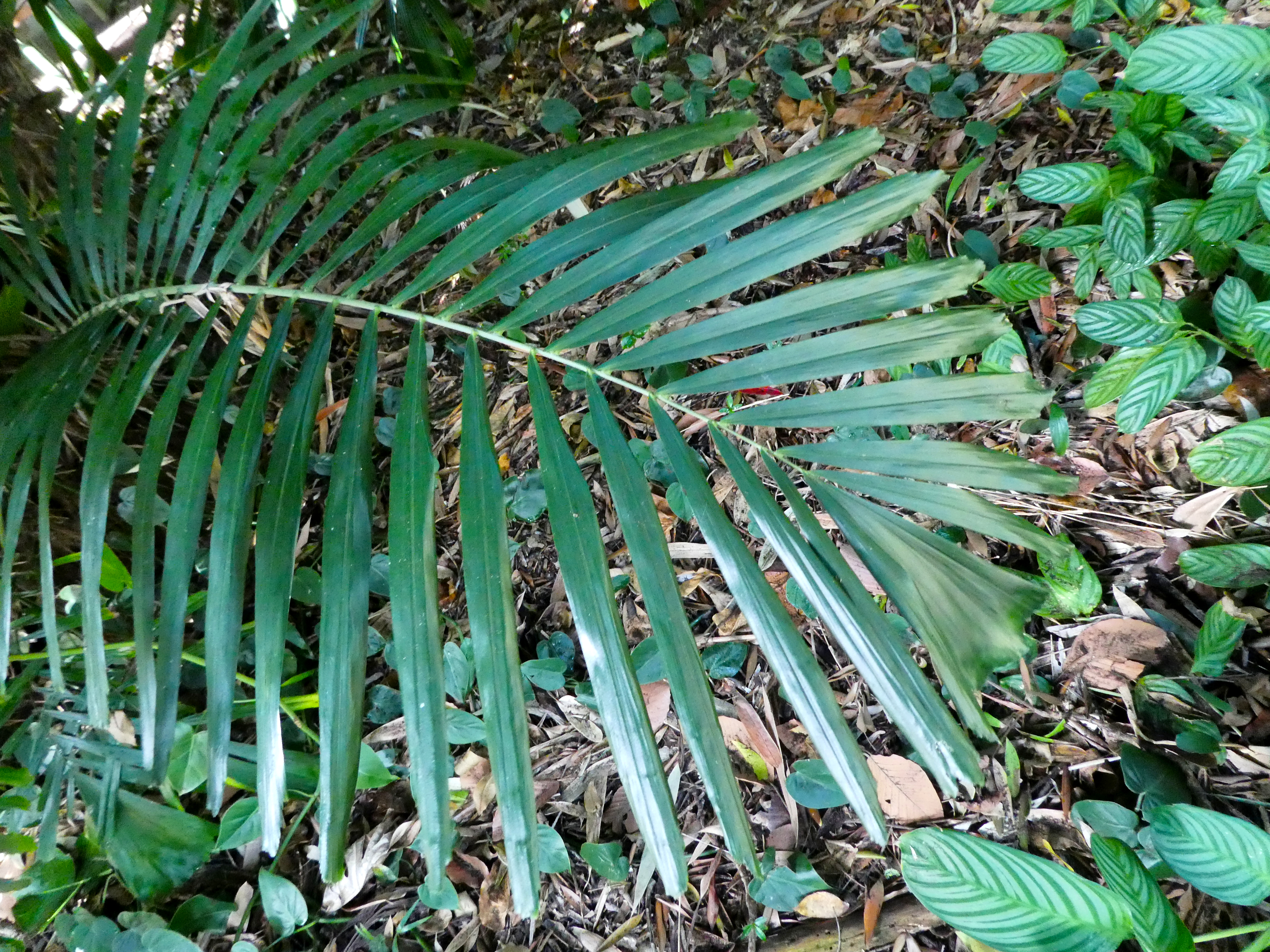
Frond

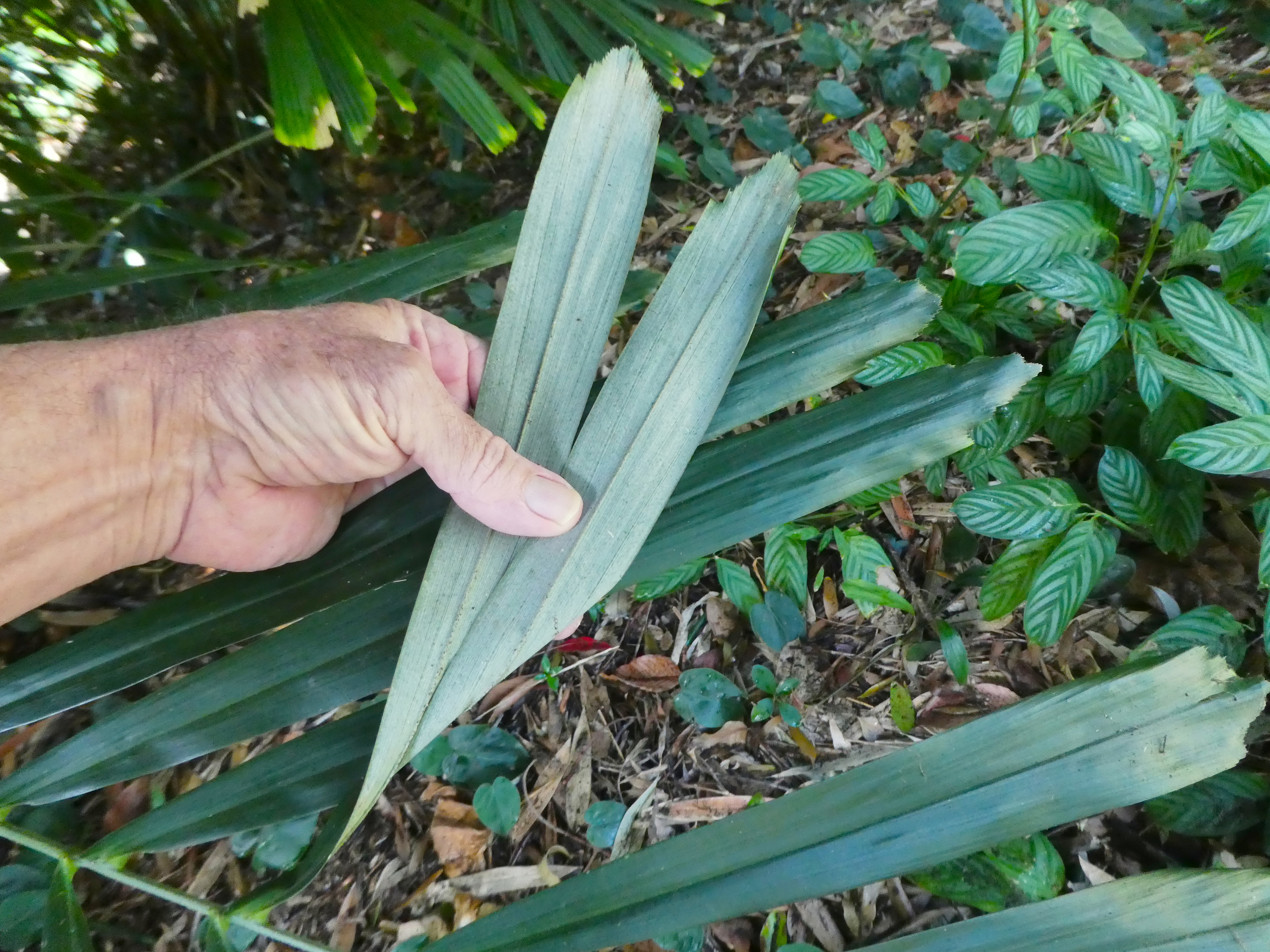
Underside of leaflets

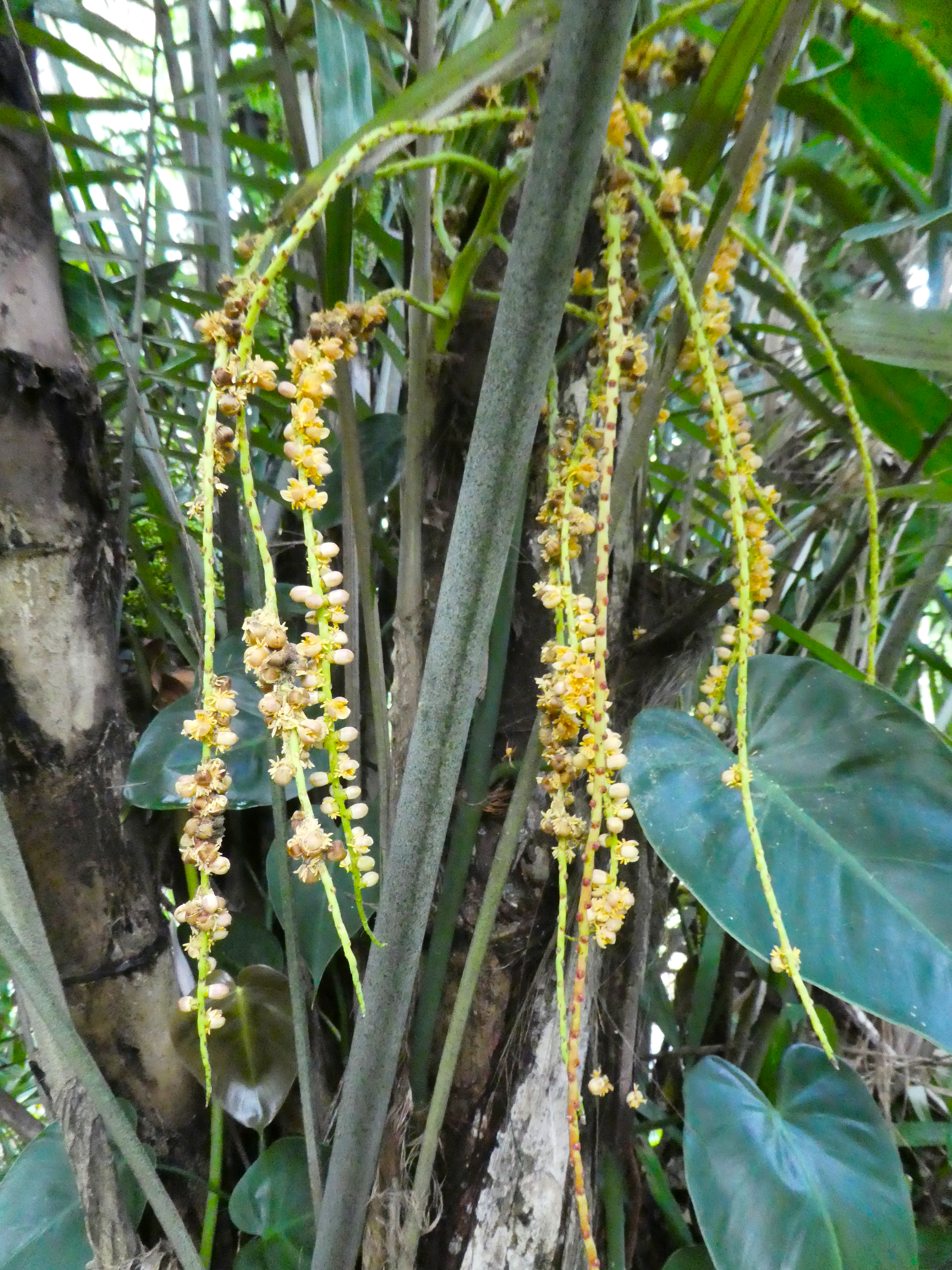
Inflorescence

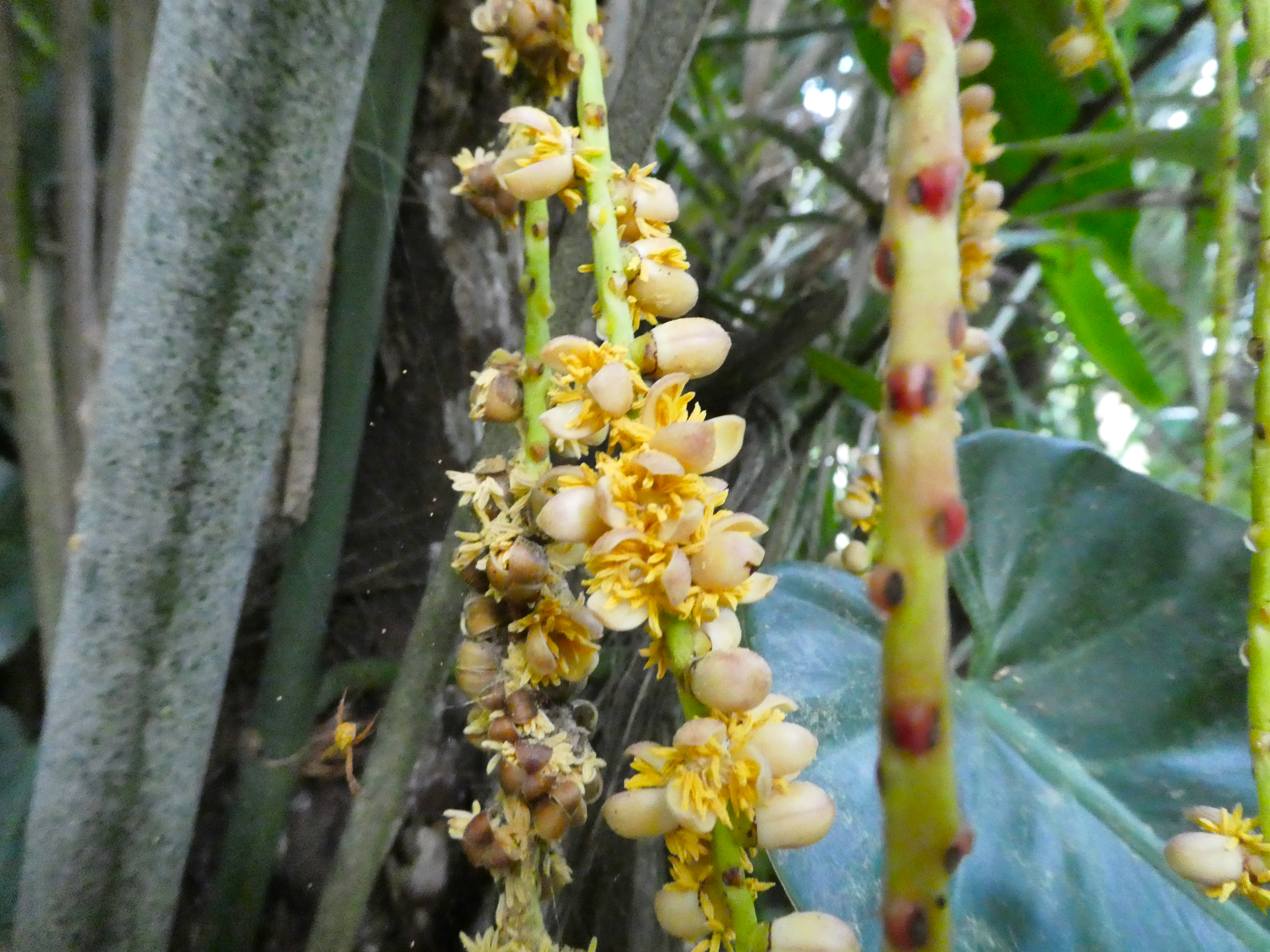
Flower close up
