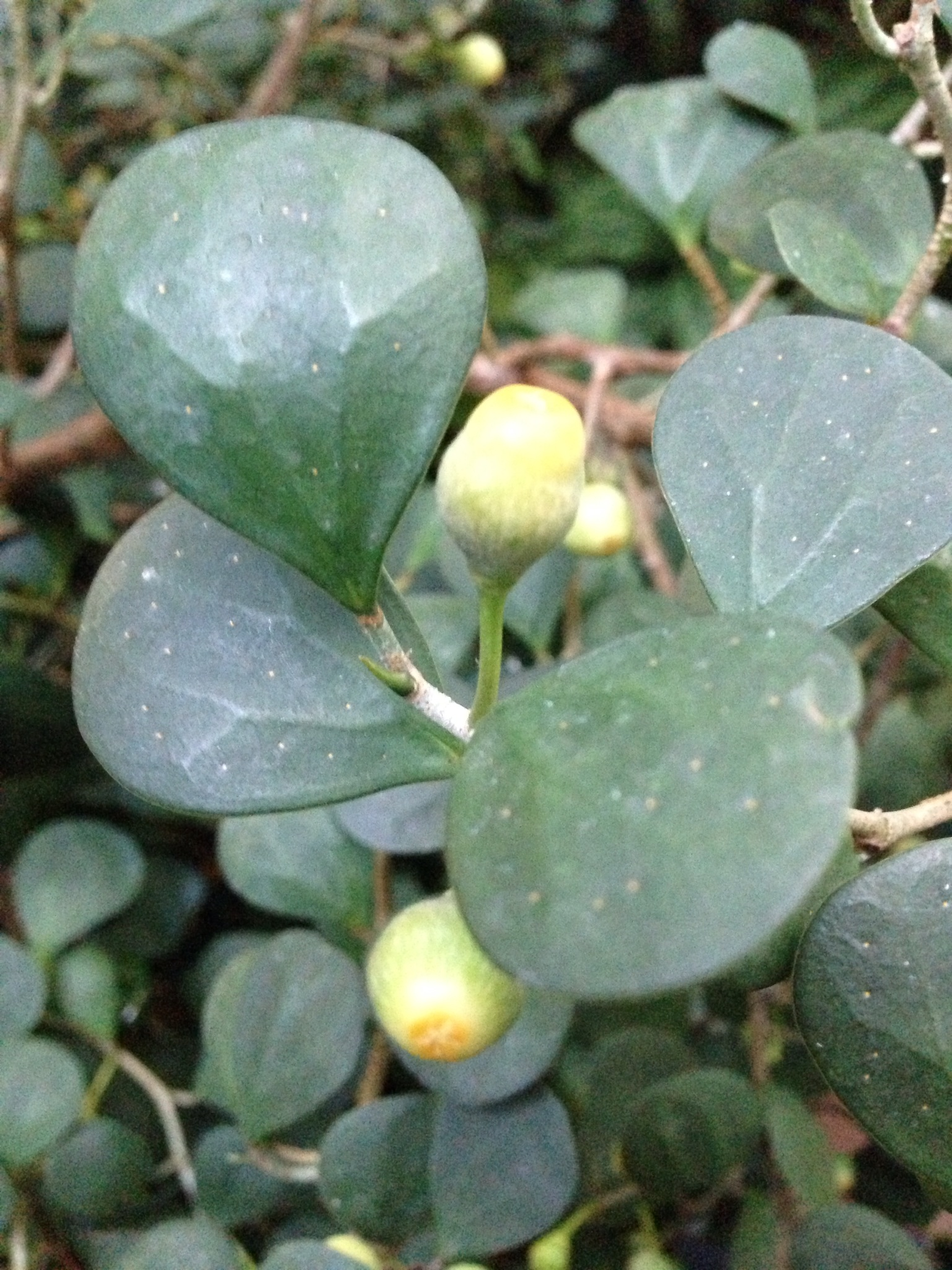
- At Olbrich Botanical Gardens, Madison, WI

Conservation status
- Least Concern (IUCN 3.1)

Scientific classification
- Kingdom: Plantae
- Clade: Tracheophytes
- Clade: Angiosperms
- Clade: Eudicots
- Clade: Rosids
- Order: Rosales
- Family: Moraceae
- Genus: Ficus
- Subgenus: F. subg. Ficus
- Species: F. deltoidea

Binomial name
- Ficus deltoidea Jack

Subspecies
- Ficus deltoidea subsp. deltoidea; Ficus deltoidea subsp. motleyana (Miq.) C.C.Berg

Synonyms
- Synonymy: Ficus diversifolia var. deltoidea (Jack) Ridl. synonyms of subsp. deltoidea: Erythrogyne lutescens (Desf.) Vis.; Ficus deltoidea var. angustifolia (Miq.) Corner; Ficus deltoidea f. angustissima Corner; Ficus deltoidea var. arenaria Corner; Ficus deltoidea var. bilobata Corner; Ficus deltoidea var. borneensis Corner; Ficus deltoidea var. kunstleri (King) Corner; Ficus deltoidea f. longipedunculata Corner; Ficus deltoidea var. lutescens (Desf.) Corner; Ficus deltoidea var. peltata Corner; Ficus deltoidea var. recurvata Kochummen; Ficus deltoidea f. subhirsuta Corner; Ficus deltoidea f. subsessilis (Miq.) Corner; Ficus deltoidea var. trengganuensis Corner; Ficus diversifolia Blume; Ficus diversifolia var. kunstleri King; Ficus diversifolia var. latifolia Kurz; Ficus diversifolia var. latissima Miq.; Ficus diversifolia var. lutescens (Desf.) King; Ficus diversifolia var. ovoidea (Jack) King; Ficus diversifolia var. subsessilis Miq.; Ficus lutescens Desf.; Ficus ovoidea Jack; Ficus ovoidea var. lutescens (Desf.) Kuntze; Ficus pisiformis Kunth; Ficus retusa var. ovoidea (Jack) Miq.; Ficus sideroxylifolia Griff.; Ficus spathulata Miq.; Ficus viscifolia Kunth & C.D.Bouché; Synoecia diversifolia (Blume) Miq.; Synoecia diversifolia var. angustifolia Miq.; Urostigma ovoideum (Jack) Miq. synonyms of subsp. motleyana: Ficus deltoidea var. motleyana (Miq.) Corner; Ficus deltoidea var. oligoneura (Miq.) Corner; Ficus landonii Symington; Ficus motleyana Miq.; Ficus oligoneura (Miq.) Miq.; Synoecia grandifolia Kurz ex Teijsm. & Binn.; Urostigma oligoneuron Miq.

= Ficus deltoidea =

Species of flowering plant

Ficus deltoidea, commonly known as mistletoe fig (mas cotek in Malaysian, tabat barito in Indonesia, or สาลิกาลิ้นทอง in Thai) is a species of flowering plant in the family Moraceae. It is native to Peninsular Thailand and parts of Malesia (Borneo, Java, Peninsular Malaysia, the Maluku Islands, Sulawesi, and Sumatra), and widely naturalized in other parts of the world.

== Description ==
F. deltoidea is an evergreen shrub or small tree, growing up to about 2 m tall, with thick leaves that are deltoid in shape, rounded at the apex and tapering at the base. The upper surface of the plants' leaves are dark, shining green, while the lower surface is golden yellow with black spots. Male and female plants are physically distinctive, with the leaves of female plants being big and round, while the leaves of male plants are small, round and long. F. deltoidea can grow on the land (terrestrial plant), on the stone (Lithophyte) or attach to other plants as epiphyte. The plant grows wild in eastern peninsular Malaysia (Kelantan, Terengganu), Sumatra, Java, Borneo (Sabah, Sarawak, Brunei and Kalimantan), Celebes, Palawan and in Mindanao and is used by the traditional medical practitioners in these regions.

== Taxonomy ==
C.C. Berg in his publication in Blumea classified F. deltoidea into two sub species based on difference of the leaf shape, subsp. deltoidea and subsp. motleyana (Miq.) C.C. Berg. F. deltoidea subsp. deltoidea has board leaf shape variation from obtriangular to linear-oblanceolate, include apex and based on lamina variation in the common deltoid shape with furcate midrib. F. deltoidea subsp. motleyana has oblong to lanceolate lamina shape with pinnately vein. The first subspecies with deltoid leaf shape is a common taxa to be used as medicinal plant. Lee et al. (2016) success to conduct molecular analysis with cpDNA and nSSR marker system for F. deltoidea from Peninsular Malaysia and the result support taxonomy classification based on morphological traits.

== Uses ==
Ficus deltoidea is used as an ornamental plant, requiring the protection of glass during winter months, in zones where the temperature falls below 10 °C (50 °F). It requires a sunny, sheltered, south- or east-facing position. In the UK it is a recipient of the Royal Horticultural Society's Award of Garden Merit.

The plant is used in traditional medicine in eastern Peninsular Malaysia and Borneo, where its leaves, fruits, stems and roots are believed to have healing properties. Among the traditional uses attributed to this plant include menstrual cycle regulation; the treatment of post-partum depression, lung diseases, high blood pressure, diabetes, and skin problems; as well as an aphrodisiac for both men and women.

F. deltoidea has been commercialized in the region of its origin, where it is used as an ingredient in herbal drinks, coffee drinks, supplements, and massage oils.

== Chemical composition ==
F. deltoidea has been reported to possess triterpenoids, antinociceptive, anti-inflammatory, antioxidant and natural phenols (flavonoids and proanthocyanins, a type of condensed tannins). Leaf extract treatment to mice indicated decrease of blood sugar level into 32.54% compared to mice without treatment

This plant is not only capable of reducing blood glucose but also improving tissues function, structure and behavioral performance of diabetic rats The percentage of circulating n-3 PUFA, in particular, docosahexaenoic acid (DHA), also showed a significant increase following F. deltoidea intake Treatment with F. deltoidea for eight weeks has been shown to prevent diabetic osteoporosis by increasing osteogenesis and reducing bone oxidative stress F. deltoidea leaves can also improve hormonal balance among letrozole induced polycystic ovarian syndrome (PCOS) rats F. deltoidea also increases serum levels of testosterone, sperm count and motility in diabetic rats
