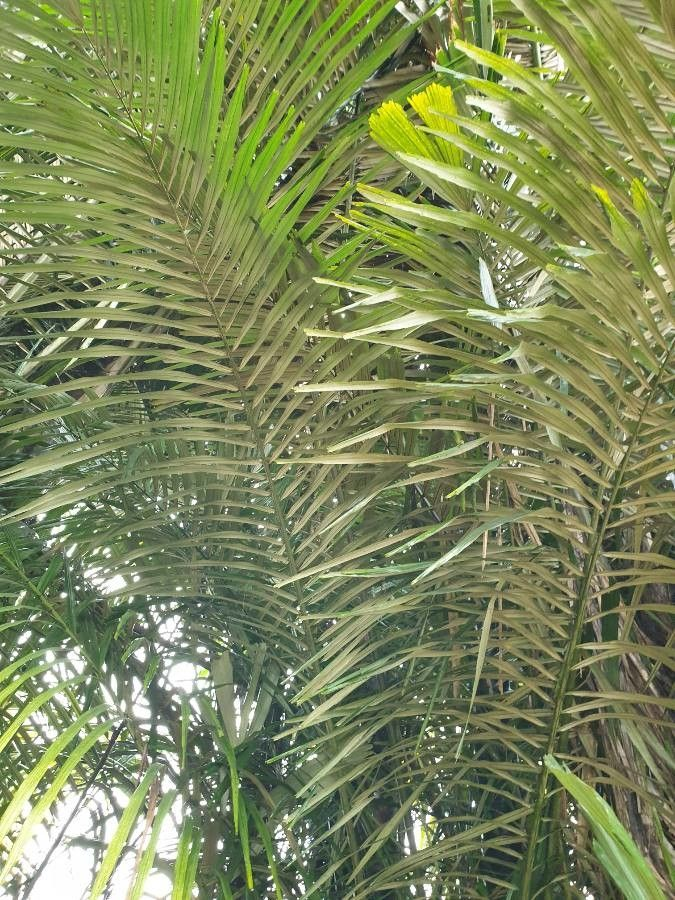

Conservation status
- Least Concern (IUCN 3.1)

Scientific classification
- Kingdom: Plantae
- Clade: Tracheophytes
- Clade: Angiosperms
- Clade: Monocots
- Clade: Commelinids
- Order: Arecales
- Family: Arecaceae
- Genus: Arenga
- Species: A. obtusifolia

Binomial name
- Arenga obtusifolia Mart.

= Arenga obtusifolia =

Species of palm

Arenga obtusifolia is a flowering plant in the palm family Arecaceae native to Thailand, Malaysia, Borneo and Java. It is unusual among palms in that it forms rhizomes up to 9 m (30 ft) in length, forming clonal colonies.
