= Periya, Wayanad =

- Village
- Location in Kerala, India
- Coordinates: 11°50′00″N 75°51′20″E
- Country: India
- State: Kerala
- District: Wayanad

Population (2011)
  - Total: 12,669

Languages
  - Official: Malayalam, English
- Time zone: UTC+5:30 (IST)
- Postal code: 670644
- Vehicle registration: KL-72

Periya is a village located in Wayanad district in Kerala, India. Periya Surrounded by Western Ghats forests, it features lush green tea and coffee estates. The area is rich in biodiversity, offering excellent opportunities for birdwatching and spotting butterflies.
