= Lampung Bay =

- Teluk Lampung (Indonesian)
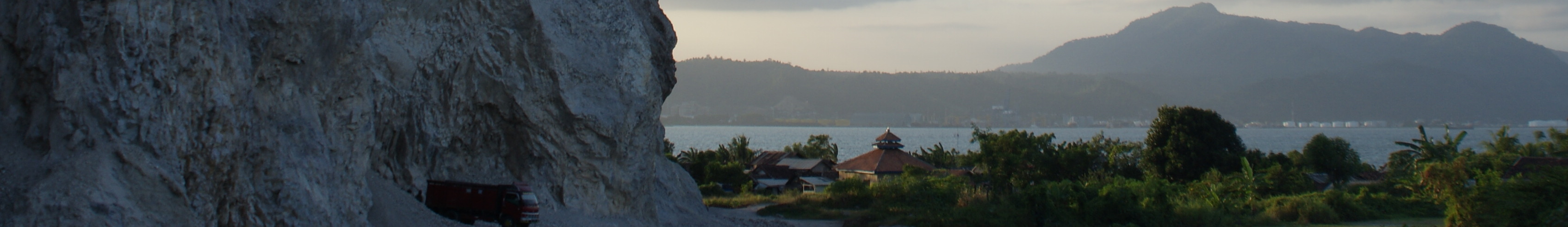
- Mount Kunyit and Lampung Bay, Bandar Lampung, Indonesia

- Location within Sumatra
- Location: Southeast Asia
- Coordinates: 5°40′00″S 105°20′00″E
- Type: Bay
- Primary outflows: Sunda Strait
- Basin countries: Indonesia
- References: Teluk Lampung: Indonesia National Geospatial-Intelligence Agency, Bethesda, MD, USA

Lampung Bay (Indonesian: Teluk Lampung) is a large bay located on the southern tip of Sumatra Island in the Sunda Strait waters. At the southern tip of Sumatra there are two large bays, Semangka Bay is located in the Eastern part.

On the east side of the bay stretches Lampung, with the capital city of Lampung located at the northern end of the bay. Two rivers that discharge into the Bay divide Bandar Lampung City. Lampung bay is located between Bandar Lampung City, South Lampung Regency and Pesawaran Regency. Panjang Port is also located in this bay.

The Bay of Lampung, which covers an area of 1,888 square km, is a shallow water area with an average depth of 20 meters.

The Bay contains a significant Mangrove ecosystem that would be a good candidate for mangrove restoration. A 2020 survey of stakeholders in the bay, including artisanal fishers, shrimp fishers and other fishery communities found that the communities preferred restoration processes focused on mangrove tourism.

== Islands in Lampung Bay ==
- Pasaran Island
- Sebesi Island
- Sebuku Island
- Legundi Island
- Kelagian Island
- Condong Laut Island
- Tangkil Island
- Tegal Mas Island
- other small islands
