= HNLMS De Ruyter (1880) =

Atjeh-class unprotected cruiser

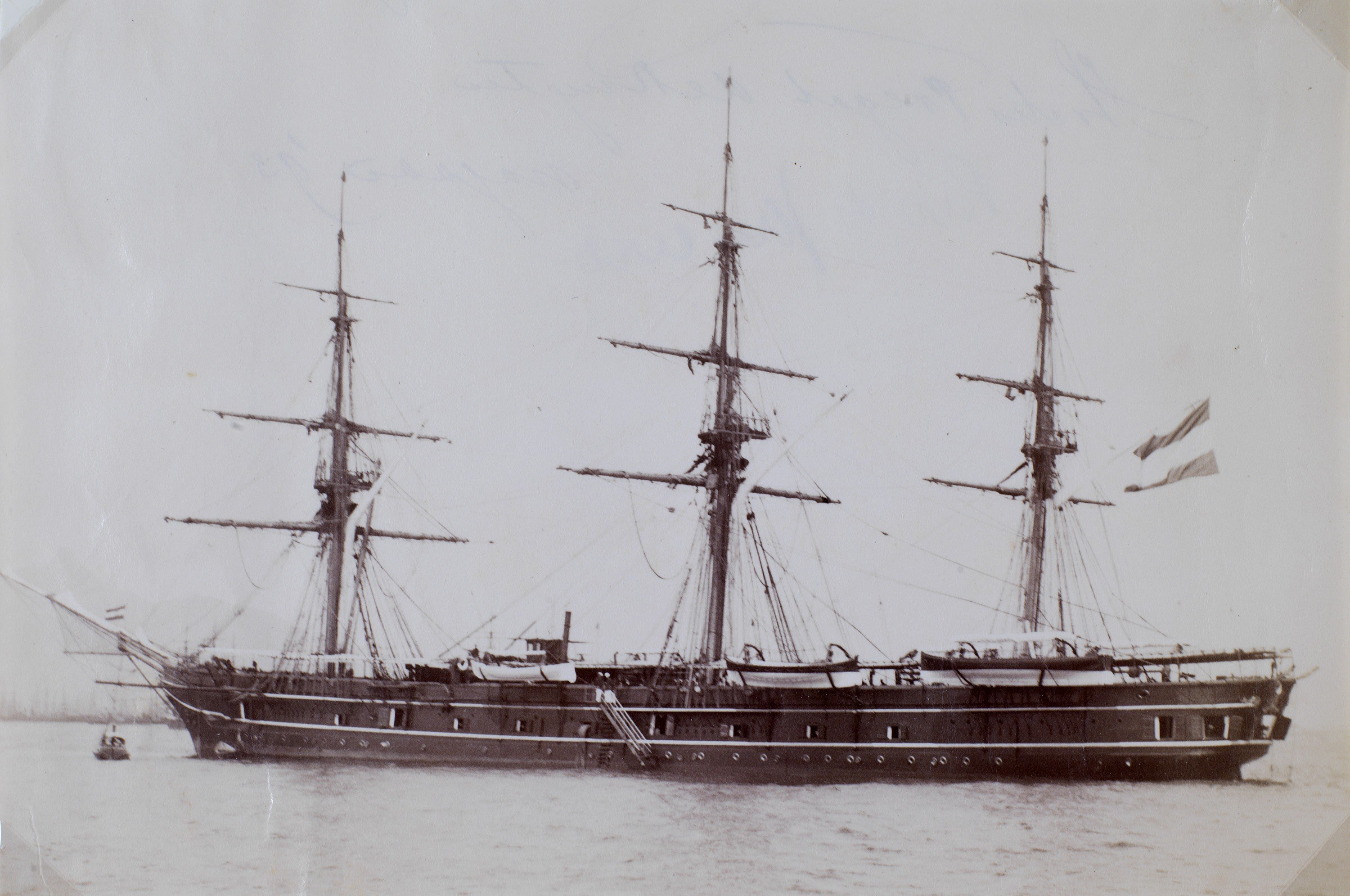
- De Ruyter in Rio de Janeiro in November 1893

History

Netherlands
- Name: De Ruyter
- Namesake: Michiel de Ruyter
- Builder: Rijkswerf, Amsterdam
- Laid down: 7 January 1879
- Launched: 22 September 1880
- Sponsored by: Elisabeth Princess of Romania
- Commissioned: 1 August 1885
- Decommissioned: 27 May 1899
- Stricken: Sold 29 May 1900

General characteristics (as completed)
- Class & type: Atjeh-class
- Displacement: 3,160 tons
- Length: 93.05 m (305 ft 3 in) (overall); 80.00 m (262 ft 6 in) (p/p)
- Beam: 12.497 m (41 ft 0 in)
- Draft: 6.706 m (22 ft 0 in)
- Installed power: Compound steam engine; nominal 370 kW (500 hp); effective 2,200 kW (3,000 ihp)
- Speed: 14 knots (26 km/h)
- Complement: 225
- Armament: 6 × 6.7 in (17 cm) (6 × 1); 8 × 4.7 in (12 cm) (8 × 1)
- Armour: engine behind coal bunkers

HNLMS De Ruyter (Dutch: Zr.Ms/Hr.Ms. De Ruyter), was an Atjeh-class unprotected cruiser built in Amsterdam for the Royal Netherlands Navy in the 1879–1880.

== Ordering and construction ==
=== Ordering ===
By building the Atjeh-class cruisers, the Dutch Navy had opted for a large iron cruiser to replace the steam corvettes which defended the Dutch East Indies. The Atjeh class brought many innovations, like an iron hull, much larger size, rigging, breechloaders below deck etc. De Ruyter would be the fourth ship of this class. In November 1877 the minister for the navy announced that he would postpone the construction of De Ruyter till Atjeh had been proven to be successful. In the budget this was implemented by shifting 10% of the cost of one ship, from the fourth ship to the completion of the third ship.

In 1878 Atjeh started her trials. First came the speed trials, and experiments with the type of propeller. Next came experiments with using the steam engines at very low, or even zero pressure, which continued in May 1878. These were important for deciding on the type of steam engine to use for De Ruyter. In June and July trials under sail followed. After all these trials proved very successful, Atjeh was commissioned in mid August 1878. In September 1878, the budget for 1879 then indeed showed allocation for building the fourth ship of the Atjeh class.

=== Construction ===
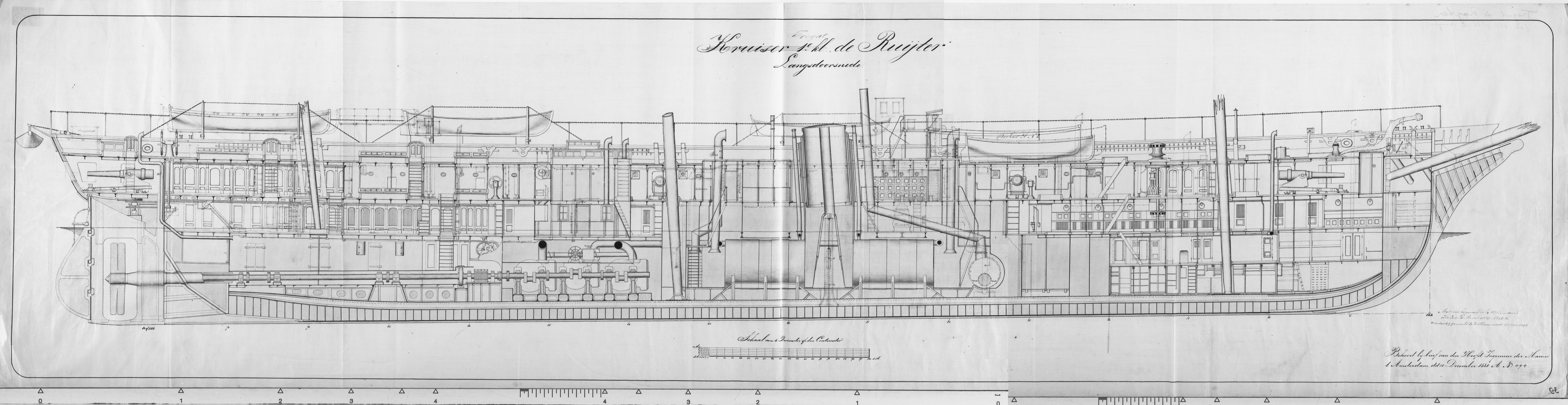
De Ruyter design drawing

De Ruyter was laid down at Rijkswerf Amsterdam on 7 January 1879. On that day, King William III of the Netherlands married Emma of Waldeck and Pyrmont. At that moment, the cruiser Koningin Emma, which was up to then named De Ruyter, was almost ready to be launched. On account of the marriage, De Ruyter was then renamed Koningin Emma der Nederlanden, and a new De Ruyter was laid down on the same day.

In mid September 1880 Elisabeth of Wied, Princess of Romania (not yet a kingdom in 1880), and Princess Marie of Nassau, Princess-Widow von Wied arrived in Amsterdam. They were later joined by Queen Sophia of Sweden. On 21 September Elisabeth, Marie and the Consul of Sweden visited the Rijkswerf Amsterdam, and the training ship Wassenaar. On 22 September 1880 De Ruyter was launched. The launch was attended by the two princesses and the Dutch minister of the navy. The Princess of Romania would become the ship's sponsor. With a small axe she cut a rope, launching the ship.

On 30 May 1881 the Lieutenants 2nd class B. Brutel de la Rivière and W.J. Cohen Stuart left the guardship at Willemsoord with 50 NCO's and sailors. Their mission was to bring De Ruyter to Willemsoord under command of Jonkheer J.C.L. von Schmidt auf Altenstadt. On 31 May De Ruyter and Stier left IJmuiden for Nieuwediep, where they arrived the same day.

=== Trials ===
The steam engines of De Ruyter were made by Fijenoord. They were of a three-cylinder compound type, with two low-pressure cylinders and one high-pressure cylinder. The first trial of the machine took place with the ship moored near the Rijkswerf Amsterdam. De Ruyter then steamed to Willemsoord for more extensive trials. On 13 July 1881 the first sea trial took place. While steaming for four hours at 1,856 ihp, coal consumption was 0.74 kg/ihp/h and speed was 13.2 kn. This was well within the required 0.9 kg/ihp/h at 1,750-2,200 ihp. An operating mistake then caused that the full speed trial had to be postponed due to some repairs.

On 27 July 1881 the full-speed trial took place. During four hours, De Ruyter made 14.5 knots at 86.3 turns and with well over 3,000 ihp. During 1.5 hours, she even made 14.86 knots at 88 turns. On 28 July a trial at moderate speed took place. With two boilers and steaming at about 9 knots, coal consumption was 235 kg per geographical mile. With a coal storage of 226 ton, this would give a projected range of 900 miles, well over the specified 600 miles at 8 knots. The final trials on 27 and 28 July were attended by inspectors F.W. Hudig and J.K. Beucker Andreae. As a direct result, the same engines were ordered for Van Speyk.

=== In Ordinary ===
After the trials, De Ruyter still required some work. On 9 August 1881 she arrived back in IJmuiden, from whence she continued to the Rijkswerf Amsterdam in order to be finished. On 18 October 1881 De Ruyter left Rijkswerf Amsterdam again, towed by two tugboats. She was commanded by Lieutenant 1st class J.C.L. von Schmidt auf Altenstadt. The ship without sails would be towed to IJmuiden. On the same day, she left IJmuiden again. She was escorted to Nieuwediep by Buffel. Both arrived in Nieuwediep at midnight. At Willemsoord, De Ruyter was placed in ordinary.

== First service in the Dutch East Indies ==
=== Voyage to the Dutch East Indies ===
In early 1885 plans to commission De Ruyter for a trip to the Dutch East Indies became known. In mid-July 1885 Captain Jonkheer T.E. de Brauw was appointed to take command of De Ruyter on 1 August. In June she had already run a trial, during which she made 14 knots. On 4 July 1885 she ran another trial. Another trial followed on 10 July, when she made 13.3 kn at 5.49 m average draft. On 27 August a very short trial was held, in which she steamed 13.75 kn at an average draft of 5.88 m, which was not a typical trial run. The plan was to use steam continuously in order to reach the Dutch East Indies in the shortest possible time, the navy hoped for 35 days. De Ruyter was equipped with 316 men, 13 weeks of provisions, 22,000 liters of water, and 366 tons of coal. Draft was 5.62 m fore and 6.76 m aft.

On 1 September 1885 De Ruyter left Nieuwdiep, and anchored in the Texel roadstead. On 2 September she was inspected by the commander of Willemsoord, lifted anchor and steamed into the North Sea. With four boilers in use, the machine made 60 strokes, and with an east-southeast wind of 6 Beaufort, the sails were also put to use, resulting in a speed of 10-11 knots. In the morning of 3 September De Ruyter entered the English Channel against a strong southwest wind. Near St Catherine's Point (Isle of Wight), the machines broke down. De Ruyter then sailed at 3.5-4.75 kn for about 8 hours. After the machines were repaired, the lighthouse of Ushant was seen in the evening of 4 September. As expected, performance of the ship proved a lot worse in reality than during trials. With a strong wind from the southwest, and strong swell, speed was 1-2 knots slower, and coal consumption double that of the trials. However, the inexperience and sea sickness of the young stokers also played its part. On the 7th, the wind turned, and so the ship could also use the square and other sails, which increased speed to 11 knots. On 8 September De Ruyter passed Cape St. Vincent and signaled the semaphore that she would visit Malta, because she had not enough coal to reach Port Said. New machine trouble then again forced her captain to shut down the machines, but luckily a 5 bft. northern wind allowed her to continue under sail at 6 knots. On 9 September she passed Gibraltar. On a very calm sea with almost no wind, coal consumption continued to be way too high, because many pipes were leaking. Indeed, in some of the boilers, all pipes leaked, and De Ruyter only just reached Malta on the 13th. The report that the captain sent from Malta was very enthusiastic about all aspects of the ship, except about the machines.

On Malta De Ruyter bunkered, and repaired multiple types of tubes and two auxiliary machines. The cost would be 21.3.3 GBP. The captain noted that all English commanders asked whether De Ruyter really did not have electrical lighting, a search light, torpedo boat and whitehead torpedoes. After repairs and taking in supplies, e.g. 126,000 liters of fresh water, draft was 5.1 m and 6.5 m aft. De Ruyter left Malta on 18 September. Attempt to make 70 turns immediately led to parts of the machinery overheating, and so this could not be done. On 22 September De Ruyter reached Port Said.

On the 25th, De Ruyter left Suez. The north and north east winds increased speed to 10-10.5 knots, and the machines worked well at 60 strokes. On the 26th the square sails were raised, the machines increased to 66 strokes, and the speed increased to 11-11.25 kn. She reached Aden on 1 October.

After leaving Aden, De Ruyter tried to steam slower, and to make more use of the sails in order to save coal, but this had little effect on coal consumption. On 5 October the steam engines were stopped again. Some mechanical defects were found, and again, many tubes were found to be leaking. After some repairs and cleaning, it was found that 10 more strokes (55 instead 45) could be made with the same coal consumption. After many more problems with the engines, De Ruyter reached Galle on Sri Lanka on 13 October.

In Galle, De Ruyter was visited by Gustav Semsey de Semse, commander of the Austrian corvette SMS Frundsberg. De Ruyter left Galle on 14 October. On the 15th the machine broke down completely, and so the ship continued under sail while repairs were ongoing. Under sail she reached 4-4.5 kn, but on the 16th this descreased to 2-2.5 kn. On the 19th the engine broke down again, with the same part, the high-pressure stoomschuifstang breaking. While the last reserve high-pressure stoomschuifstang was put in place, De Ruyter drifted in a windless area. On the 21st the machines were operational again. The captain now decided to continue to Batavia with 50 strokes maximum. Nevertheless, on the 24th the last high-pressure stoomschuifstang broke. Now De Ruyter had to work against a strong wind, using only the two low pressure cylinders. With these and four boilers, the machine could only make 45-48 strokes at 5,500-6,000 kg coal consumption / four hours. On the 25th the distance to Batavia was still 88 miles, and coal storage 90 tons. De Ruyter arrived in Batavia at 1 o'clock on 27 October.

=== In the Dutch East Indies ===
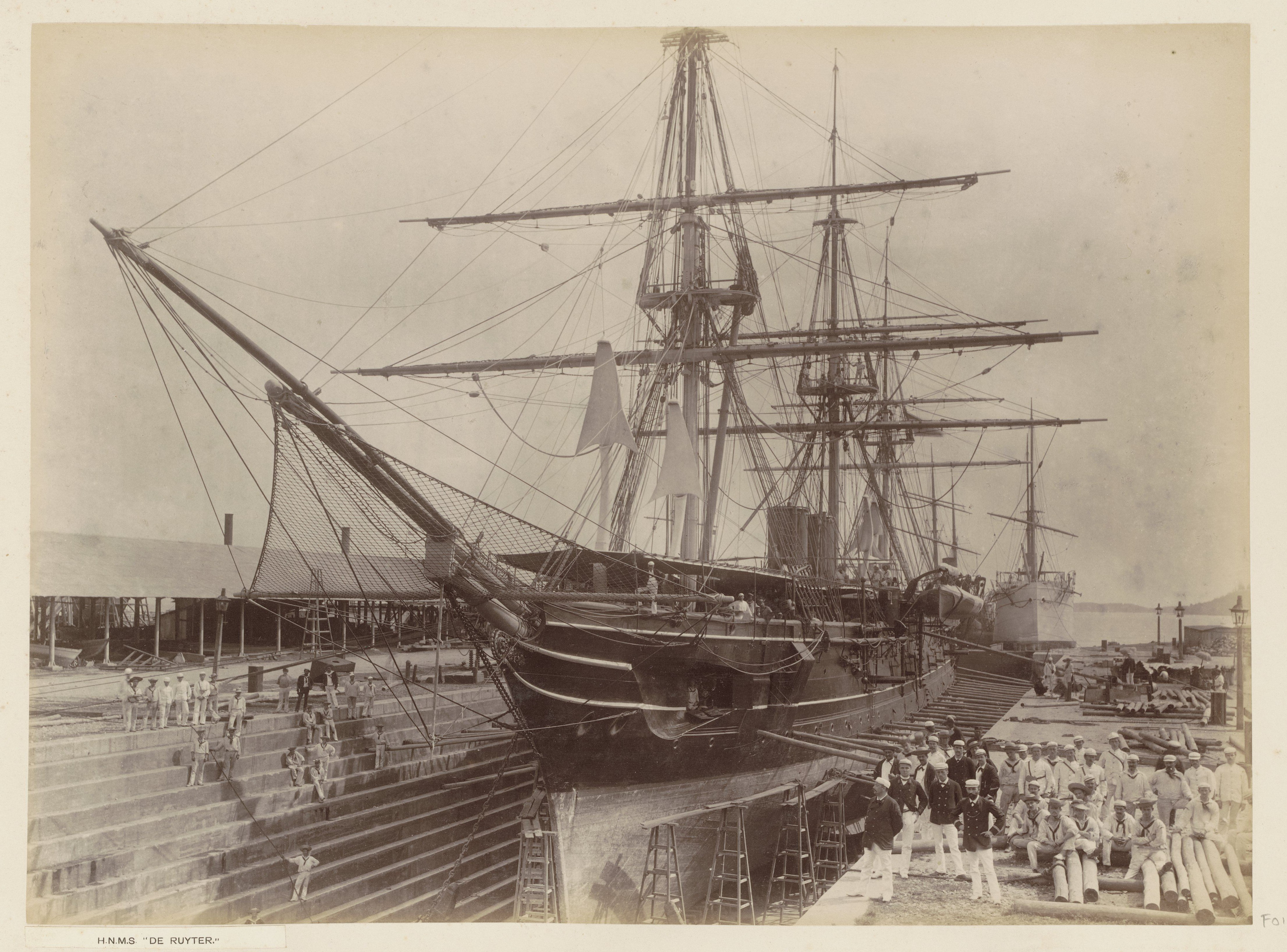
HNLMS de Ruyter in dry dock in Singapore.

After arrival in Batavia on 27 October 1885, De Ruyter was inspected by the Naval commander of the Dutch East Indies on 3 November. She then continued to Onrust Island to bunker some coal at Cipir (Kuiper) Island. On 5 November she left for Surabaya, where she arrived on the 9th. The repair facilities and harbor of Surabaya were very busy, and therefore repairs were made while De Ruyter anchored in the roadstead. Repairs were so substantial that she was out of service till 16 June 1886. On that day she made a trial run for several days to get a smooth operation of the parts of the high-pressure cylinder. After that, she anchored in Semarang on 22 June. Here, the Naval commander of the Dutch East Indies embarked again on the 27th, and inspected the ship en route. De Ruyter reached Batavia on 29 June.

After bunkering coal, and some gunnery exercises, De Ruyter still required some maintenance below the water line. Normally this would have been done on Onrust Dock of 5,000 tons, but this was in repair in Surabaya from May 1886 till May 1887. De Ruyter therefore left for Singapore to have her zinc outer hull cleaned and painted. This job would take only two days, but she remained in Singapore from 12 to 24 July 1886, because of trouble in Atjeh. On receipt of a telegram from Batavia she sailed back again, arriving there on 27 July. She was then held ready in the Port of Tanjung Priok.

On 6 August 1886 De Ruyter left for Atjeh. En route she visited Penang, where the 100th anniversary of the state was being celebrated. On 14 August she reached Ulèë Lheuë (Port of Banda Aceh, known in Dutch as Oleh-Leh). Next De Ruyter cruised the coast to intimidate the locals, and to collect fines. Part of this included a landing on shore. On 23 September 1886 she was back at Ulèë Lheuë. Meanwhile, troubles with high-pressure cylinder parts were still not solved completely. De Ruyter continued at Ulèë Lheuë till 18 October. While there, she was part of a punishment expedition against a part of Aceh known as 'VI Moekims', together with Macassar and Merapi.

On 18 October 1886 De Ruyter then left for Padang, which was reached on the 21st. On the 29th she then continued to Goenong Sitolie, which was reached on the 30th. Next De Ruyter, and the Valk with the governor of Padang on board, visited Goenong Limboe, Telok Dalem, the bay of Lagoendie, the Nako isles and Lapouw. On 9 November De Ruyter continued alone from Lapouw to Singkil, and on the 11th she continued to Trumon, but due to a cholera outbreak over there, she returned immediately to Singkil. From 19 till 29 November De Ruyter was anchored before Padang.

On the 29 November 1886 De Ruyter made a trip to the Mentawai Islands. The goal was to strengthen Dutch authority in the area. Part of this was to intimidate the population, so it would refrain from killing passing merchants and sailors. Part of it involved landings on Siberut Island, and going upriver with boats. On 14 December De Ruyter left Siberut. She arrived back in Padang on 15 December 1886.

On 22 December 1886 De Ruyter continued to Bengkulu, where she arrived the next day. On 28 December she visited Enggano Island with the governor of Bengkulu on board. After returning him to Bengkulu, she continued to Telukbetung. On 30 December the main place of Lampung province was reached. The resident found it necessary to show the flag in Semangka Bay, which was visited on 3 January 1887. On 5 January 1887 gunnery exercises were held near Pulau Tegal.

On 8 January 1887 De Ruyter anchored near Onrust Island to make some repairs to the machinery. On 14 February Captain-Lt P. Zegers Veeckens to temporary command of De Ruyter. After trials and gunnery exercises she arrived in Tanjung Priok on 23 April. On 28 April De Ruyter steamed out of Tanjung Priok to exercise in Sunda Strait and further west. From 11 May till 3 June, she was again in Tanjung Priok. On 1 June Captain K.A. Stakman Bosse took command. On 3 June she then left for Surabaya together with Tromp to get docked. On 10 July she was back in Batavia, and later that month she visited Cilacap. In September De Ruyter left Batavia to visit Semarang 12–17 September, Banyuwangi 23–24 September, and Cilacap again 1–6 October. She then went back to Batavia.

On 14 November 1887 Van Speyk, De Ruyter and Ceram left Batavia for Buleleng on Bali, where they were joined by Madura and Pontianak. On 20 November this squadron sailed to Ampenan on Lombok with the Resident of Bali and Lombok on board. The show of force led to an agreement about the opium trade and the treatment of Europeans. On 14 December the squadron then went to Ujung Bay to hold talks with the lords of Karangasem. After the squadron was disbanded at Buleleng, De Ruyter arrived back in Batavia on 22 December.

On 12 February 1888 De Ruyter went to the Chinese Sea via Riau. The goal was to show the flag at the Tambelan, Natuna and Anambas island groups in that sea. On 3 March De Ruyter went to Singapore and docked over there. On 19 March she was back at Onrust, where some painting and other maintenance was done. On 31 March she arrived in Tanjung Priok.

On 21 June 1888 De Ruyter left for Padang. She again visited the Mentawai Islands, amongst them Sipura Island, with an eye to making a settlement there. On 14 July she was back at Padang after alarming news had been received from Trumon. On 17 July she steamed to Trumon with the governor of Sumatra's west coast on board. On 20 July she arrived there, and on 23 July at Seuleukat. Here a Trumon fortress would have been captured by troops from Aceh, but troops that were landed by De Ruyter found everything deserted. She went back to Padang, and later to Sipura. After trigonometrical and hydrographical measurements were complete, she was back at Padang on 1 September. On 17 September she left to visit Siberut, and the Pagai (Nassau) islands, before turning to Batavia, where she arrived on the 25th.

On 29 October 1888 De Ruyter left Tanjung Priok with the guard ship Gedeh in tow. On 4 November both arrived in Surabaya. On 10 November Captain J. Loots took command. After repairs and docking, a trial was held on 1 January 1889. On 4 January 1889 De Ruyter was back in Tanjung Priok. After bunkering at Kuiper Island, she left Batavia on 25 February, and returned on 16 March.

=== To New Guinea and Australia ===
On 16 April 1889 De Ruyter left Batavia for a trip to the east. She was to visit British New Guinea and German New Guinea. On 16 April she reached Timor, where she bunkered, and on 29 April Port Darwin. After repairs she set forth again on 11 May. Because of heavy headwinds, she reached Torres Strait by using steam power. On 18 May she anchored at Port Kennedy, Thursday Island. On 22 May she continued to Townsville, Queensland, reaching Cleveland Bay on 27 May. On 5 June De Ruyter left Townsville again, and set sail for Port Moresby, which was reached on 10 June.

On 15 June 1889 De Ruyter left Port Moresby, and sailed east. Near Cape Sud-Est she hit a reef and was stuck for four hours. On 21 June De Ruyter reached Finschhafen, where the captain met Landeshauptman Dr. Krautke. On 4 July the ship left for Vitiaz Strait, reaching Dorèh on the 9th, where 90 tons of additional coal were loaded. On 15 July she set course for Ternate on the Maluku Islands, which was reached on the 18th. On 17 August, De Ruyter left Ternate for lengthy visits to Ambon Island and Banda. On 10 September 1889 De Ruyter was in Makassar, South Sulawesi, from whence she left for Batavia on the 24th.

=== Back to the Netherlands ===
On 3 October 1889 De Ruyter arrived in Batavia. Here she was inspected by the Naval Commander of the Dutch East Indies. After bunkering on Kuiper Island, she left for Surabaya on the 30th, arriving there on 3 November. In Surabaya the necessary repairs for the return trip to the Netherlands were made. These lasted till January 1890. From 24 December till 9 February, she was commanded by Captain-Lt J.J. Stooker. He was succeeded by Captain J.P. Mercier. After returning to Priok, De Ruyter left for the Netherlands on 16 February. While bunkering on Kuiper Island, this order was countermanded, and so she remained near Kuiper Island till 11 March. She then went to Padang, and only started the voyage to the Netherlands via the Cape on 24 April 1890.

On 24 April 1890 De Ruyter, commanded by Captain J.P. Mercier, set course from Padang to South Africa after receiving a telegram. She had a crew of 308 men, 17 weeks of provisions, 309 tons of coal, and a draft of 5.65 m fore and 6.75 m aft. The last docking had been on 19 December 1889. Instructions were not to visit any harbor except at the Cape. On the stretch to South Africa, De Ruyter really had to make effective use of her sails to reach Simon's Town on 11 June. In Simon's Town bunkering 370 tons of coal was done by hand, using barges. On 19 June the voyage was continued. After using steam to get to sea, De Ruyter reached the equator using only her sails. By making only sparse use of the machines, she arrived in Falmouth on 1 September. On 5 September 1890 she was back at Willemsoord.

== Service in the West Indies ==
On 25 March 1891, De Ruyter was ready for action after repairs to the hull, boilers and machinery at Willemsoord. The gun ports were also changed. On 20 March De Ruyter left Texel, commanded by Captain W. Baron van Hogendorp. On 21 March she reached Vlissingen, where she moored in the Binnenhaven, behind the sea lock. On 25 March she left Vlissingen. De Ruyter tried to make the most use of her sails, but finally had to use her engines in order not to hit the Portuguese coast. The rest of the trip De Ruyter did not sail fast, but her captain was satisfied. He noted that close-hauled in light winds, she always kept some speed, while with more wind, she was a good sailer. On 30 April she arrived before the Suriname River. On 3 May 1891 De Ruyter left Suriname, and set course for Curaçao. On 9 May 1891 she arrived there, and anchored next to Johan Willem Friso.

On 1 October 1891 De Ruyter was at Aruba. On the 10th she was back in Curaçao. On 9 November De Ruyter started a trip to the Leeward Islands. On the 13th she arrived at Charlotte Amalie on Danish Saint Thomas. Here the ship met USS Philadelphia and USS Kearsarge, the former of which was visited. On 18 November De Ruyter arrived in Saint Martin. Here rifle and gunnery exercises were held. On the 24th the ship left for Sint Eustatius, where she arrived the same day. On the 26th she sailed for Saba, which she reached and left the same day. She next reached a position near Dominica on sail only on the 28th; from there she reached Martinique the same day. Just as she was leaving on December 1, the French cruiser Magon entered port. De Ruyter next visited Saint Lucia. On 8 December she reached Grenada after a 24-hour sailing trip. On 12 December she arrived at Trinidad. Here she met SMS Moltke and the Austrian Aurora. On 20 December De Ruyter set course for Curaçao, which was reached on 24 December.

On 13 January 1892 Captain D.G. Brand arrived at Curaçao on board the steamer Prins Willem II of the Koninklijke West-Indischen Maildienst. On the 14th he took command of De Ruyter. On 30 January De Ruyter sailed to Martinique in order to dock there. Here she met the French cruiser Naïade, the Magon and Hussard. On 3 February De Ruyter entered the dry dock, which she left on the 8th. On the 11th she set course to Saint Kitts. On 14 February she anchored at Dominica, which was visited. On 17 February Saint Kitts was reached. Here the Governor of the Dutch West Indies came on board. On the 19th De Ruyter then left for Saint Martin which was reached the same day. It was a big show suggesting that the governor arrived on a ship worthy of his rank, while in reality he had used a packet for 99% of the way. The many salutes each time the governor left the ship were part of this. On the 23rd the governor embarked again, and Sint Eustatius was visited. On the 25th the ship was back at Saint Martin. On 28 February De Ruyter steamed from Saint Martin to Saint Thomas, where the governor disembarked to take the mail ship to Curaçao. De Ruyter left for Curaçao on 1 March. She anchored at Willemstad on 4 March.

De Ruyter remained at Willemstad till 3 May 1892. While there Johan Willem Friso visited, and exchanged part of her crew. From 3 till 7 May a short trip was made. On 30 June she then sailed to Santo Domingo, using steam for 14 hours of the 56 hour trip. From 2 to 4 July she remained at anchor. She then continued to St. Thomas and St. Martin. On 5 July the birthday of Princess Marie of the Netherlands was celebrated as usual. Political developments in Venezuela then held back De Ruyter at St. Thomas. On 14 July she was back at Saint Martin. On the 15th Sint Eustatius was visited. On 18 July Saint Vincent was visited. Here De Ruyter held gunnery exercises for three days. On 25 July De Ruyter was back at Curaçao.

On 1 September 1892 De Ruyter set sail to La Guaira, the main port of Venezuela, which was reached the next day. The French cruiser Magon, the German ship Arcona and the Spanish sloop Jorge Juan were already present. All commanders then came on board De Ruyter to coordinate their actions. On 5 September the English screw corvette Canada arrived. On 7 September screw corvette Pylades arrived. On 10 September the gunboat USS Concord arrived, and on the 16th the USS Kearsarge. The whole affair ended quietly, with De Ruyter leaving on the 16th. She then remained in Curaçao till 1 October.

On 24 October 1892 De Ruyter left for Aruba, where she held gunnery practice. She returned on the 27th. On 22 November De Ruyter started a new exercise cruise to Saint Martin and Sint Eustatius. Most of the voyage had to be done steaming. Therefore, because the ship was burning coal anyway, exercises with quick-firing and revolver guns were held en route. In the afternoon of 25 November 1892 De Ruyter anchored before Philipsburg, Sint Maarten. On the 29th De Ruyter visited Sint Eustatius. In the night of 29–30 November the ship set course for Guadeloupe, where she arrived on the 30th. After a lot of civilities, De Ruyter left again on 3 December. On 5 December she arrived at Port of Spain, Trinidad. De Ruyter left again on 10 December, and arrived back in Curaçao on 12 December.

On 27 December 1892 De Ruyter set sail again. With not much wind, she sailed at only 2.5 knots. On 30 December wind increased to 7 bft, and then weakened again while Haiti came in sight on the 31st. Here De Ruyter passed Gonâve Island and her arrival was announced. Next came a visit to Port-au-Prince, from whence she left on 5 January 1893. On 7 January she passed Isla Alto Velo, and on 8 January she anchored before Santo Domingo. From there she arrived back in Curaçao on 12 January.

On 8 February 1893 the sloop Alkmaar, Captain-lt J.A. Krabbe, arrived in Curaçao. On 15 February De Ruyter, Captain D.G. Brand, then left for the Netherlands. On the 18th she reached Fort-de-France on Martinique. On the 20th she visited the dry dock, which she left the 22nd. Construction of a new axle for the anchor winch then delayed departure till the 25th, long enough to see the arrival of the gunvessel Suriname. As expected, the way home led close past the Grand Banks of Newfoundland on 15 March. On 26 March the ship passed the Isle of Wight, and on the 27 March De Ruyter anchored in the Texel roadstead.

== To Brazil, the East Indies and back (1893-1894) ==
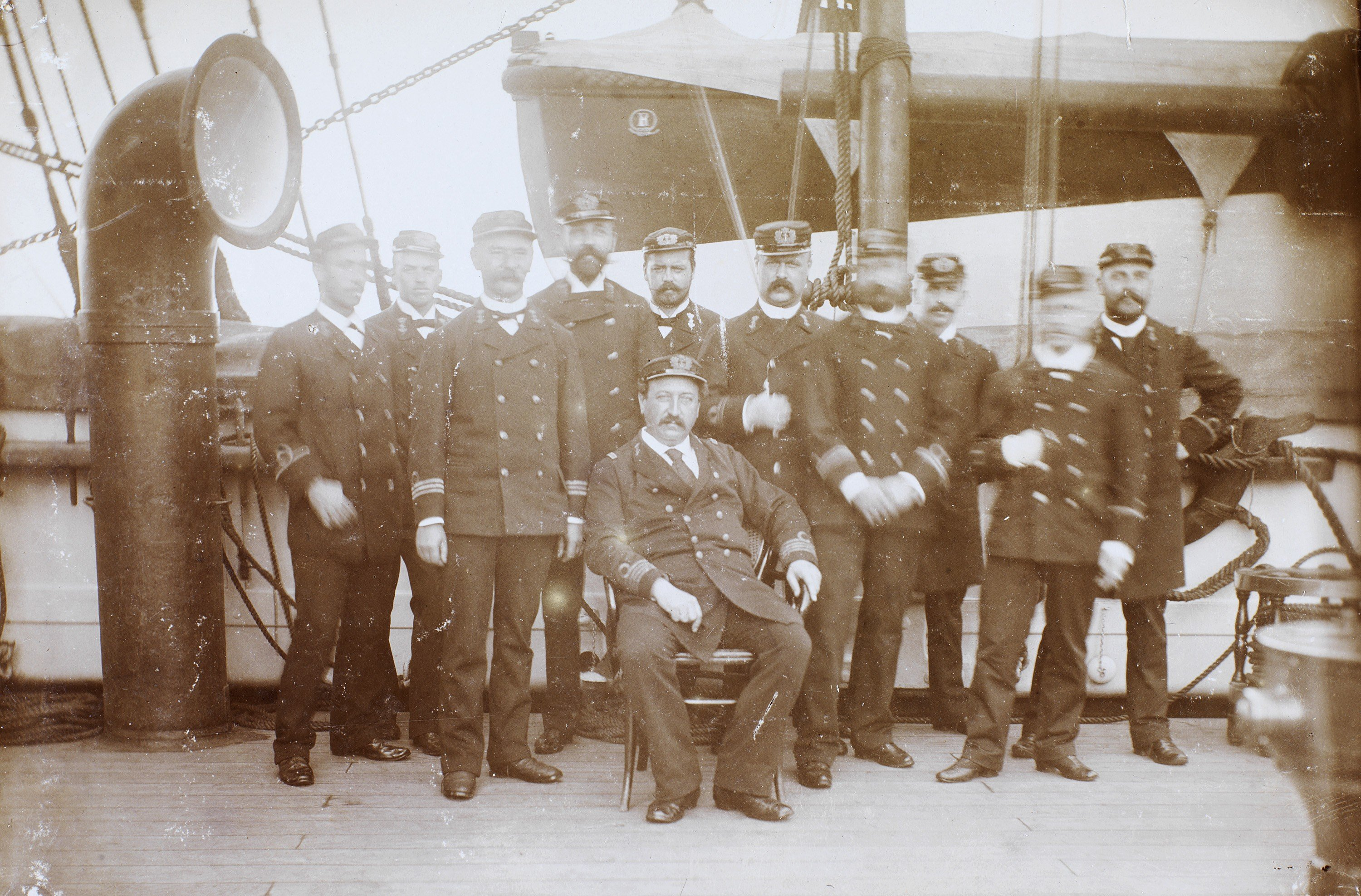
Officers during the 1893 trip to the Dutch East Indies

On 1 October 1893 De Ruyter captain C. Hoffman left Nieuwediep for the Dutch East Indies via Rio de Janeiro. She had 315 men and 15 weeks of provisions. On 15 October she passed the Tropic of Cancer. On 18 October she reached Saint Vincent in the Antilles. On 19 October De Ruyter continued to Brazil. On 27 October De Ruyter passed the equator. On 5 November she coursed to Cabo Frio. On 7 November De Ruyter arrived in Rio, where she arrived in the middle of the Revolta da Armada (1893-1894). De Ruyter remained in Rio for a long time. The captain would send a thorough report about the fighting in the bay. On 8 December 1893 De Ruyter left Rio de Janeiro. On 10 January 1894 she passed Cape Horn, and observed many icebergs. On 13 February she passed the Tropic of Capricorn. On 22 February she anchored in Tanjong Priok, Batavia.

After repairs, De Ruyter left Surabaya on 19 March 1894. After bunkering, she continued to the east on 21 March. On the 22nd she passed Bali. On 21 April she was near Cape Sainte Marie, Madagascar. On 6 May De Ruyter anchored before Cape Town. On 15 May De Ruyter left Cape Town. On 3 June Ascension Island was sighted. Meanwhile De Ruyter was again plagued by leaking tubes. On 14 July Lizard Point, Cornwall, was sighted. On 17 July De Ruyter anchored at Texel. On 24 July 1894 De Ruyter entered the dry dock in Willemsoord. On 1 October 1894 she was decommissioned.

== Second East Indies service ==
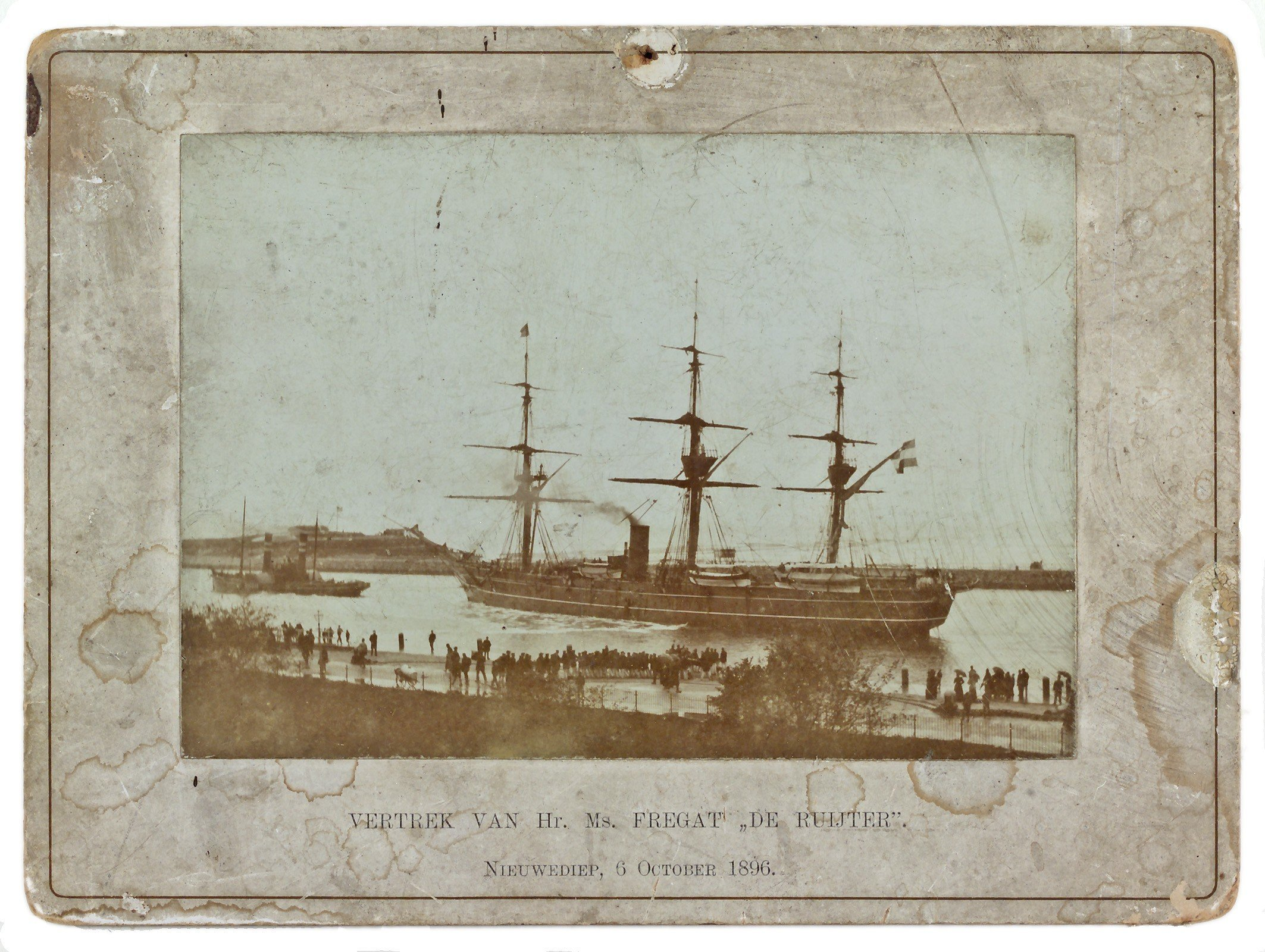
HNLMS. De Ruyter (1885-1899) leaving Nieuwediep in October 1896

On Friday 2 November 1894 De Ruyter again entered a dry dock in Willemsoord. After important repairs, De Ruyter ran a new trial near Texel on 7 August 1895, making 12 knots. She was planned to sail to the East Indies again, but this plan was abandoned in November 1895.

On 1 September 1896 De Ruyter was commissioned again under Captain H.O. Feith. On 6 October De Ruyter left Nieuwediep and steamed to the Texel Roadstead to correct the compasses. The original plan was to continue the same day, but a strong SSW wind and strongly decreasing barometric pressure prompted the captain to delay departure. On 7 October De Ruyter then left Nieuwediep for Vlissingen, which was reached at midnight. On the 8th she entered the dock, and in the night of 9–10 October she sailed for the East Indies. The trip came to an almost immediate end when she had to anchor because of fog. In daylight she continued her trip, but fog and drizzle prompted the captain to keep the pilot on board till Dungeness. She sailed when it was possible, and steamed otherwise. On the 15th she reached Madeira. On 26 October she reached Porto Grande Bay on São Vicente, Cape Verde, with 100 tons of coal left. After mutual visits with the Portuguese authorities, De Ruyter left again on 30 October 1896. On 17 November she passed the Tropic of Capricorn.

On 25 November 1896 the pilot for Buenos Aires came on board. De Ruyter anchored before the city, but after some doubts about the harbor, she continued to the harbor of La Plata, where she attached to the quay. On 4 December De Ruyter got a telegram to remain in Buenos Aires till the arrival of Van Speyk. This telegram had to do with a rebellion in Uruguay. On 11 December Van Speyk arrived. On 12 December De Ruyter then sailed from before La Plata. On 29 December she passed the prime meridian, at 42.20 S. The crew continuously measured water and air temperature in order to determine the chance for icebergs. On 9 January these were indeed sighted, one of them 21 m high. On 7 February 1897 De Ruyter entered the Emmahaven of Padang. After bunkering, she left again on the 16th, and arrived in Tanjong Priok, Batavia, on 19 February 1897.

On 1 March 1897 Captain W.M.J. Visser took over command. On 8 March 1897 De Rutyer then left Batavia for Ampenan, Lombok. On 27 March she continued to Makassar, where she arrived 31 March. On 18 June she started a trip to the Lesser Sunda Islands. On the 19th Sumbawa island was visited. On the 22nd she anchored before the coal storage in Bima. On the 25th gunnery exercises were held in Sape Bay. On 29 June she reached Maumere on Flores, and next Geliting, somewhat to the east. On 2 July she anchored before Larantuka, from where Kupang on Timor was reached on the 5th. On the 10th she continued to Hansisi, and then to Ende on Flores (?) on the 12th. De Ruyter was back in Makassar on 28 July.

On 24 August 1897 De Ruyter left Makassar for Surabaya. On the 28th she entered the dry dock, and left it again on the 30th. On 14 September she was back in Makassar. On 19 September she arrived in Ampenan, Lombok, where she stayed.

On 20 October 1897 De Ruyter went back to Makassar. On 12 January 1898 she received news of an earthquake on Ambon, and she steamed thither on the 14th with all kinds of supplies. By 31 January she was back in Makassar. At the end of March new rifles were received on board. On 19 April De Ruyter left Makassar. From 21 April she then served at Lombok till 19 May. After some more trips to Lombok and back, she left Lombok for Batavia on 16 August. On 19 August she arrived in Tanjong Priok, Batavia. From 8–13 September De Ruyter used Tanjung Priok Dock of 4,000 tons, which had recently been commissioned. Further repairs lasted till 29 September. On 3 October 1897 De Ruyter left Batavia for Makassar. She stayed there from 7 till 24 October. She next arrived in Lombok on the 27th and in Surabaya on the 29th.

== Final home voyage ==
From 29 October 1898 till 25 January 1899, De Ruyter was in repair in Surabaya, so she could return to the Netherlands. Because Onrust Dock of 5,000 tons was in repair (and Onrust Dock of 3,000 tons was at Sabang?), she went to Singapore to use the dry dock there. Before leaving, she left her 17 cm A No. 1 guns at Surabaya, to serve in a coastal defense role.

On 25 January 1899 De Ruyter left Surabaya, arriving in Batavia on the 28th. On 3 February she continued to Singapore, where she stayed from 7 till 13 February in order to dock. After placing a weight of 58 ton on the fore, she entered a dry dock on 10 February, and left it on the 11th. From 17 February till 12 March, De Ruyter was anchored before Ulèë Lheuë, port of Banda Aceh.

On 12 March 1899 De Ruyter left Ulèë Lheuë. From 17 till 20 March she was at Colombo, from 31 March till 4 April at Aden. On 14 April she reached Port Said, from whence she left on the 18th. From 28 April till 1 May she was at Gibraltar. On 8 May she entered Nieuwediep, where she was decommissioned on 27 May. In July there was news that De Ruyter would be broken up. By March 1900, she had been stricken from the fleet. Auction would take place on 29 May 1900. She was bought by F.H. de Goeij, T.C. Bakker, and J. Spruit from Den Helder, to be demolished there. On 7 June she was moved from Willemsoord to Nieuwediep to be broken up.
