= Sebuku, Sumatra =

Island in the Sunda Strait

Sebuku
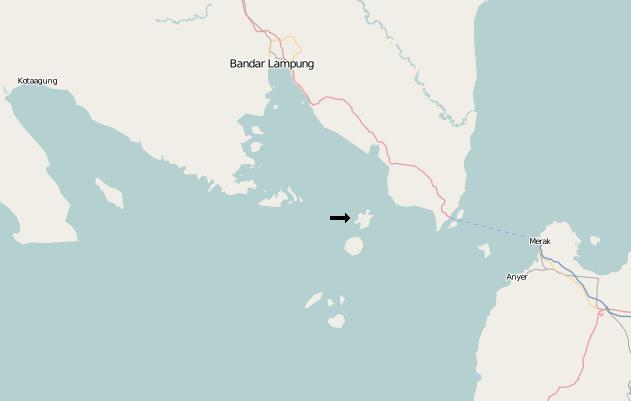
- Location of Sebuku in the Sunda Strait
- Interactive map of Sebuku

Geography
- Location: Southeast Asia
- Coordinates: 5°52′26″S 105°31′5″E
- Area: 17.71 km^{2} (6.84 sq mi)

Administration
- Indonesia

Sebuku (also spelled Seboekoe or Sebeekee) is an island in the Sunda Strait between Java and Sumatra. It is one of the larger islands in the strait and lies just 2.5 km (1.6 mi) to the north of Sebesi and 2.3 kilometres (1.4 mi) south of Sumatra. It is administratively part of South Lampung Regency, Lampung.

== History ==
At the time of the 1883 eruption of Krakatoa, Sebuku was uninhabited, but a village on Sebuku Ketjil, a small island to its east, was completely wiped out. Official records give 150 killed, with 70 being non-residents.

In the 1920s, copra palms were planted on Sebuku to satisfy the growing market. However, the palms eventually withered and died due to a lack of maintenance.

In 1999, a sunken Japanese ship was found near Sebuku by divers preparing for an underwater photography contest. Its age is unknown.

== Geography ==
Sebuku is a low island, located in the eastern part of the mouth of Lampung Bay, 2.5 kilometres (1.6 mi) north of Sebesi and 2.3 kilometres (1.4 mi) south of Sumatra. It covers a total area of 17.71 square kilometres (6.84 mi^{2}). It is administratively part of South Lampung Regency, Lampung.

Sebuku has a centre composed of andesite, indicating an early volcanic history. This centre has been dated to the Quaternary and has been called an early manifestation of volcanism in the Sunda Strait. The substrate on the northern side of the island consists of fossilised coral, mud and sand, while on the eastern side of the island, the substrate consists of mud, sand, gravel, and both live and fossilised coral. The outside is fringed by a reef.

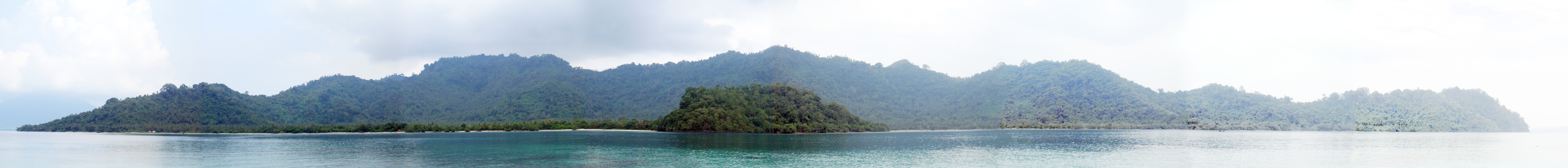
A panoramic montage of Sebuku Island

== Ecology ==
Sebuku and Sebesi have been noted as a "stepping stone" for butterfly migration between Sumatra and Krakatoa. There are numerous butterfly species from both Java and Sumatra on Sebuku. Four species of ants have been found on Sebuku, fewer than Sebesi and Krakatoa. These included ants not found on Krakatoa, thought to be descended from fauna that survived the 1883 eruption.

The waters near Sebuku have fewer echinoderms than those further into Lampung Bay. This is thought to be from exploitation and poor resource management.

Due to cultivation, few natural forests remain on Sebuku. However, along the eastern coast of Sebuku there are many mangroves. There are also tropical plants found throughout the island.

== Tourism ==
Sebuku is a popular destination for snorkelling and diving, with tourists generally arriving by boat from Candi village on Sumatra.

== Bibliography ==
- Asfiya, Wara; Ubaidillah, Rosichon; Yamane, Seiki (2008). "Ant (Hymenoptera: Formicidae) of the Krakataus, and Sebesi and Sebuku Islands" (PDF). Treubia. 36: 1–9. Archived from the original (PDF) on 7 October 2011.
- Barber, A. J.; Crow, M. J.; Milsom, J. S., eds. (2005). Lonely Planet: Indonesia. Bath, United Kingdom: The Geological Society Publishing House. ISBN 1-86239-156-4.
- Darsono, Prapto; Aziz, Aznam. "Khinodermata dari Beberapa Pulau di Teluk Lampung, Lampung, Sumatera" [Echinodermata Fauna on Some Islands of the Lampung Bay, Lampung, Sumatera] (PDF) (in Indonesian). Lembaga Ilmu Pengetahuan Indonesia. Archived from the original (PDF) on 25 April 2012.
- Yukawa, Junichi; Partomihardjo, Tukirin; Yata, Osamu; Hirowatari, Toshira (31 March 2000). "An Assessment of the Role of Sebesi Island as a Stepping-stone for the Colonisation of the Krakatau Islands by Butterflies" (PDF). Kyushu University. Archived from the original (PDF) on 7 October 2011.
- Simke, Tom; Fiske, Richard (1983). Krakatau 1883; The Volcanic Eruption & Its Effects. Washington, D.C.: Smithsonian. ISBN 0-87474-841-0.
- Soeroyo; Suyarso. "Kondisi dan Inventarisasi Hutan Mangrove di Kawasan Teluk Lampung" [Condition and Inventaritation on the Mangrove Forest of Lampung Bay] (PDF). Lembaga Ilmu Pengetahuan Indonesia. Archived from the original (PDF) on 25 April 2012.
- Touwen, Jeroen (2001). Extremes in the archipelago: trade and economic development in the Outer Islands of Indonesia, 1900–1942. Leiden: KITLV press. ISBN 90-6718-159-5.
- Vaisutis, Justine (2007). Lonely Planet: Indonesia. Lonely Planet. ISBN 978-1-74104-435-5.
