= Tabuan Island =

Island in Lampung province, Indonesia

Coordinates: 5°48′8″S 104°49′26″E

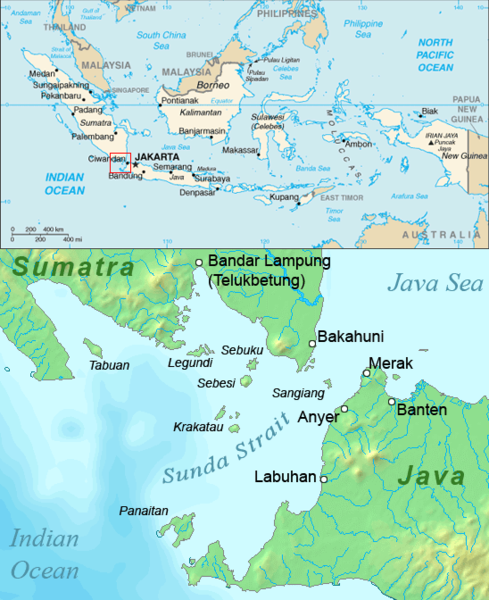
Tabuan located at the entrance to Semangka Bay in the Sunda Strait

Tabuan Island (Indonesian: Pulau Tabuan, also spelled Tabuhan or Taboean) is an island of southern Sumatra, under the jurisdiction of Lampung province. It is administered as part of the Cukuh Balak district of Tanggamus Regency.

It lies near the middle of the entrance of Semangka Bay, relatively steep and densely wooded. It rises in its south-eastern part to a height of 671m and is said to "appear sharp from S or N. Except on the NE side." Its principal settlement is the village of Sawangbalak, located on the extreme northern tip of the island. The island is noted for its white beaches. About 40 kilometres to the east is Legundi Island.

Internet access is unavailable and the telephone access is unstable in this island. A Rp18 billion pier was constructed in 2013 by the Ministry of Transportation but because most fishermen use small boats the pier is unmaintained and unused.
