= Sunda Strait Bridge =

Proposed road and rail bridge in Indonesia

Sunda Strait Bridge Jembatan Selat Sunda
- Coordinates: 5°57′22″S 105°51′18″E
- Carries: Motor vehicles, Trains
- Crosses: Straits of Sunda
- Official name: Sunda Strait Bridge
- Maintained by: –

Characteristics
- Design: Suspension bridge
- Total length: 27 km
- Width: –
- Longest span: –

History
- Designer: Government of Indonesia
- Constructed by: –
- Opened: –

Statistics
- Toll: Yes

Location
- Interactive map of Sunda Strait Bridge

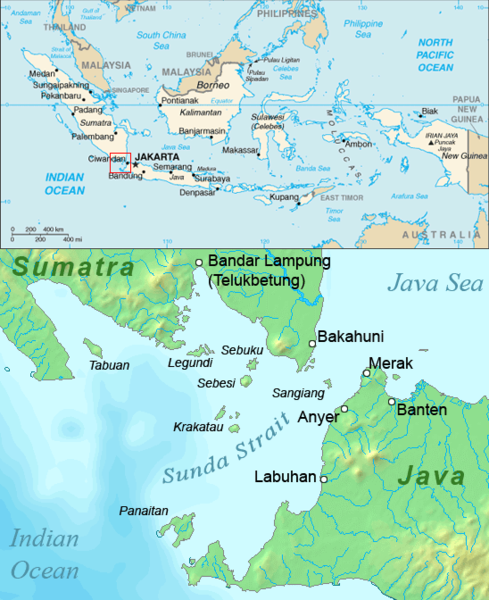
The Sunda Strait

The Sunda Strait Bridge (Indonesian: Jembatan Selat Sunda, JSS, Jembatan Selsun, sometimes referred to in English-language reports as the SSB) was a planned road and railway megaproject between the two large Indonesian islands of Sumatra and Java.

The suggestion for a bridge was reportedly first put forward in 1960 by Professor Sedyatmo from Institut Teknologi Bandung as a part of broader plans, known as Tri Nusa Bimasakti, to link the three islands of Sumatra, Java and Bali (the latter via the Bali Strait Bridge). In October 2007, after years of discussion and planning, the Indonesian government gave the initial go-ahead for a project which includes several of the world's longest suspension bridges, across the 27 km (17 mi) Sunda Strait. However, when Joko Widodo was elected, his incoming government announced in November 2014 that plans to build the bridge would be shelved.

== Outline of the project ==
Construction of the bridge would be an ambitious project, being much more expensive than any other single infrastructure investment yet carried out in Indonesia. If the project goes ahead as planned, it would join the list of the world's most expensive transport infrastructure.

The project, with an initial estimated minimum cost of at least US$10 billion but probably considerably more, is for a series of bridges carrying a six lane highway and double track railway traversing the three islands of Prajurit, Sangiang, and Ular in the strait. The upper structure with a span of 3,300 metres (10,800 ft) would be similar to the Messina Strait Bridge in Italy, while the lower structure with a span of 1,991 metres (6,532 ft) would be similar to the Akashi Kaikyō Bridge in Japan. Officials in the consortium that plan to build the bridge originally hoped that construction would begin in 2012 but even the plan to prepare a feasibility study was delayed beyond 2012. There were originally hopes that the first travellers might cross the bridge as early as 2020 although the likely completion date is tending to drift because of delays in discussions about plans for the project.

There are different views as to the most appropriate design for the details of the bridge, and even as to whether the construction of a bridge is the best way of easing the current serious transport bottlenecks for movement between Java and Sumatra. Alternatives which some observers favour are the construction of a tunnel or, more simply, improvements to the existing intensively used ferry services.

One of the various possible designs that has been mentioned involves a project of around 27 km in length with the following sections alternating across land and water:

Possible sections of Sunda Strait Bridge (illustrative example)

Section	Length (km)	Structure	Location
Section I	4.9	Road	Java to Ular Island
Section II	6.5	Suspension bridge	Ular Island to Sangiang Island
Section III	6.5	Road	Across Sangiang Island
Section IV	4.0	Suspension bridge	Sangiang Island to Prajurit Island
Section V	5.4	Road	Prajurit Island to Sumatra
Total	27.3		

One of the difficult technical challenges to be considered is the fact that the strait is near the Sunda Trench in one of the world's most dangerous earthquake zones and is frequently rocked by significant tremors. Many active volcanoes lie in the area, including Krakatoa only 40 km away. The best known eruption of Krakatau in 1883 culminated in a series of massive explosions that killed tens of thousands of people.

The bridge would significantly cut the travel time across the Sunda Strait which takes several hours by ferry. Some 20 million people crossed the strait in 2006 and the figure is forecast to double by 2020. The bridge would connect Java, with a population (2011) of around 140 million, with Sumatra (population around 52 million). A bridge might encourage some Jabodetabek commuters to move to Lampung province in southern Sumatra from Banten in West Java. The capital Jakarta lies some 100 km (65 mi) to the east of the strait, on Java. Java is the most populous island in the world, and Sumatra is fifth.

A BBC news report in June 2010 put the estimated cost at $20bn and suggested that construction may start as early as 2011.

== Timeline ==
=== Pre-2012 ===
Pre 2000

- Various references made as early as the 1960s to the possibility of building a bridge across the Sunda Strait. From time to time, senior political figures, academics, and others, mentioned the desirability of considering the project.

2007

- Early announcements made of plans to build the bridge. Early costs of $10 bn were mentioned.
- May: The provincial governments of Lampung and Banten announce support for the plans to build the Sunda Strait Bridge. Earlier plans to build a tunnel were declared too risky and too expensive.

2009

- Aug: A pre-feasibility study on the construction of the bridge, conducted by PT Bangungraha Sejahtera Mulia, was presented to the Indonesian Government.
- Dec: President Susilo Bambang Yudhoyono established a high-level ministerial committee chaired by the Coordinating Economic Minister to oversee preparations for the construction of the bridge.

2010

- Some reports had raised the possible cost of the bridge to $20 bn.

2011

- Jan:The provincial governments of Lampung and Banten indicated that they were ready to form a consortium to participate in the construction of the bridge as soon as president Susilo Bambang Yudhoyono issued a Presidential Decree (Peraturan Presiden) setting out details of the establishment of a proposed Strategic Infrastructure Enterprise Zone to support plans for the bridge. Coordinating Minister Hatta Rajasa said that the degree would be ready within a week.
- Apr: The bridge was listed as a megaproject in the proposed Sumatra Economic Corridor in Indonesian Government's Economic Masterplan (see details below).
- Apr: GS Engineering and Construction Corporation from South Korea affirmed its interest in participating in the construction of the bridge. It would stretch 31 kilometers from Anyer, Banten to Bakauheni, Lampung through Sanghyang, Prajurit and Ular islands.
- May: Coordinating Economic Minister Hatta Rajasa said South Korea had expressed an interest in helping construct the bridge
- Sep: President Susilo Bambang Yudhoyono said that construction would start by 2014.
- Dec: President Susilo Bambang Yudhoyono signed a Presidential Regulation (Peraturan Presiden) to facilitate further planning for the construction of the bridge. This Regulation, amongst other things, established the KSISS area (Kawasan Strategis dan Infrastruktur Selat Sunda, or Sunda Strait Infrastructure and Strategic Zone). Ground breaking for the bridge was expected to take place in 2014.

=== 2012 ===
- Jan: Public Works Minister Djoko Kirmanto said that the feasibility study for the bridge would start in 2012 and take two years to complete. He also said that one of the state-run construction companies would take part in the project although which company was not specified. He estimated that the bridge would cost around Rp 125 trillion to build (around US$13.9 billion at prevailing exchange rates) and that discussions had been held with experts from Japan and South Korea about the details of construction.
- Feb: the president director of PT Graha Banten Lampung Sejahtera (PT GBLS), the consortium established to prepare development plans for the bridge, noted that arrangements were going slowly because government commitment was "lacking." He said the key to progress "lies in the government's hands." The consortium consists of companies owned by the Banten and Lampung district governments along with PT Bangungraha Sejahtera Mulia, a subsidiary of the Artha Graha Network owned by Indonesian businessman Tomy Winata.
- Mar: During a visit by president Susilo Bambang Yodhoyono to Beijing, an agreement was signed to facilitate a joint investment in the Sunda Strait Strategic and Infrastructure Development Plan between PT Bangun Sejahtera Mulia and China Railway Construction. Tommy Winata said that he hoped that Chinese business groups would finance the entire Sunda Strait project estimated to cost around $12 billion.
- Apr: The Office of the Coordinating Minister said that the Ministry of Finance was still preparing details to cover tendering details for the bridge. A special regulation was needed to provide some preferences for the project initiator, PT Graha Banten Lampung Sejahtera (PT GBLS), but also to ensure proper tender arrangements.
- Jun: The Ministry of Finance indicated that it did not support the provision of preferences for project initiators which might affect tendering arrangements. The Ministry proposed a revision to the earlier (December 2011) presidential regulation to remove stipulations that provided preferences to firms which prepared feasibility studies for the bridge. Under the revised arrangements the government itself would finance the feasibility study so there would be no need to provide any special considerations for the project initiator. An editorial in The Jakarta Post noted that 'the finance minister's recommendation that the presidential decree be amended ... could save the project from becoming a potentially huge political and fiscal "time bomb" '.
- Jul: The Export-Import Bank (Exim Bank) of the U.S. is reported to have expressed interest in providing long-term finance.
- Jul: The governors of Lampung and Banten provinces voice objections to the proposal that the central government would take over the funding of the feasibility plan from the consortium that the governors had been supporting.
- Jul: Disagreements between the Minister of Finance and other ministers, including the Coordinating Economic Minister Hatta Rajasa, attracted considerable comment in the national press. The main disagreements were reported to be about the arrangements for a feasibility study for the bridge as well as associated concessions to be offered in the tender process.
- Nov: It was announced that consideration was being given to classifying the bridge as a "solicited project" in order to help clarify the legal basis of the project. In the case of "solicited projects", the initiative for developing the project lies with the Indonesian government. In contrast, "unsolicited projects" are initiated by a private sector entity. To clarify this matter, a revision to Presidential Instruction No 86/2011 on the Sunda Strait Strategic Infrastructure Region would be needed.

=== 2013 ===
- Jan: The Minister for Public Works, Djoko Kirmanto, was reported as saying that perhaps, given the ongoing delays within government during discussions over plans for the bridge, ground breaking might not be possible in 2014 as earlier planned.
- Mar: During a visit to Germany president SBY said that the bridge was a strategic investment which would accelerate development in Sumatra and Java. He said that although there was currently some controversy surrounding plans for the bridge, construction must go ahead. He said that because the bridge itself would not generate sufficient return to cover costs, zones at each end of the bridge would need to be developed to generate commercial revenues.

=== 2014 ===
- Feb: Coordinating Economic Minister Hatta Rajasa said that that government had decided that the construction of the bridge would be left to the next administration (due to take office in October 2014) and that no state money would be spent on the mega project. He did, however, indicate that state-owned enterprises were likely to be expected to support the project. At the same time, Public Works Minister Djoko Kirmanto said that the government would soon appoint an executive body for the construction of the bridge.
- Mar: Coordinating Economic Minister Hatta Rajasa said that that government would offer certain incentives for investors willing to take part in the construction of the bridge. He declined, however, to provide details of what incentives might be offered, saying that the matter would need further discussion between the government and any potential investors.
- May: Newly appointed Coordinating Economic Minister Chairul Tanjung said that attention to the bridge would receive priority in the coming five months (up to the time that a new president would take office in Indonesia). He said that the bridge would need to be funded using non-state budget resources.
- Nov: It was announced that the new Joko Widodo government would shelve plans to build the bridge. The new National Development Planning minister, Andrinof Chaniago, said that President Joko Widodo had decided that construction of the bridge was "not in line with his maritime-based development vision." Andrinof said that the government believed there were cheaper alternatives to improving connectivity between Java and Sumatra including by buying new ships and improving services in ports. Minister Andrinof said that "I am convinced that constructing the Sunda Strait Bridge is not an option for us, at least not in the next 10 or 15 years."

== 2011 Economic Masterplan ==
The bridge, included as part of a planned Sumatra economic corridor in the Indonesian government's 2011–2015 Masterplan released in May 2011, is listed as the single largest project (costed at Rp 150 trillion, or around $15 billion) in the plan. Details provided in the Masterplan indicate that the bridge is planned to be part of the Sunda Straits National Strategic Area and is part of the overall plan to improve connectivity across Indonesia. The Masterplan provides the following additional details as an outline of the project.

The bridge is expected to provide:

- Efficient transportation between Sumatra and Java, relatively free of weather and wave problems. Travel is expected to be reduced to around 30 minutes compared to the time needed for the current ferry services (two to three hours). In addition, the bridge is expected to provide a rail link for both passengers and freight.
- Infrastructure for the installation of pipes for liquids and gas, cables and fibre optic networks, as well a being a centre for tidal-based electricity.

The Masterplan notes that the bridge will be located on a key Indonesian sea lane. Technical characteristics of the bridge should therefore allow for the passage of container and passenger ships as well as vessels such as Nimitz class aircraft carriers and other ships as large as the USS Enterprise. It is also noted that the design of the bridge, as well as allowing for the inclusion of a railway, should also consider technical aspects such as the precise location (site) of the structure, geology, faults, seabed contours, seismicity, volcanology, and the risk of tsunamis.

The benefits of the bridge mentioned in the Masterplan are the following:

- Facilitating a shift in the development of industrial activities, currently concentrated in Java, towards Sumatra.
- Promoting the development of the agricultural sector in Sumatra as a supplier of products to Java.
- Facilitating development of economic activities near the bridge (such as the tourist resort of Tanjung Lesung (1,500 ha), the area around the Bojonegara container terminal (500 ha) in Banten and the industrial estate in Cilegon, both in Java, and other industrial and warehousing sites in the province of Lampung on the Sumatra side of the strait).
- Assisting the broader development of the industrial, tourism, and transportation sectors, including across ASEAN and Australia. The map of geo-economic tourism focused on 12 of the National Tourist Destinations is expected to change once the bridge is completed.

The Masterplan notes that preparations for the accelerated development of the bridge should include the following:

- Acceleration of the preparation of a Presidential Regulation to allow for the regulation of the bridge, possibly including arrangements for public-private partnership schemes (which may include the provincial government, national and local state-owned enterprises, and other strategic partners).
- Preparing procedures for an agency or team to conduct a feasibility study, including issues relating to prices and negotiated concessions.
- Development of infrastructure associated with the bridge (such as the Panimbang – Serang toll road, South Banten airport, Bojonegoro container port, and the Cilegon – Bojonegoro 14 km toll road).
- Planning for spatial impact of the bridge on Java and Sumatra.

== Financing ==
It is not yet clear how such expensive infrastructure would be paid for. The Indonesian government has said that much of the cost will need to be financed through the private sector. This reflects the current interest in Indonesia in the use of Public Private Partnerships (PPPs) for investments in infrastructure. One possibility is for the bridge to be financed through a "turn-key project" arrangement. Other options include the offering of shares in the project through an initial public offering (IPO) or establishing a backdoor listing through a company already listed on the stock exchange. There has also been discussion of various tax concessions that might be provided by the Indonesian Government (such as exemptions from import taxes and value-added tax) to facilitate the project.

There have been numerous reports of possible financial support from various countries although no firm arrangements have been announced. They include the U.S., Japan, China and Korea.

== Debate about the project ==
The project is not without its critics. Some commentators have argued that the funds could be better used for other urgent infrastructure projects. Others have argued that overall policies relating to interisland transport are more important than the construction of the bridge. Concerns voiced about the project have focused on both technical aspects and economic and financial matters. The Jakarta consulting firm Independent Research and Advisory Indonesia (IRAI) carried out an early assessment of the project and concluded that "on its own the project is neither financially nor economically viable."

Few public details have yet been released by the Indonesian Government about these matters. A thorough cost-benefit analysis is not yet available. A well-informed public discussion has therefore not yet been possible. The Indonesian government's Agency for the Assessment and Application of Technology (Badan Pengkajian dan Penerapan Teknology, or BPPT) has sponsored a number of preliminary discussions about aspects of the possible bridge technology in recent years. Some of the difficult technical, financial and economic issues involved in the construction of the Channel Tunnel between the United Kingdom and France appear to be relevant for planning about the best arrangements for a transport connection across the Sunda Strait. Demand forecasts for the use of the Channel Tunnel, for example, turned out to be far too optimistic thus leading to a benefit shortfall. The result was that revenues received through the operation of the tunnel were much less than expected during the first few years of operation.

=== Technical issues ===
Access to and use of land for infrastructure activities often gives rise to disagreements in Indonesia. Some concerns have already been expressed about land issues in connection with the project.

A second set of technical issues concerns the geological risks involved in locating such a major project close to sites of possible volcanic activity. The Krakatoa island group, for example, is nearby.

A third set of concerns relates to whether it is best to build a bridge at all, or whether alternative approaches (such as improved ferry services) might be a better way of responding to the rapidly growing demand for improved transport services across the strait.

=== Economic and financial issues ===
Some commentators have expressed concerns about the high (and uncertain) cost of the project. Other uncertain issues relate to financing, likely pricing and revenue policies (toll arrangements), likely demand for (use of) the facility, and the cost of compensation for land acquired during the course of construction. Tendering processes are also often a source of considerable controversy in Indonesia and so questions have been raised about the nature of the letting of competitive tenders for the bridge.

=== Other considerations ===
Proponents of the bridge point to various considerations in support of the project. The Governors of Banten and Lampung along with local business and community representatives argue that the bridge would have important regional development benefits. Other observers point to the stimulus that the construction of the bridge could provide to the development of technical engineering skills in Indonesia.

Some proponents of the bridge also point to safety and associated water traffic considerations which they argue point to the need for a bridge. The Sunda Strait is a very busy waterway. The management of water traffic is complicated by the need to accommodate two major flows of traffic running east-west and north-south. The east-west flow mainly consists of the numerous domestic Indonesian ferries carrying passengers and goods while the north-south flow tends to be made up of international shipping which includes many large cargo vessels heading towards northeast Asia. Accidents occur from time to time, sometimes with loss of life. In September 2012, for example, eight people died when a domestic Indonesian ferry, the KMP Bahuga Jaya, carrying more than 200 people collided with a larger seagoing vessel, the tanker Norgas Cathinka, while crossing the strait. The incident, and the resulting court case, served to highlight numerous difficult issues which affect the poorly enforced regulatory arrangements that underpin the use of the sea lanes in the Sunda Strait.

Another problem is that there are often major traffic delays as long lines of trucks queue up to access the ferry services from Merak port which cross the strait. It is not uncommon for hundreds of large trucks to be caught in queues stretching back from the port for up to 10 km or more and for drivers to have to wait for two or three days to board one of the ferries. Traffic jams are especially likely to occur when bad weather and high waves lead to reductions in ferry services.

== Legal and regulatory arrangements ==
Four main legal instruments have been issued by the government which have a significant bearing on plans for construction of the bridge:

- 2008: Government Regulation (Peraturan Pemerintah, or PP) No 26/2008 on National Spatial Planning.
- 2009: Presidential Decree (Keputusan Presiden, or Keppres) No 36/2009 on the National Team for the Preparations of the Sunda Strait Bridge Development.
- 2011: Presidential Regulation (Peraturan Presiden, or Perpres) No 32/2011 on the Master Plan for the Acceleration and Expansion of Indonesia's Economic Development 2011–2025 (known as MP3EI).
- 2011: Presidential Regulation (Peraturan Presiden, or Perpres) No 86/2011 on Development of the Sunda Strait Infrastructure and Regional Development (KSISS).

== See also ==
- Malacca Strait Bridge, another ambitious plan linking Indonesia and Malaysia
