= Sangiang =

Island in West Java, Indonesia

Coordinates: 5°57′21″S 105°51′18″E

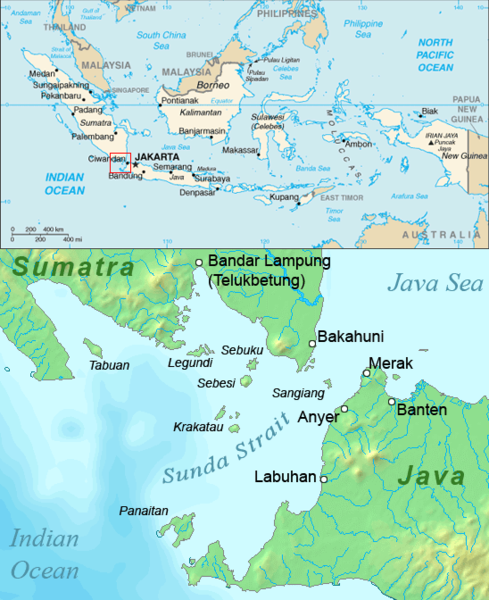
The Sunda Strait, with Sangiang identified

Sangiang is an island midway in the Sunda Strait between the Indonesian islands of Sumatra and Java. Administratively it is a part of Banten province of western Java. One current design for the ambitious Sunda Strait Bridge allows for part of the bridge to be built crossing the island. This island has the status of a nature reserve.

Colonial Dutch authorities called the island Dwars-in-den-weg ('Thwart-the-Way'; 'In the Way').

== History ==
It is said that for the Lampung people in Banten, Sangiang is known as a 'gift' from the Banten Sultanate after they spread Islam in the region around the 17th century. Minak Sangaji, an envoy from Lampung, was given power by Banten Sultanate in the western part, includes Cikoneng with Pak Pekon (four villages), namely Tegal, Bojong, Cikoneng, and Salatuhur, then Ujung Kulon and Sangiang to the north.

After Indonesian independence, the customary land was not only enjoyed by descendants of the Lampung Cikoneng people, but also by many immigrants from outside the village. They opened fields and settled on the island, especially the Sundanese and Javanese.

== Population ==
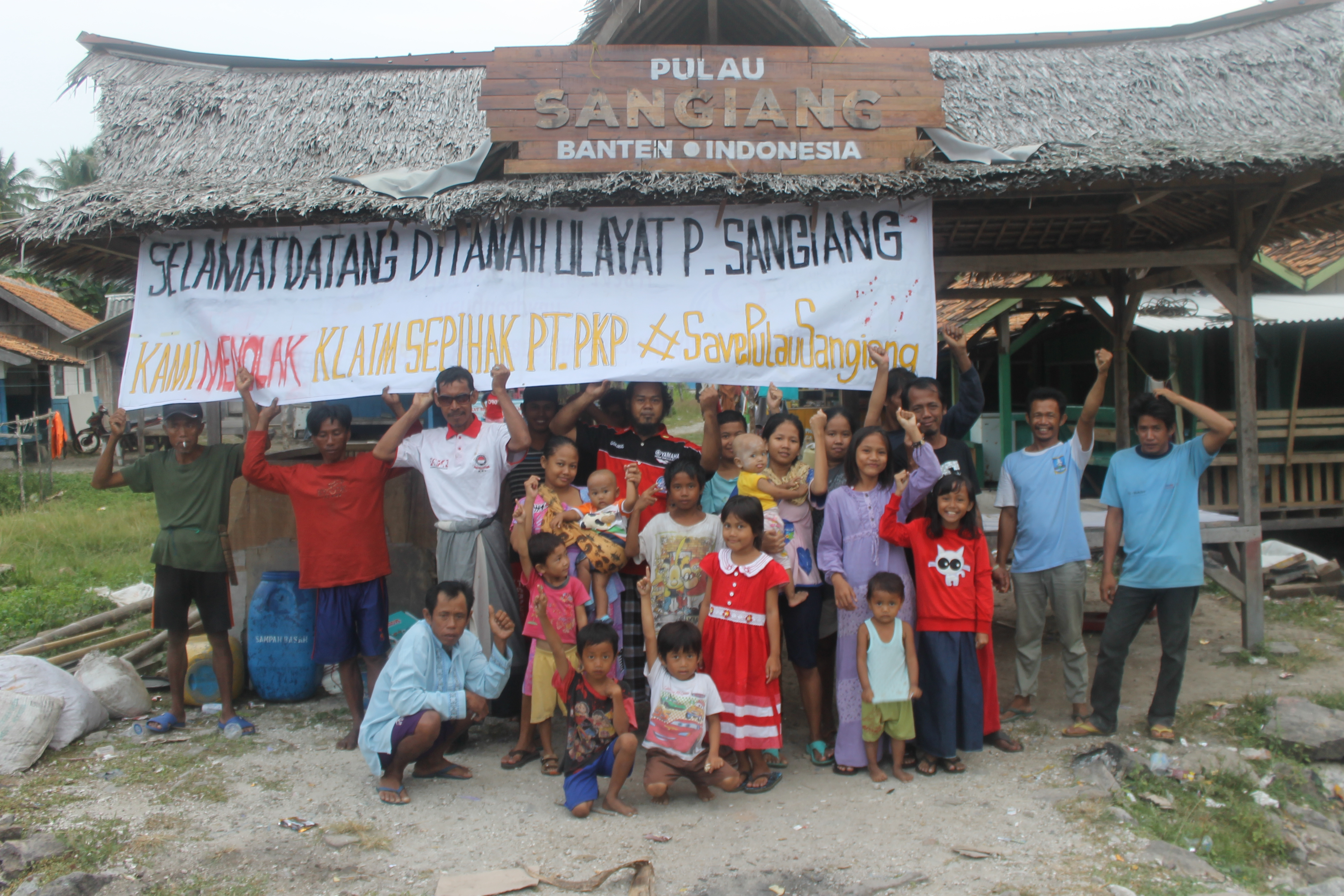
Sangiang people with banners rejecting unilateral claims by private company, related to agrarian conflict, 2017.

During the President Soeharto era, especially since the 1980s, the population at that time was 122 families, the government immediately designated the island, which covers an area of around 700 hectares, as a nature reserve area.

The Central Bureau of Statistics recorded that there were 37 families on Sangiang as of November 2022. However, in the next five months, the islanders were continuously lured off the island by people claiming to be from a company. As of March 2023, there were 25 surviving families, including seven elderly women.

== See also ==
- List of islands of Indonesia
