= Bali Strait =

Stretch of water separating Java and Bali

- Selat Bali (Indonesian)
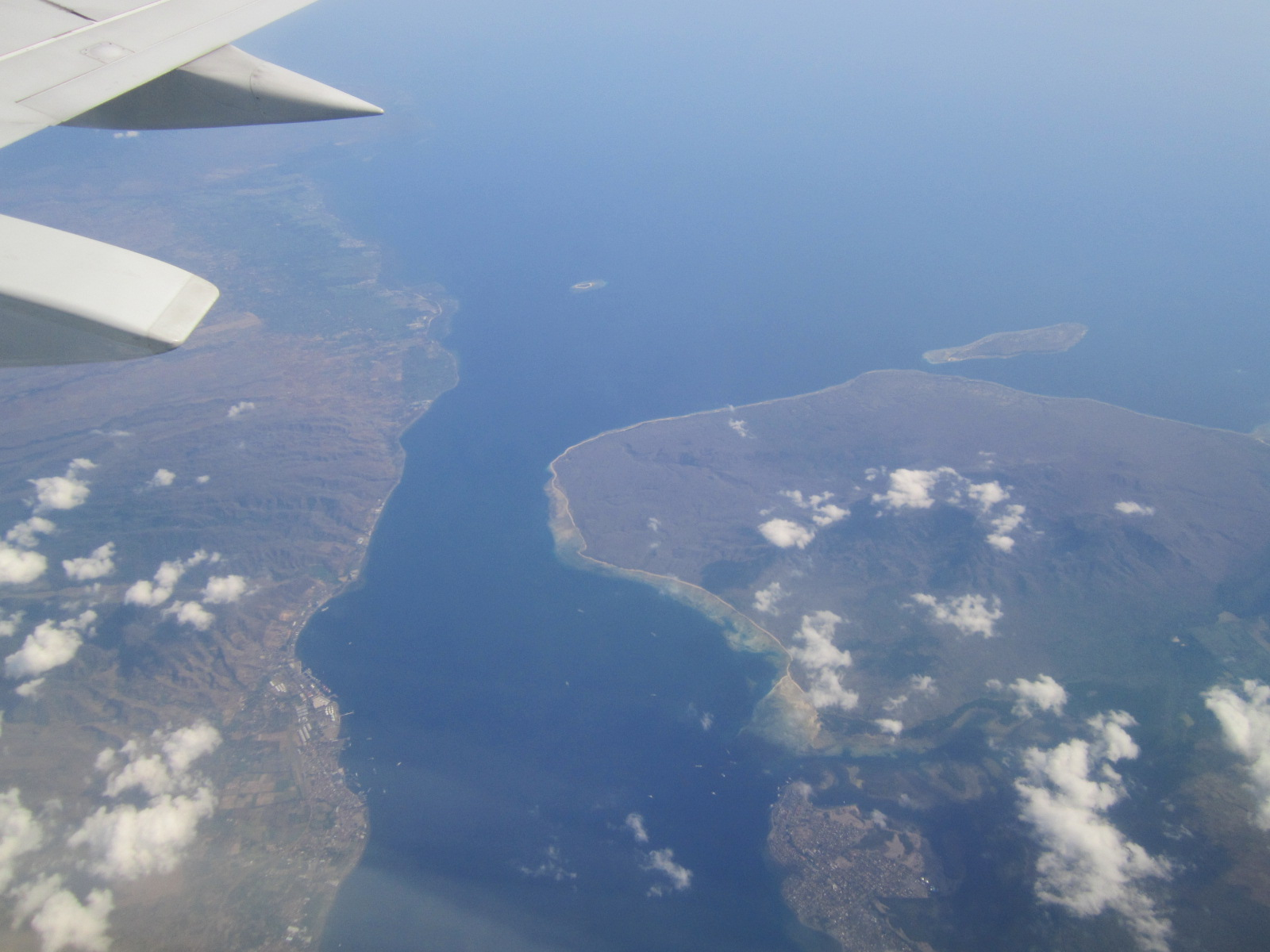
- Aerial view of the Strait with Java on the left and Bali on the right

- Location within Bali
- Coordinates: 8°18′S 114°25′E
- Type: strait
- Basin countries: Indonesia
- Max. length: 60 kilometers (37 mi)
- Min. width: 2.4 kilometers (1.5 mi)
- Average depth: 60 meters (200 ft)
- References: Selat Bali: Indonesia National Geospatial-Intelligence Agency, Bethesda, MD, U.S.

Bali Strait is a stretch of water separating Java and Bali while connecting the Indian Ocean and the Bali Sea. At its narrowest, the strait is 2.4 kilometers (1.5 mi) wide.

== Geography ==
The Bali Strait is one of the bodies of water surrounding the island of Bali: Lombok Strait to the east, the Badung Strait to the southeast, the Bali Sea to the north, the Indian Ocean to the southwest, and the Bali Strait to the west.

Geologically the two islands of Bali and Java were joined until the end of the last ice age when the sea rose and cut the land bridge. They both share part of the tectonic plate called the Sunda shelf.

== Transportation ==
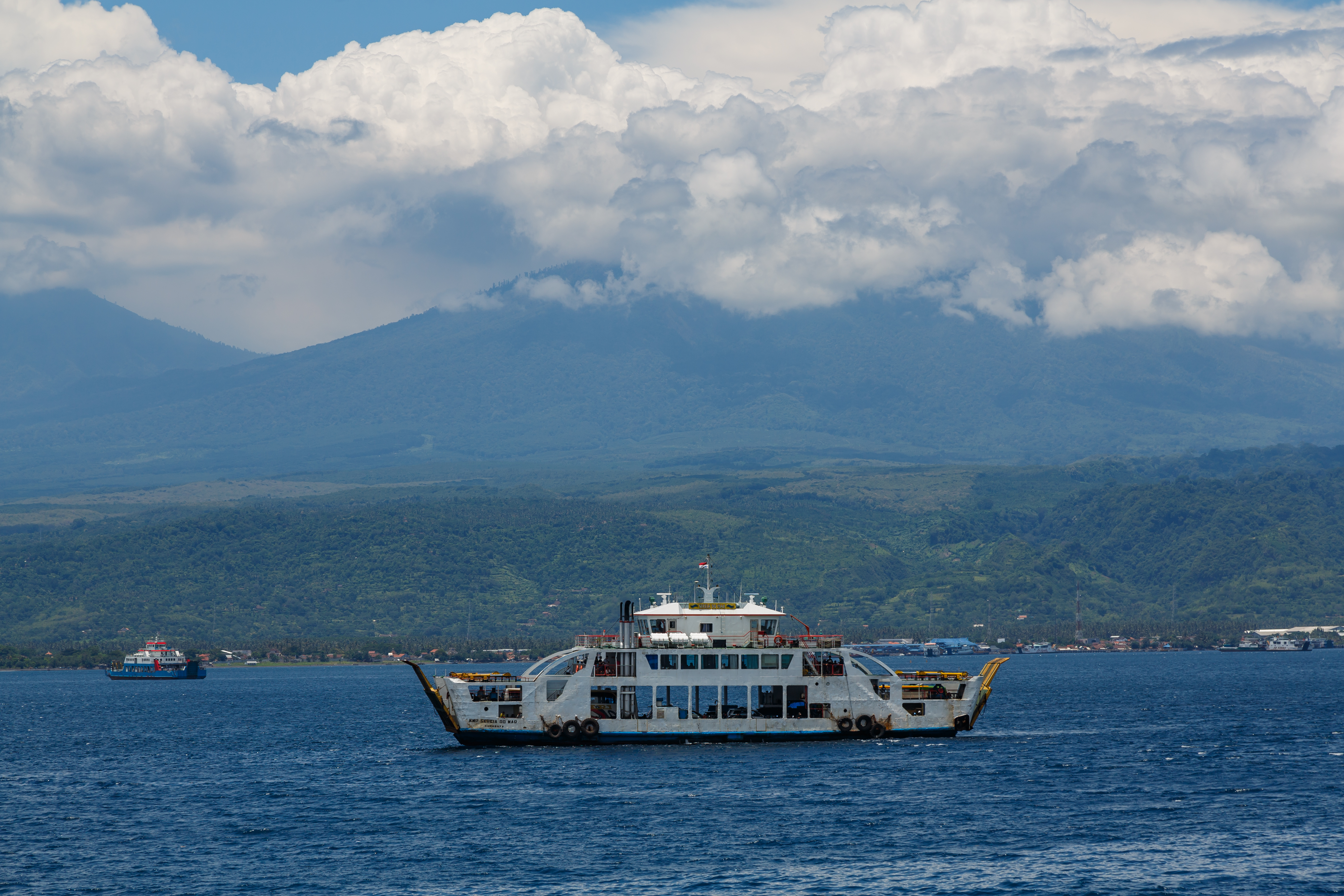
The ferry KMP Sereia Do Mar in the Bali Strait between Banyuwangi and Gilimanuk.

The Indonesian government has considered a bridge across the strait. The project is obstructed by economic hardships, as well as objections from certain locals in Bali. Currently there is no fixed link to Bali, only a ferry between Ketapang in Java and Gilimanuk, Jembrana Regency, Bali.

== History ==
During the Bali Strait incident of 28 January 1797, a French Navy squadron of six frigates encountered six British East Indiaman in the Bali Strait. Disguising themselves as ships of the line, the British ships were able to intimidate the French into withdrawing.

== Ecology ==
The temperature of the water in Bali Strait is subject to noticeable seasonal fluctuations, predetermined by the periods of monsoons. During the period of the northwestern monsoon (January–March), average temperature is about 28–29 °C, whereas in the southeast (July–September) temperature drops to 26 °C. Regardless of the season, the water temperature in the northern part of the strait is 1–1.5 degrees lower than it is in the southern part. The level of salinity is more stable: about 33 ‰ in the season of the northwestern monsoons and about 34 ‰ in the southeast period. Sea currents in the strait have a very complex configuration, largely dependent on monsoon seasons: during the northwesterly winds, the northern vector predominates, while in the south-east it is the southern one. The maximum speed – up to 13 km / h – flows reach the northern, most narrow part of the strait. Tidal currents have a semi-diurnal amplitude.

At the beginning of the 21st century, there were noticeable negative trends in the development of the ecological situation in the strait and on its shores, related to human economic activity. Numerous cases of water pollution with industrial wastes, fertilizers, as well as chemicals used in gold mining on the Javanese shore are recorded.

== See also ==
- Bali Strait Bridge
