= Siger Tower =

- Menara Siger (Indonesian)
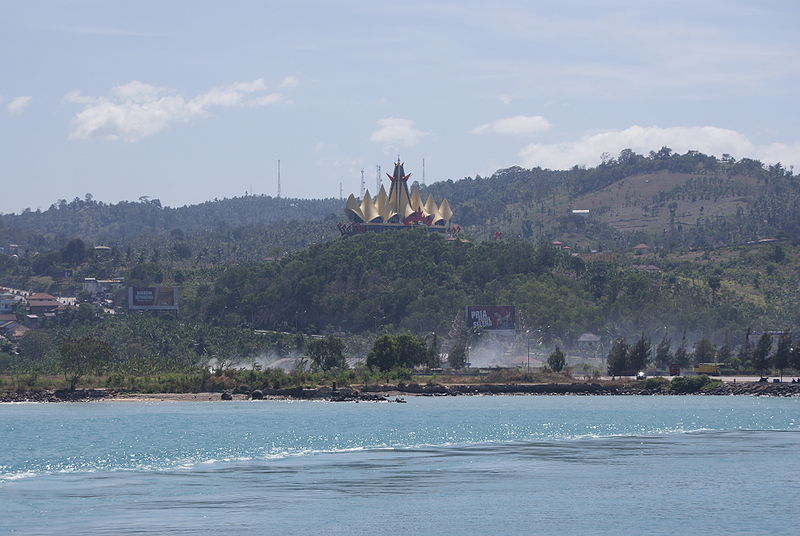
- View of Siger Tower and Bakauheni Port from Sunda Strait

- Location within Lampung

General information
- Location: Bukit Gamping, Bakauheni, South Lampung Regency, Indonesia
- Coordinates: 5.8655007°S 105.74972819999999°E
- Construction started: 2005
- Completed: 30 April 2008
- Cost: 15.000.000.000 IDR (about 1.3 million US$)

Height
- Height: 32 metres (105 ft)

Technical details
- Floor count: 6

Design and construction
- Architect: Ir. Anshori Djausal M.T

Siger Tower (Indonesian: Menara Siger) is a tower which is the zero point in southern Sumatra. It can be seen clearly when entering the port of Bakauheni, and it has become characteristic of the Lampung province gate.

"Siger" derives its name from the traditional customary hat for brides in Lampung's culture. The tower is colored yellow and red, representing the golden color of the bride's traditional hat. The tower is also in the form of a crown and consists of nine series which symbolizes the nine languages of Lampung. The building is also decorated with Tapis, the traditional Lampung cloth.

It was inaugurated by the governor of Lampung province, Sjachroedin Z.P. At the opening, the governor entered the tower together with ambassadors from Croatia, Sri Lanka, Japan, Palestine, Afghanistan, Singapore, the Philippines, the family of Sultan Banten and Sultan Kanoman Cirebon.

The inauguration of the Siger Tower was marked by pressing the sirens, signing the inscriptions, and releasing the doves to the accompaniment of the Mars Lampung song Sang Bumi Ruwa Jurai by the Music Corps (Korsik) Lampung Provincial Government, Ny. Truly Sjachrroedin cut a string of jasmine at the entrance of six-story tower building.

The location of the Siger Tower is on the Limestone Hill (Indonesian: Bukit Gamping) of Bakauheni Village, Bakauheni District, South Lampung, Lampung Province, with a height of about 110 metres (360 ft) above sea level.
