= Bali Strait Bridge =

Planned bridge in Indonesia between Bali and Java

Coordinates: 8.1°S 114.41667°E

The Bali Strait Bridge (Indonesian: Jembatan Selat Bali, JSB), is a proposed road and railway megaproject between the two Indonesian islands of Java and Bali across the Bali Strait. The Bali Strait Bridge is envisioned as a critical infrastructure project connecting the islands of Sumatra (had the Sunda Strait Bridge proposal went through), Java, and Bali, providing a continuous and elevated route over both land and sea. The design of the bridge accounts for the challenging conditions of the Bali Strait, which - although only 2.4 km at its narrowest point - is known for its high waves and strong currents.

The suggestion for a bridge was reportedly first put forward in 1960 by Professor Sedyatmo from Institut Teknologi Bandung as a part of broader plans, known as Tri Nusa Bimasakti, to link the three islands of Sumatra, Java and Bali. The Indonesian Government is planning the design of the bridge but there is no official date for construction yet.

== Controversy ==
Chairman of Parisada Hindu Dharma Indonesia (PHDI) Jembrana Regency, I Komang Arsana rejected the construction of the Bali Strait bridge. According to him, in the Dang Hyang Sidimantra from Balinese Hindu mythology, Bali and Java were deliberately disconnected so that the sea serves as a filter to prevent negative things influences from outside reaching Bali.

== See also ==
- Sunda Strait Bridge
- Suramadu Bridge
- Bali Strait
