= Prajurit =

Island in Indonesia

Prajurit (also spelled Panjurit in Google Map) is an islet in Indonesia some 3 kilometers (1.9 mi) off the cost of Sumatra in the Sunda Strait.

The planned Sunda Strait Bridge will utilise the islet.

== See also ==
- List of islands of Indonesia
