= Port of Bakauheni =

Coordinates: 5°52′10″S 105°45′12″E

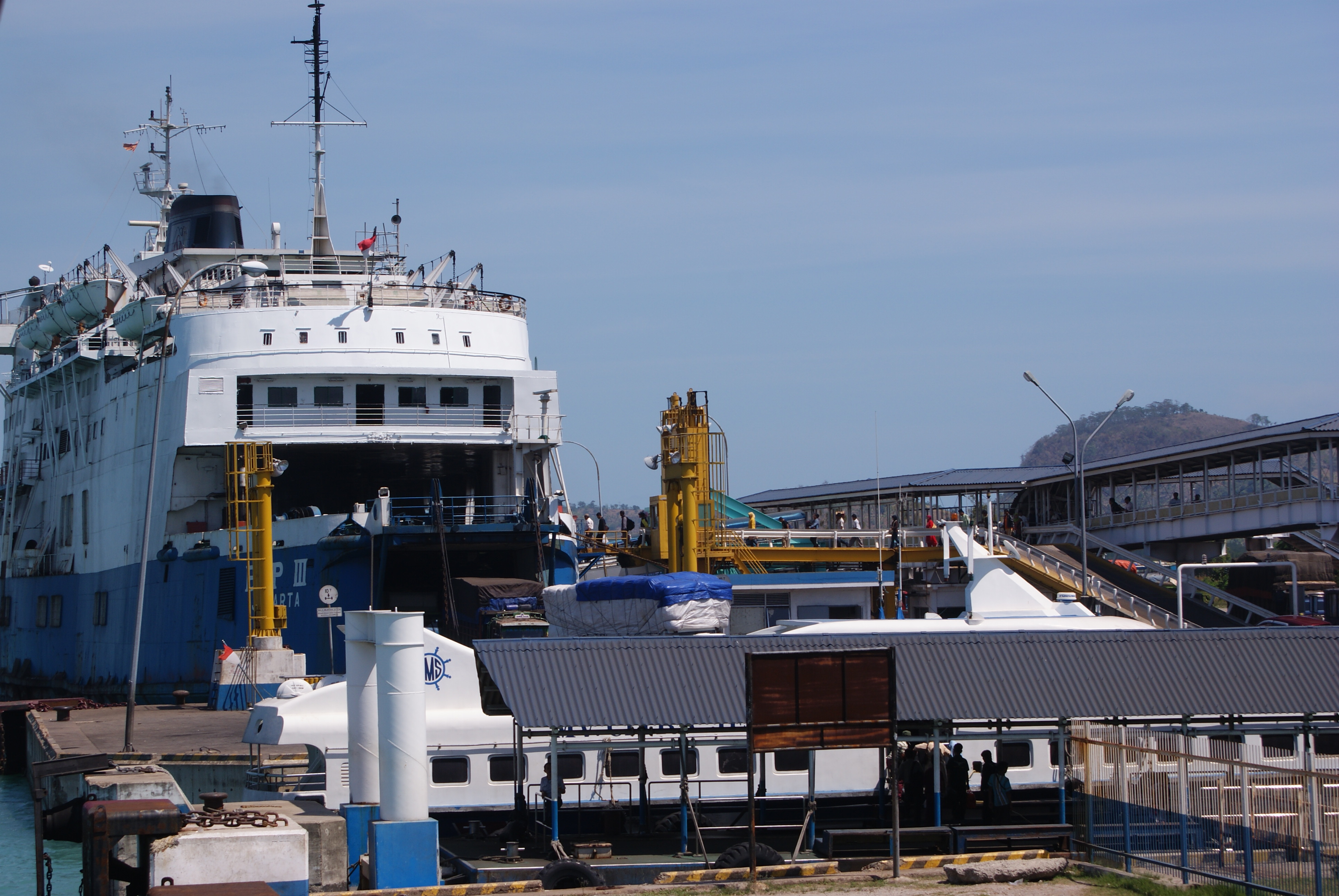
- Ro-ro ship at Port of Bakauheni
- Interactive map of Port of Bakauheni
- Native name: Pelabuhan Bakauheni

Location
- Country: Indonesia
- Location: Bakauheni, South Lampung, Lampung, Indonesia

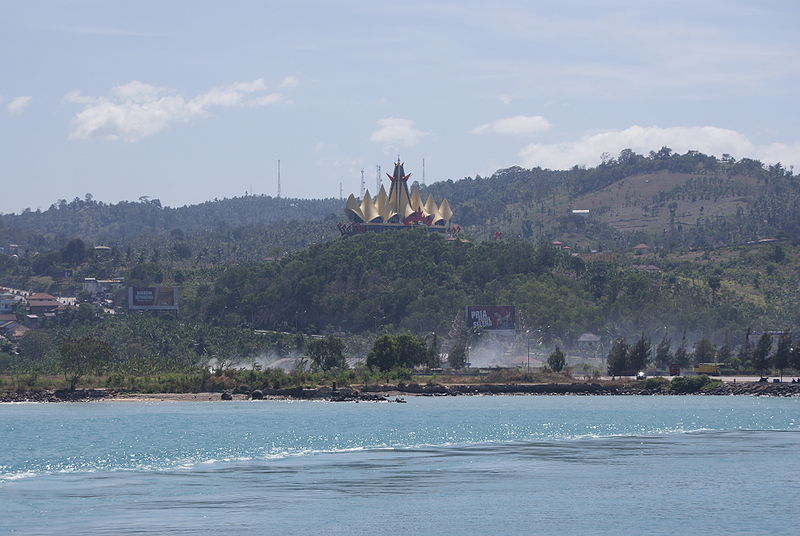
Port of Bakauheni and Siger Tower

Bakauheni is a town in the southern part of the province of Lampung, Indonesia, and is the largest and busiest port in the province, and also one of the busiest ports in Indonesia. Ferries carrying passengers and vehicles, particularly large trucks, connect Bakauheni with Port of Merak in Java across the Sunda Strait. There are plans for a Sunda Strait Bridge to connect the Bakauheni district with Java. The harbour is managed by the national ferry company ASDP Indonesia Ferry.

The Merak-Bakauheni ferry route is operated 24 hours per day, with on average one ferry departure per 12 minutes. The average duration of trips required between Bakauheni - Merak or otherwise by ferry is about 2 hours. Public transportation users can also use small boats to speed up the trip, reducing travel time to about an hour. However, this option is also more expensive, and ships are only available from morning until the late afternoon, when the water is not too rough. The port is busier during mudik tradition, especially in new year and Ied Mubarak days.
