= Trumon =

- District
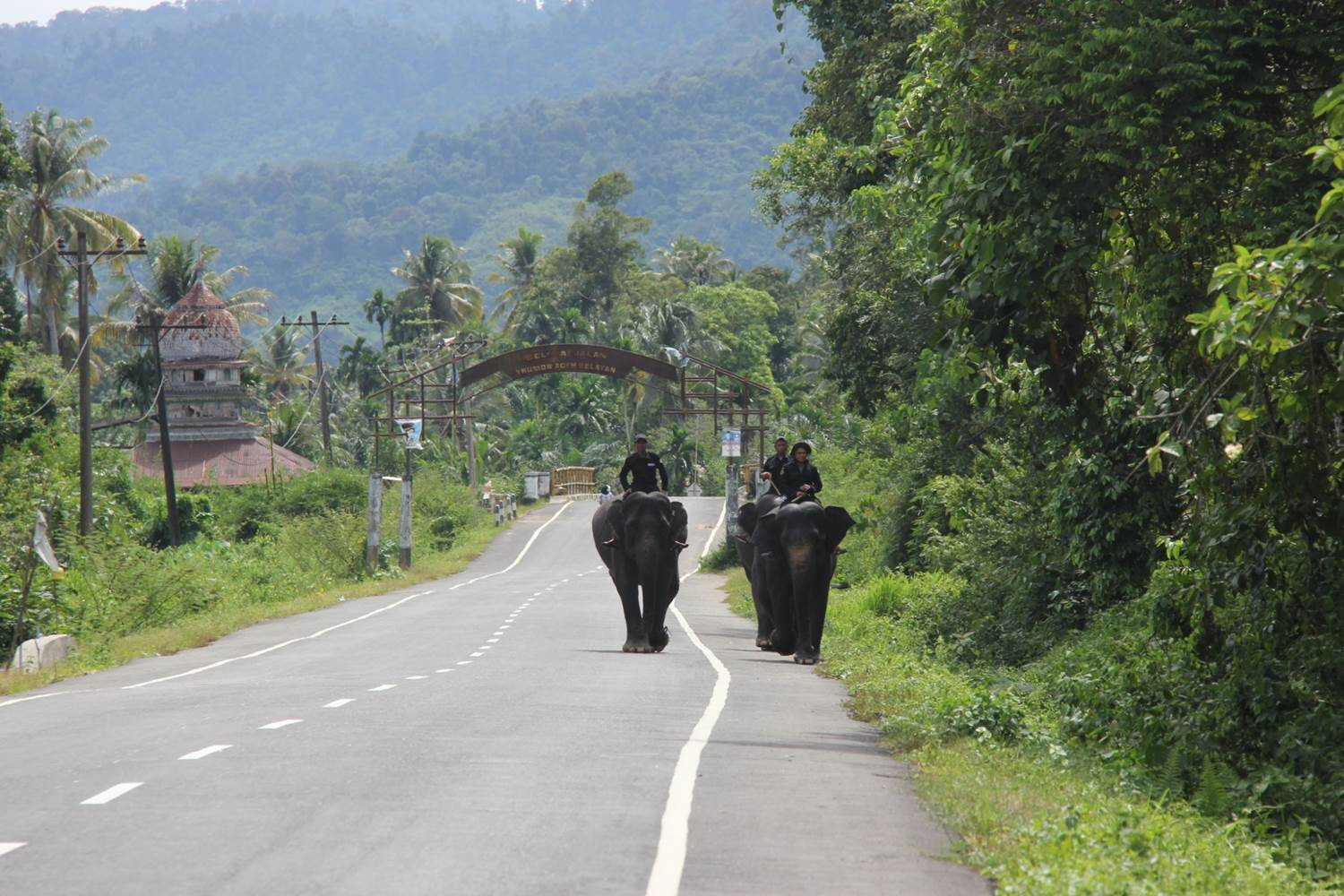
- Forest rangers patrol on elephants in the Trumon Corridor area
- Interactive map of Trumon
- Location within Aceh Location within Northern Sumatra Location within Indonesia
- Coordinates: 2°42′00″N 97°43′00″E
- Country: Indonesia
- Province: Aceh
- Regency: South Aceh

Area
  - Total: 765.92 km^{2} (295.72 sq mi)

Population (2024)
  - Total: 6,895
  - Density: 9.002/km^{2} (23.32/sq mi)

Trumon is a district in South Aceh Regency, Aceh, Indonesia.

== History ==
Trumon has a close relationship with the Trumon Kingdom, which is estimated to have been established in the 16th century. This kingdom is one of the small kingdoms in Aceh that has an important role in trade and diplomatic relations, especially through small ports on the coast of its territory. The Trumon Kingdom is known as part of a network of kingdoms in Aceh that supported the Sultanate of Aceh Darussalam.

The legacy of the Trumon Kingdom is still part of the identity of the local community. Traditions, customs, and history of the kingdom are passed down through folklore and cultural relics, such as the tombs of kings and other historical sites. The Trumon Kingdom is a symbol of pride for the people of Trumon District, who continue to preserve the cultural and historical values that are inherited.
