= Legundi Island =

Island in Indonesia

Coordinates: 5°49′37″S 105°16′22″E

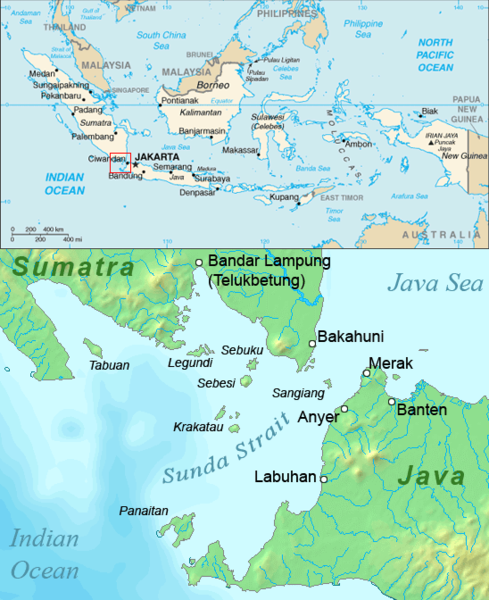
Map of greater area of Java and Pulau with Sunda Strait below

Pulau Legundi (also spelled Lagoendi) is an Indonesian island in the Sunda Strait between Java and Sumatra. It is one of the larger islands in the Strait and lies at the western end of Sumatra's Lampong Bay, in the province of Lampung.

== Population & Surroundings ==
Although it's not so far from the mainland, Legundi is sparsely populated with about 80 inhabitants per square kilometer. Due to it being lowly populated, agricultural cultivation has never been practiced on a large scale, which has kept intact the island's natural evergreen and semi-deciduous forests. Tabuan Island is 40 kilometres (25 mi) to the west.

== Environment ==
Due to the island's tropical nature and close proximity to the equator, seasons are not so distinct and temperatures are not so fluctuating. October tends to be both the wettest and warmest month at around 32°C, with the driest and coldest month being June at around 20°C.
