= Pasaran =

Island in Indonesia

Coordinates: 5°27′50.3″S 105°15′53.6″E

The pasaran is also a cycle in the Javanese calendar.

Pasaran is a reclaimed island in the province of Lampung, Indonesia. The island is about 1 km from the provincial capital, Bandar Lampung and is administratively part of the city. It has an area of approximately 11.73 hectares and a population of about 600 in 250 households.
