= Sunda Strait =

Strait between the Indonesian islands of Java and Sumatra

- Selat Sunda (Indonesian)
- Location within Indonesia

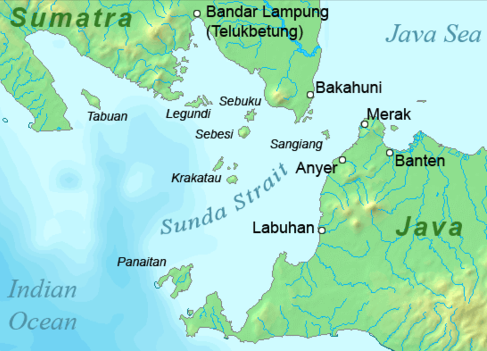
- Coordinates: 5°55′S 105°53′E
- Type: Strait
- Etymology: Sunda Kingdom
- Part of: Java Sea
- Basin countries: Indonesia
- Min. width: 24 km (15 mi)
- Average depth: −20 m (−66 ft)

The Sunda Strait (Indonesian: Selat Sunda) is the strait between the Indonesian islands of Java and Sumatra. It connects the Java Sea with the Indian Ocean.

== Etymology ==
The strait takes its name from the Sunda Kingdom, which ruled the western portion of Java (an area covering the present day West Java, Jakarta, Banten, and some of western Central Java) from 669 to around 1579.

The name also alludes to the Sundanese people native to West Java and Banten.

== Geography ==
Sunda Strait with Anak Krakatau eruption, Sept. 6, 2026

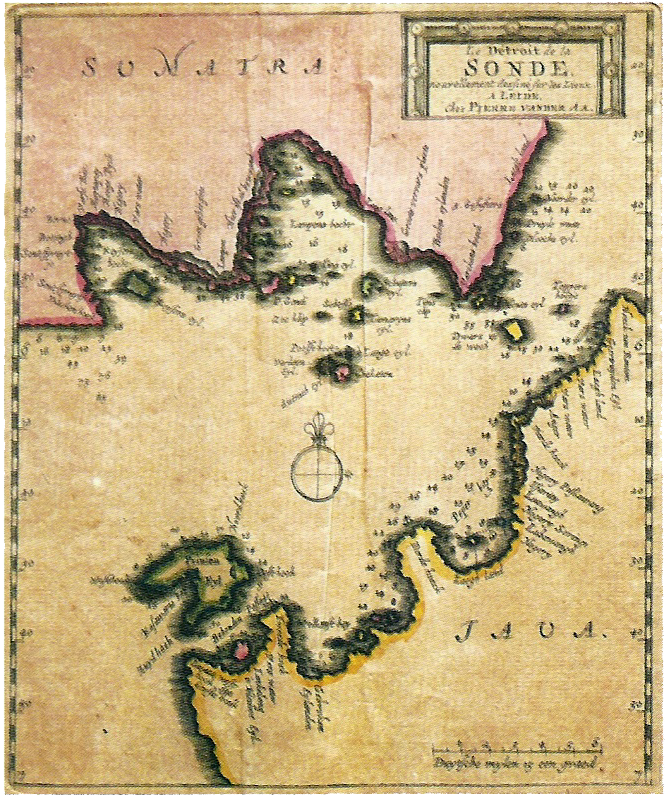
Map of the Sunda Strait in 1729 by Pierre van der Aa

Extending in a roughly southwest/northeast orientation, with a minimum width of 24 km (15 mi) at its northeastern end between Cape Tua on Sumatra and Cape Pujat on Java, the strait is part of the Java Sea. It is essentially triangular in shape, with two large bays on its northern side. It is also very broad and deep at its southwestern end, but as it narrows to the northeast it becomes much shallower, with a minimum depth of only 20 m (66 ft) in parts of its northeastern end.

The strait is notoriously difficult to navigate because of this shallowness, very strong tidal currents, sandbanks, and man-made obstructions such as oil platforms off the Java coast.

For centuries, the strait was an important shipping route, especially during the period when the Dutch East India Company used it as the gateway to the Spice Islands of Indonesia (1602–1799). However, its narrowness, shallowness, and lack of accurate charting make it unsuitable for many modern, large ships, most of which use the Strait of Malacca instead.

The strait is dotted with a number of islands, many of which are volcanic in origin. They include: Sangiang (Thwart-the-Way), Sebesi, Sebuku, and Panaitan (Prince's). The 1883 eruption of Krakatau, one of these islands, had a profound effect on the area, both short and long term. Tsunamis and pyroclastic flows which floated on clouds of steam killed tens of thousands. Out of 3,000 people on nearby Sebesi at the time, not one survived. Some land was never resettled and became Ujung Kulon National Park.

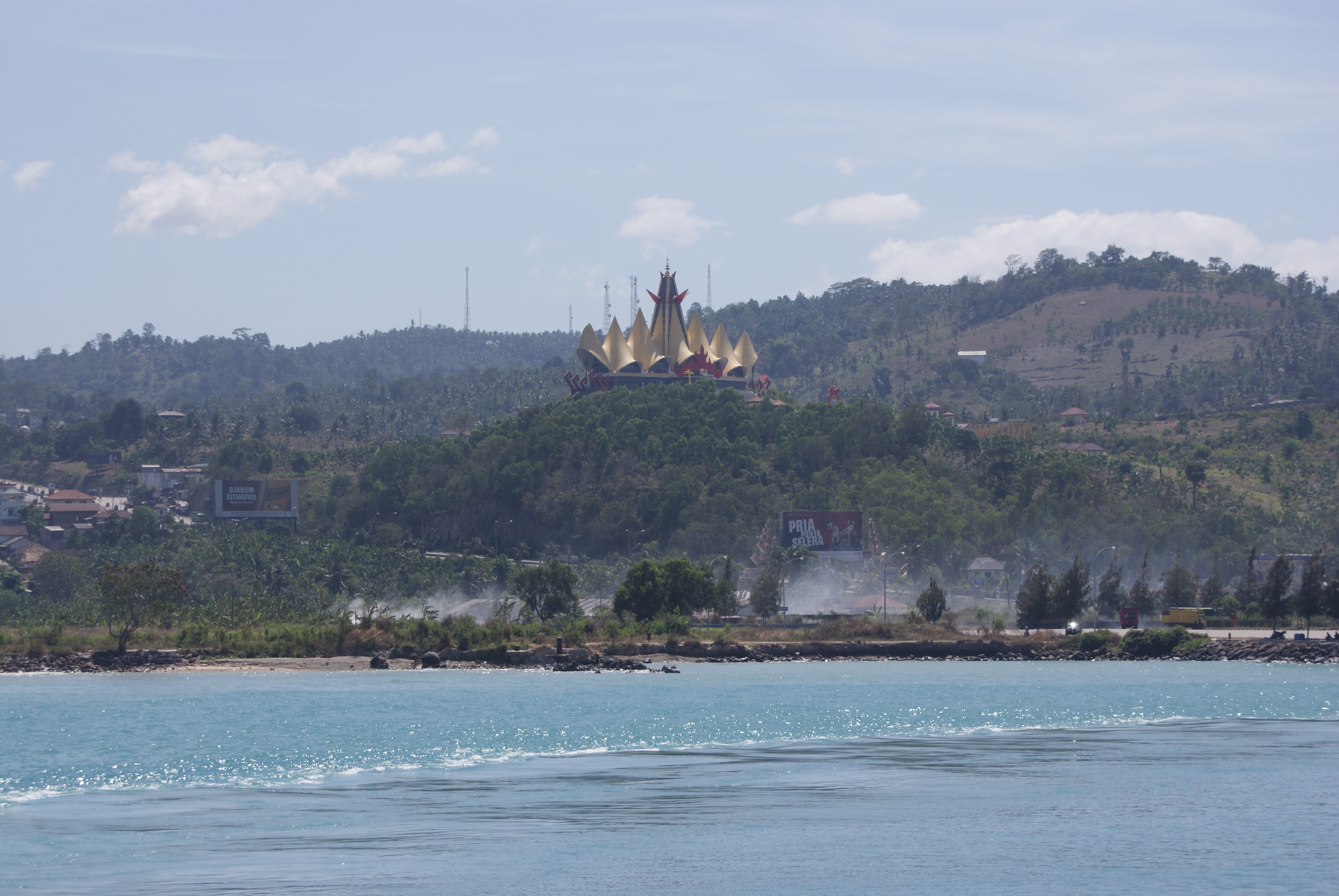
Siger Tower, Bakauheni, Sumatra, at the strait's northeastern entrance

The Krakatoa eruption drastically altered the topography of the strait, with as much as 18–21 km^{3} of ignimbrite being deposited over an area of 1.1 million km^{2} around the volcano. However, the population has recovered and much of the coastline is now very densely populated. Aside from Krakatoa's sole remaining peak, Rakata, the Krakatoa Archipelago consists of the islands of Lang (Panjang or Rakata Kecil), Verlaten (Sertung), and most recently, Anak Krakatau, which emerged in 1927 from the original Krakatoa's shattered remains.

== Conservation ==
The Sunda Strait lies within Indonesia’s Fisheries Management Area 572 (WPP 572), which has been identified as the focus of the Blue Halo S pilot involving Konservasi Indonesia.

== Battle of Sunda Strait ==
On March 1, 1942, the Battle of Sunda Strait—part of the larger Battle of the Java Sea—took place when the Allied cruisers HMAS Perth and USS Houston encountered a Japanese amphibious landing force near Bantam, commanded by Rear Admiral Kenzaburo Hara. That force included a light cruiser and eleven destroyers, four heavy cruisers and a light aircraft carrier. The two Allied cruisers were sunk, while a Japanese minesweeper and a transport vessel were sunk by friendly fire.

== Planned bridge ==
In the 1960s, proposals were made for a bridge across the Sunda Strait, and in the 1990s further bridge suggestions arose. A new plan was announced in October 2007. It would use the islands of Ular, Sangiang and Prajurit to create a four-part suspension bridge reaching 70 metres (230 ft) above sea level. This bridge would have a maximum span of 3 kilometers, around 50% longer than the current record holder, the 1915 Çanakkale Bridge. Construction was projected to begin in 2014 if funding of at least US$10 billion could be secured.

An accord was signed in April 2012 with China Railway Construction Corporation for an $11 billion road and double track rail bridge. However, in November 2014 the incoming government of President Joko Widodo shelved plans to build the bridge.

== Islands in the strait ==
- Calmeyer
- Krakatau Archipelago
  - Krakatau, mostly destroyed volcanic island
    - Anak Krakatau, active volcano
    - Danan (volcano), destroyed volcanic cone on Krakatau
    - Perboewatan, destroyed volcanic cone on Krakatau
    - Rakata, partially destroyed volcanic cone and remnant of original island
  - Poolsche Hoed, destroyed in 1883 eruption of Krakatoa
  - Panjang, or Rakata Ketjil (Lang)
  - Sertung (Verlaten)
- Legundi
- Panaitan (Prince's Island)
- Peucang
- Handeuleum
- Sangiang (Thwart-the-way)
- Sebesi
- Sebuku
- Steers (island)
- Tabuan

=== Bays ===
- Lampung Bay, Sumatra
- Semangka Bay, Sumatra

== Gallery of nearby important channels ==
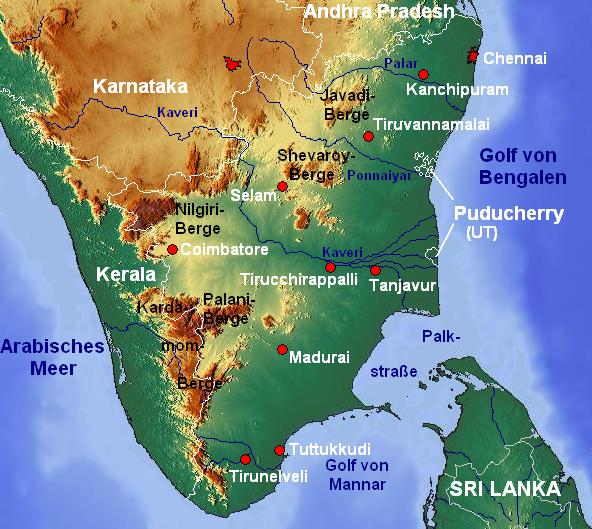
Gulf of Mannar

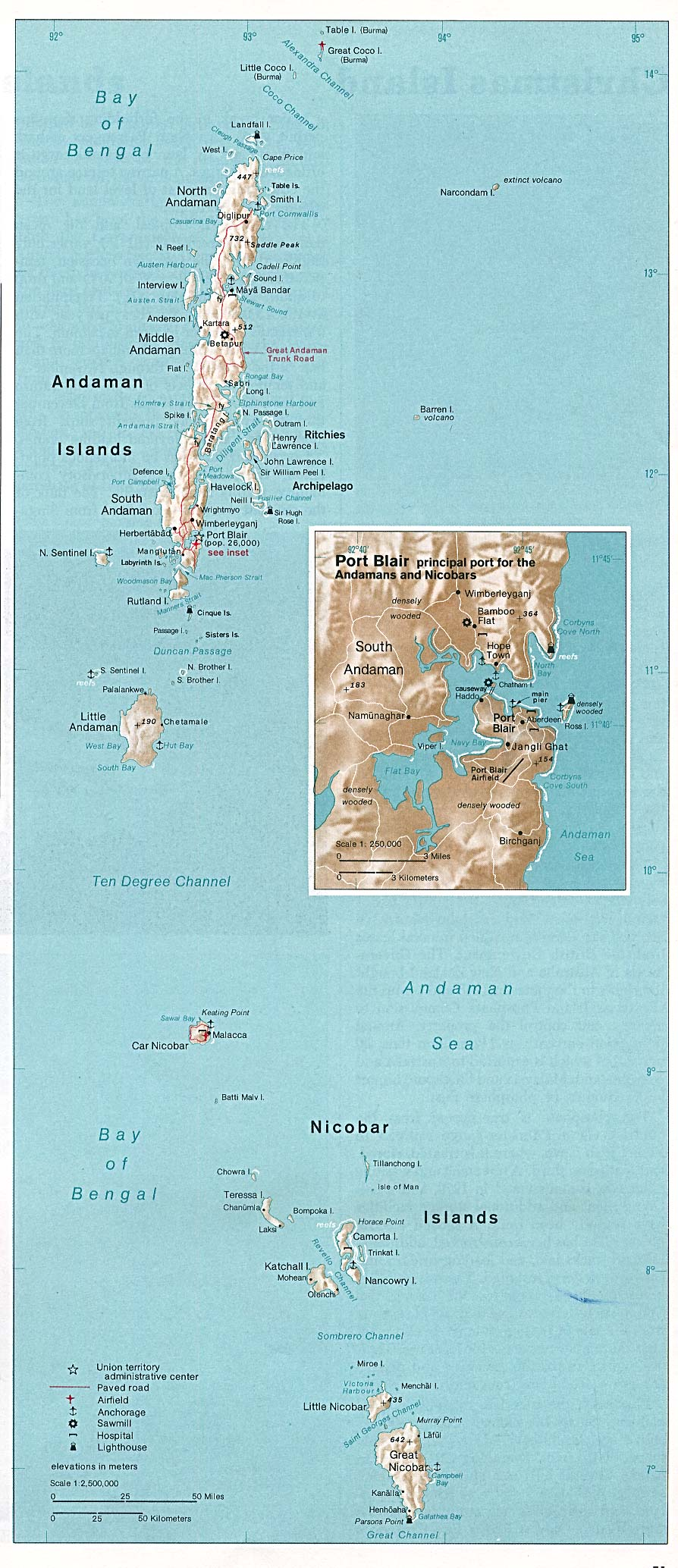
Cocos Strait, Duncan Passage and other Indian channels

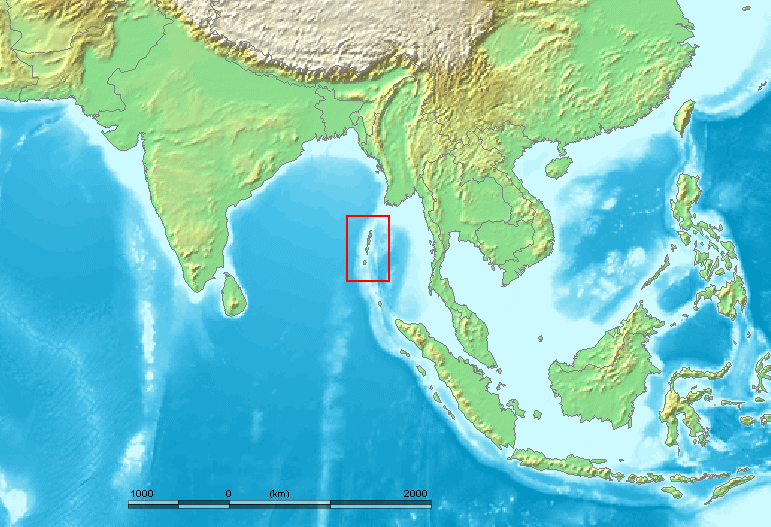
Cocos Strait is at the northern end of Andaman Islands in red square

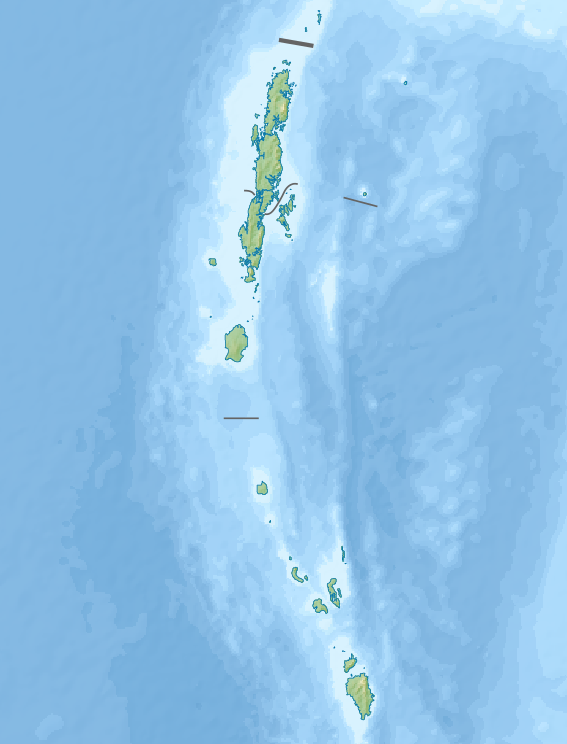
Ten Degrees Channel

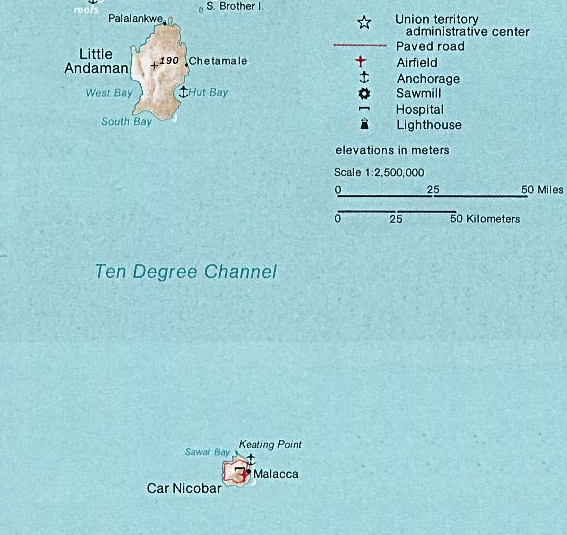
Ten Degrees Channel, closeup

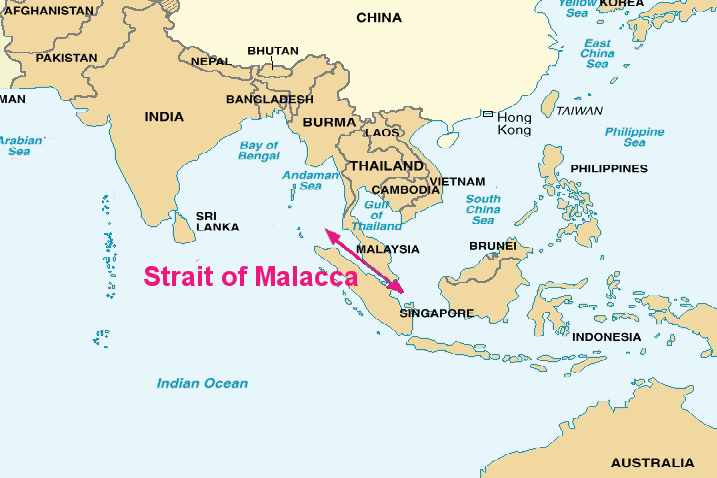
Malacca Strait

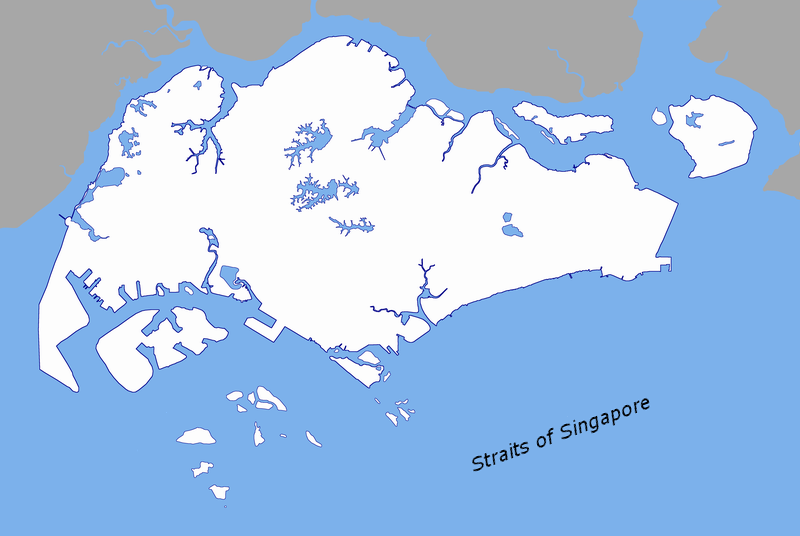
Singapore Strait

Sunda Strait

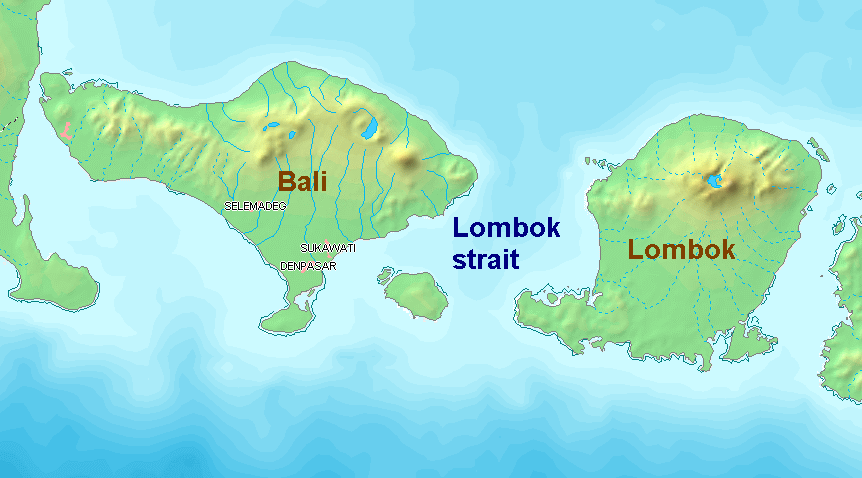
Lombok Strait

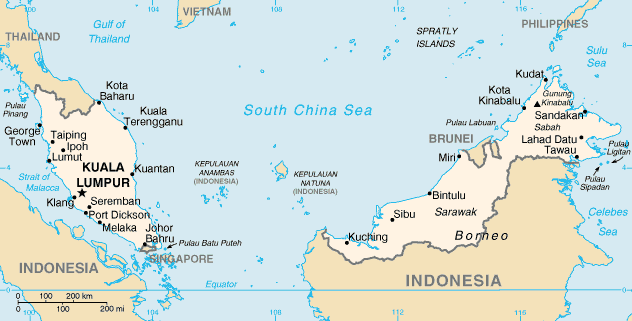
South China Sea, Malacca Strait, Gulf of Thailand, Sulu Sea, Celebes Sea

== See also ==
Geostrategic context

- Andaman and Nicobar Command
- Andaman Sea
- Bay of Bengal
- Exclusive economic zone of Indonesia
- Exclusive economic zone of India

Local context

- Sunda Straits Crisis
- Java Head
- Kra Canal
- Lombok Strait
- Makassar Strait
- Malaccamax
- List of road-rail bridges
- 2018 Sunda Strait tsunami
