= Sebesi =

Island in the Sunda Strait

Coordinates: 5.945°S 105.489°E

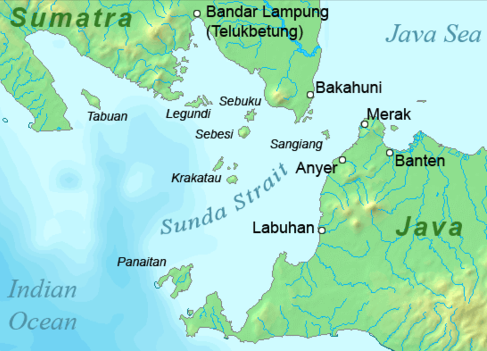
Map of Sebesi relative to Krakatoa in the Sunda Strait

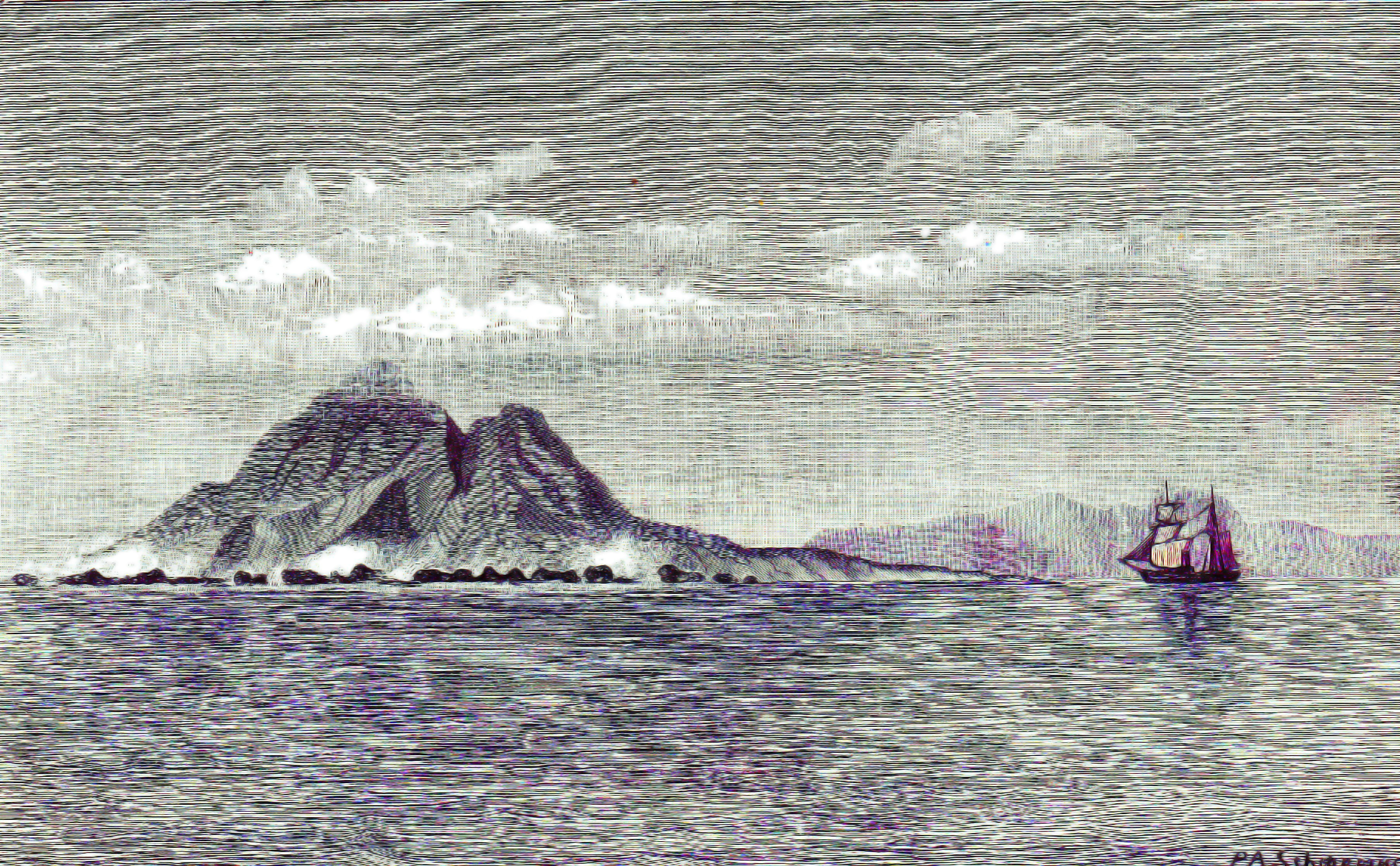
A lithograph of Sebesi in 1883

Sebesi (also Sebeezee, or 'Bleezie') is an Indonesian island in the Sunda Strait, between Java and Sumatra, and part of the province of Lampung. It rises to a height of 844 metres (2,769 ft) and lies about 12 kilometres (7.5 mi) north of the Krakatoa Archipelago; it is the closest large island to Krakatoa, about the same area and height as the remnant of Rakata. Like Krakatoa, it too is volcanic, although no dated eruptions are known. (A single report of an eruption in 1680 seems to be a confusion with the Krakatoa eruption reported from that year.) Unlike the Krakatoa Archipelago, Sebesi has permanent streams and is inhabited. Habitation is concentrated most heavily on the northern and eastern coasts of the island.

Sebesi was devastated by the 1883 volcanic eruption of Krakatoa. Official records give approximately 3,000 people killed, with 1,000 of these being 'non-residents'.

By 1890, Sebesi was being re-cleared. It is believed that since it lies closer to Sumatra, it has served as a 'stepping stone' for much of the flora and fauna which was re-established on Krakatoa. By the 1920s, settlers had returned, and today the island is almost wholly cultivated land, with only a small area at the top of Sebesi peak and some mangrove swamps still in a natural state.

In December 2018, an eruption of Mount Anak Krakatau triggered a tsunami that hit the coastal areas of the island, as well as several smaller islands nearby.
