= Semangka Bay =

- Teluk Semangka (Indonesian)
- Location within Sumatra
- Location: Southeast Asia
- Coordinates: 5°36′00″S 104°42′00″E
- Type: Bay
- Basin countries: Indonesia
- References: Teluk Semangka: Indonesia National Geospatial-Intelligence Agency, Bethesda, MD, USA

Semangka Bay (Indonesian: Teluk Semangka) is a large bay located on the southern tip of Sumatra Island, in the province of Lampung. At the southern tip of Sumatra there are two large bays, Teluk Semangka is located in the western part. The bay had been used as a trade route on 15th century to 17th century.

On the east side of the bay stretches Tanggamus Regency, with the capital city of Kotaagung located at the northern end of the bay.
