= Upset (competition) =

Unexpected result in competition

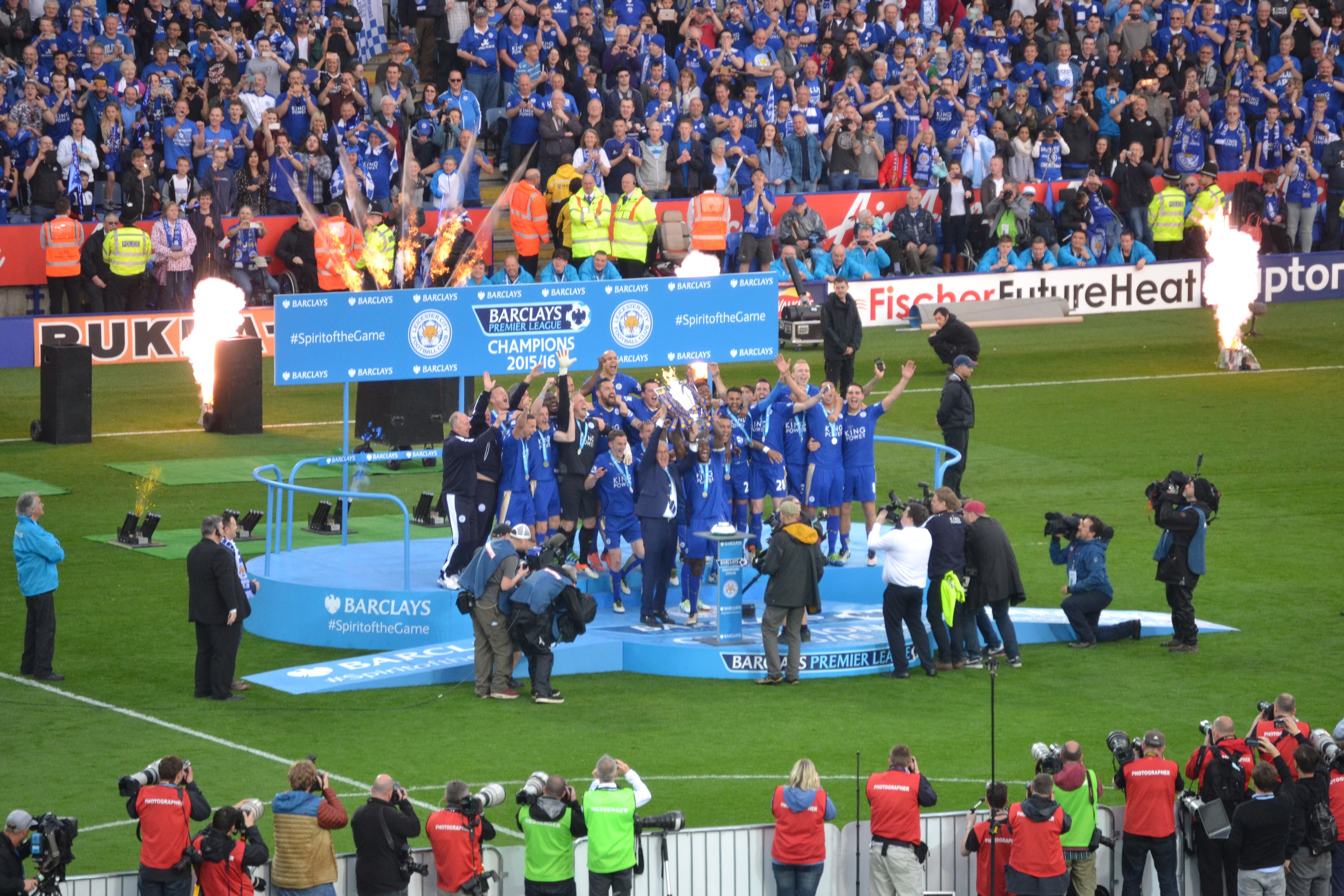
Leicester City F.C., an association football club, won the Premier League in the 2015–16 season despite being 5000/1 underdogs, an example of an upset.

An upset occurs in a competition, frequently in electoral politics or sports, when the party popularly expected to win (the "favorite") is defeated by (or, in the case of sports, ties with) an underdog whom the majority expects to lose, defying the conventional wisdom. It is often used in reference to beating the betting odds in sports, or beating the opinion polls in electoral politics.

== Origin ==
The meaning of the word "upset" has long included "an overthrowing or overturn of ideas, plans, etc." (see OED definition 6b), from which the sports definition almost surely derived. "Upset" also once referred to "a curved part of a bridle-bit, fitting over the tongue of the horse", (now the port of a curb bit), but even though the modern sports meaning of "upset" was first used far more for horse races than for any other competition, there is no evidence of a connection.

In 2002, George Thompson, a lexicographic researcher, used the full-text online search capabilities of The New York Times databases to trace the usage of the verb to upset and the noun upset. The latter was seen in usage as early as 1877.

== Examples of upsets ==
=== Sports ===
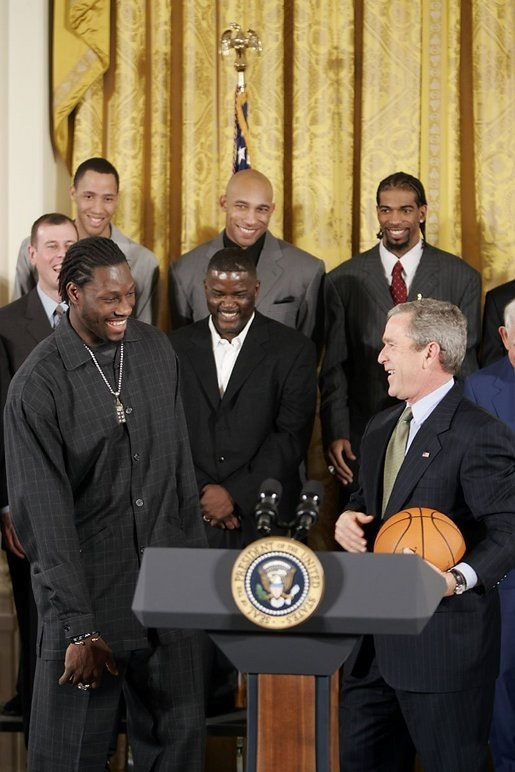
The 2004 Detroit Pistons were considered underdogs due to the team entering the 2004 NBA Finals without a single NBA All-Star on their roster. The Pistons defeated a Los Angeles Lakers team that was heavily favored in the series. It remains one of the biggest upsets in NBA history.

Below is a selection of major upsets from a variety of popular sports around the world. It is not meant to be comprehensive, merely representative.

==== American football ====
- Heading into the 2007 college football season, the Michigan Wolverines were ranked as the pre-season Number 5 team, and among the favorites for that year's BCS National Championship. As an early season tune-up game, Michigan had booked the lower division Appalachian State Mountaineers for their first game of the season. The Mountaineers surprised the football world by leading 28–17 at the half. Though Michigan clawed their way back to lead 32–31 late into the fourth quarter, the Mountaineers kicked a field goal with 26 seconds left in the game to take the lead 34–32. Michigan managed to use only 20 seconds of game time to drive the ball down to the App State 27-yard line, and as time was expiring the Mountaineers' Corey Lynch blocked a Michigan field goal attempt to secure the upset for App State. The game marked only the second time, to that point, that a lower-division school had beaten a top-division AP-ranked team.
- Howard University, a FCS team, entered as a 45-point road underdog against UNLV and stunned the Rebels 43–40 in Las Vegas. By point-spread standards, Howard pulled off the biggest upset in modern college football history.
- In Super Bowl III, the senior National Football League was playing their third interleague championship game against the upstart American Football League. The NFL had won the prior two matchups without much difficulty, and it looked poised to do so again, as the Baltimore Colts, with a 13–1 record, behind quarterback Earl Morrall, who led the league in touchdown passes that season and was named NFL Most Valuable Player. The team also had several future Hall of Fame players on the roster, including quarterback Johnny Unitas, relegated to a back-up role following an early-season injury, tight end John Mackey, as well as a defense led by perennial all-pro Bubba Smith. The New York Jets were led by Joe Namath at quarterback, who earlier in the week had "guaranteed" victory against the Colts. Namath's top target, future Hall of Fame wide receiver Don Maynard, was hobbled by an injury, but Namath led the Jets on a run-focused attack that leaned heavily on fullback Matt Snell, who ran for 121 yards and scored the Jets' only touchdown. The Jets defense confounded Morrall, who had only six completions on 17 attempts, with three interceptions in the first half, including an interception to the Jets' Jim Hudson while Colts' star receiver Jimmy Orr, uncovered near the end zone, waved his hands to no avail. Colts' head coach Don Shula put the hobbled Unitas in the game in the second half, and despite a late game touchdown, lost the game 16–7.

==== Association football ====
- The English FA Cup – a knockout tournament which is randomly drawn for each round – is mythologised for frequent occurrences of "giant-killing"; on occasion, "non-League" teams (i.e. teams not in the top four tiers of the league system) have even beaten teams in the Premier League, or its predecessor, the First Division. As of January 2026, the largest upset in terms of league position was the National League North's Macclesfield defeating the Premier League team and title holders Crystal Palace 2–1 in the third round of the 2025–26 FA Cup; the teams were separated by five leagues and 117 league positions at the time of the match. Seven second-tier teams have won the FA Cup since the founding of the Football League in 1888, the most recent being West Ham United in 1980. One non-league team, Tottenham Hotspur in 1901, has also won the FA Cup during this time.
- Leicester City F.C., an English football club, were crowned champions of the 2015–16 Premier League. The club had narrowly avoided the relegation the previous season by finishing 14th and being in the bottom of the table the most part of the season. At the beginning of the season, bookmakers had given Leicester City odds of 5000/1 against them winning the league. It was the first English title in their history.
- In the first leg of the Spanish 2009–10 Copa del Rey, AD Alcorcón won over Real Madrid 4–0 in an upset later named the Alcorconazo. Real Madrid is one of the largest clubs in the world while the Alcorcón team played in the third-tier Segunda División B. Because Real Madrid won the second leg only 1–0, Alcorcón advanced victorious to the next round.

==== Baseball ====
- The 1906 World Series looked to be one of the most lopsided matchups in World Series history, as the National League powerhouse Chicago Cubs, with a record of 116–36, represented the best winning percentage in modern Major League Baseball history. They faced off against their cross-town rivals, the Chicago White Sox, who finished with the American League pennant having a record of 93–58. The White Sox were dubbed the "hitless wonders" as their .230 team batting average was not only the worst batting average by a team to win their league pennant, it was the worst overall batting average in all of Major League Baseball that season. Buoyed by a pitching staff that held the Cubs to a below .200 batting average for the series, the White Sox showed an uncharacteristic surge of batting prowess in games 5 and 6 with 16 runs on 26 hits over the two games to claim the World Series crown four games to two in what has been called the biggest upset in MLB history.

==== Basketball ====
- In the 1985 NCAA Division I men's basketball tournament, the Georgetown Hoyas had won the previous national championship, and looked poised to win their second straight, as they entered the 1985 national championship as the defending national champion with the Number 1 overall seed, as well as the Number 1 seed in the East Region, posting a record of 35–2, including a Big East tournament title. Their opponent and Big East rival, the Number 8 seed Villanova Wildcats, entered the national championship with a 24–10 record. Villanova defeated Georgetown, 66–64, in what has been considered one of the biggest upsets in NCAA Division I men's basketball tournament history. As of 2022, this is the only time an 8th-seeded team has won the NCAA tournament and the 1984–85 Villanova team remains the lowest-seeded team to win the NCAA tournament.
- The Stanford Cardinal entered the 1998 NCAA Division I women's basketball tournament with the Number 1 seed in the West Region, posting a record of 21–5, including a Pac-10 regular season title. Their opponent, the Number 16 seed Harvard Crimson, entered the tournament with a 22–4 record and an Ivy League regular season title. Before this match, no Number 1 seed had ever fallen to a Number 16 seed since the field expanded to 64 teams in 1994. Harvard defeated Stanford, 71–67, in what has been considered the biggest upset in NCAA Division I women's basketball tournament history. 20 years later, a Number 16 seed had beaten a Number 1 seed in men's tournament (see below).
- The Virginia Cavaliers entered the 2018 NCAA Division I men's basketball tournament with the Number 1 overall seed, as well as the Number 1 seed in the South Region, posting a record of 31–2, including both an ACC regular season title and ACC tournament title. Their opponent, Number 16 seed UMBC, entered the tournament with a 24–10 record and an America East tournament title. Before this match, no Number 1 seed had ever fallen to a Number 16 seed since the field expanded to 64 teams in 1985. UMBC defeated Virginia, 74–54, in what has been considered the biggest upset in NCAA Tournament history.
- The Purdue Boilermakers entered the 2023 NCAA Division I men's basketball tournament with the Number 1 seed in the East Region, posting a record of 29–5, including both a Big Ten regular season and tournament title. Their opponent, Number 16 seed Fairleigh Dickinson Knights, entered the tournament with a 20–15 record after an 84–61 win over Texas Southern in the First Four. Despite a 67–66 loss in the Northeast Conference tournament championship game to the NEC regular season champion Merrimack Warriors, Fairleigh Dickinson received an automatic bid to the NCAA tournament as the NEC tournament runners-up, while the NEC tournament champion Merrimack was ineligible for the NCAA tournament due to a 4-year transition from Division II. Closed as 23.5-point underdogs, Fairleigh Dickinson shocked Purdue 63–58 to become the second Number 16 seed to beat a Number 1 seed in NCAA Division I men's basketball tournament history.
- Entering the first round of the 2007 NBA Playoffs, the Dallas Mavericks had the best record in all of NBA at 67–15, six games up on second place, while their first round opponent, the Golden State Warriors, had a 42–40 record and had only qualified for the tournament on the last day of the regular season, having needed to win all of their last five games just to qualify. Dallas was captained by power forward Dirk Nowitzki, who was in the midst of a Hall-of-Fame career that would feature 14 all star appearances, and supported by other star players such as Jason Terry, Jerry Stackhouse, Devin Harris, and Josh Howard. Golden State had completely revamped their team mid-season, including two starters (Stephen Jackson and Al Harrington), who arrived in January in a blockbuster 8-player deal with the Indiana Pacers. Baron Davis was the unquestioned star of the playoff run, as he dominated the Mavericks, averaging 25.3 points, 6.5 assists, and 2.9 steals per game, as the Warriors would knock off the Mavericks four games to two.
- Entering the second round of the 2020 NBA Playoffs, the Los Angeles Clippers, under the guidance by championship head coach Doc Rivers, were widely regarded as frontrunners for the championship. Armed with star talents like Kawhi Leonard, who came off a championship win with the Toronto Raptors, and Paul George, a previous MVP candidate and first-team All-Defensive player, and defensive guard Patrick Beverley, the Clippers had high expectations. Their deep bench, featuring Montrezl Harrell and Lou Williams, added to their championship aspirations, while their strong defensive prowess further solidified their position. However, the Denver Nuggets, guided by the dynamic duo of Jamal Murray and Nikola Jokić, emerged as formidable challengers. Murray's explosive scoring prowess, highlighted by a remarkable 40-point performance in Game 7, combined with Jokić's extraordinary playmaking and versatility as a center, were instrumental in fueling the Nuggets' remarkable comeback. This unforeseen development showcased the Nuggets' remarkable resilience and their strategic acumen in exploiting the Clippers' defensive weaknesses. In contrast, the Clippers' star players faltered significantly in the crucial Game 7, with Leonard managing only 14 points and a 6-of-22 shooting performance, and George contributing a mere 10 points at a shooting efficiency of 25%, including a notable miss that hit the side of the backboard during a 3-point attempt. Notably, both stars were unable to score in the 4th quarter. This series of events culminated in a stunning reversal, as the Clippers lost their dominant 3–1 series lead, becoming the 12th team in NBA history to do so. The Nuggets, driven by the exceptional performances of Murray and Jokić, clinched a victory in what became one of the most unexpected and memorable upsets in recent NBA playoff history.

==== Boxing ====
- Mike Tyson vs. Buster Douglas: Undisputed heavyweight champion Mike Tyson lost his belt to Buster Douglas despite being the 42 to 1 favorite; it was the first loss of Tyson's career.

==== Cricket ====
- In the 1983 Cricket World Cup, the third edition of the tournament, the West Indies cricket team had won both of the previous two World Cups and looked poised to win their third. Their opponent in the finals, India, had never made it out of the group stage before 1983. India went to bat first, and managed 183 before being dismissed with five overs left. West Indies star batsman, Viv Richards, hit a hook towards the leg-side boundary, where Indian captain Kapil Dev made a running catch to get out the West Indies best batsman. Among the remaining batsman, only Jeff Dujon managed more than 20 runs, and West Indies were bowled out at 140, giving India their first World Cup.

==== Ice hockey ====
- Entering the medal round of the 1980 Winter Olympics, the Soviet Union had won four consecutive gold medals of the previous four Winter Olympics and were heavily favored to win another gold medal. Their opponent, the United States, consisted entirely of collegiate and amateur players and under head coach Herb Brooks, had finished second in Blue Division behind Sweden (based on goal difference) and qualified for the medal round. The U.S. pulled off a 4–3 upset over the Soviets, in what has since become known as the "Miracle on Ice". After that loss, the Soviets pummeled Sweden to settle for silver, while the U.S. went on to win gold after defeating Finland.
- Entering the first round of the 2019 Stanley Cup playoffs, the Tampa Bay Lightning earned the Presidents' Trophy as the NHL's best regular season team with a 62–16–4 record (128 points), while their first round opponent, the Columbus Blue Jackets, had a 47–31–4 record (98 points), had qualified for the playoffs for the third straight year and earned the second wild card spot in the Eastern Conference. The Blue Jackets swept the Lightning in four games and won the playoff series for the first time in franchise history, in what has been considered the biggest upset in Stanley Cup playoffs history. This marks the first time in Stanley Cup playoffs history that the Presidents' Trophy winners were swept in the opening round.
- Entering the 2023 Stanley Cup playoffs, the Boston Bruins had set new NHL records for single-season wins and points, finishing with a 65–12–5 record (135 points), and earning the President's Trophy. By contrast, their first round opponent, the Florida Panthers, had narrowly qualified for the playoffs, finishing with a 42–32–8 record (92 points), and clinching an Eastern Conference wild card berth one day after their penultimate regular-season game. The Panthers defeated the Bruins in seven games, rallying from a 3–1 series deficit and winning three straight games to eliminate Boston; additionally, the team advanced to the second round of the playoffs for just the third time in franchise history. The 43-point difference between the two teams represented the largest upset by standings position of any best-of-seven playoff series in NHL history.
- Entering the 2025 IIHF World Championship playoff round, 1-seed and 28-time champion Canada was the strongest team in the tournament, and was favored to make the final round. Their quarterfinals opponent, 7-seed Denmark, had never made the semifinals of the World Championships, additionally never finishing higher than 8th place overall. After a 0–0 tie for the majority of the game, Travis Sanheim scored just after the 47-minute mark to give Canada a 1–0 lead. Denmark subsequently scored two goals in the final three minutes of the game, with Nikolaj Ehlers tying the game at 1 just before the 58-minute mark, and Nick Olesen scoring with 49 seconds left to give Denmark a 2–1 lead and ultimately the victory. Owing to Canada's dynastic status in international ice hockey, and Denmark's comparatively minimal level of success, the game was considered one of the largest upsets in ice hockey history.

==== Mixed Martial Arts ====
- UFC Freedom 250: Undisputed lightweight champion Ilia Topuria lost his belt and his undefeated status to Justin Gaethje at UFC Freedom 250 despite the odds being Ilia Topuria: -500 (favorite) Justin Gaethje: +400 (underdog); this was the first loss of Topuria's career.

==== Rugby league ====
- In the 1995 State of Origin series the Queensland Maroons were underdogs having lost the previous 3 State of Origin series to New South Wales Rugby League team. Additionally both teams were impacted by the Super League War, with the governing body ARL ruling players ineligible if they were signed to Super League aligned clubs. The Maroons won the best of 3 series 3–0 under the coaching of rookie coach Paul Vautin.
- In the 2008 Rugby League World Cup the New Zealand Kiwis beat the Australian Kangaroos in the final hosted at Australia's Lang Park, Queensland. It was Australia's first loss in two years and their first loss to New Zealand in three years. Australia had won the previous six Rugby League World Cup's dating back to 1975.

==== Skiing ====
- Ester Ledecká won the gold medal in super-G alpine skiing at the 2018 Winter Olympics, after finishing 0.01 seconds ahead of the 2014 Olympics defending gold medalist Anna Veith, who had already been proclaimed the winner by many media outlets. Ledecká was ranked 49th in the event before the Olympics and had never medalled in any World Cup level international skiing event.

=== Politics ===
Below is a list of elections which have extensively been described as upsets by a number of major media sources. It is not meant to be comprehensive, merely representative.

==== Argentina ====
- 2023 Argentine primary elections: presidential candidate Javier Milei of La Libertad Avanza (LLA) finished as the most voted candidate in the election. Opinion polling for the 2023 Argentine general election had predicted that Sergio Massa of the Union for the Homeland (UP) led by the Justicialist Party (PJ) would be the most voted candidate and Juntos por el Cambio (JxC) the most voted coalition overall. It was the first time that a right wing candidate won the primary elections since the 1916 Argentine general election; since then, all presidents of Argentina were either from the Radical Civic Union (UCR) or derivates, the Justicialists, or JxC.

==== Australia ====
- 1993 federal election: the ruling 10-year old Labor government of Prime Minister Paul Keating won a fifth consecutive term in office, despite trailing the opposition Liberal-National Coalition during the election campaign.
- 1999 Victorian state election: Jeff Kennett's Liberal–National Coalition government entered the campaign with a substantial lead in the polls and was widely expected to win a third term, some commentators even tipped the government to increase their already large majority.However, a substantial swing to Labor in provincial and rural Victoria, traditionally a Liberal stronghold, resulted in the Kennett government losing its majority and Labor subsequently forming a minority government. Political analyst and ABC commentator Antony Green later wrote that "in the more than 35 elections I've been involved in, the 1999 Victorian election was the only one where I thought there was something wrong with the computer", and the new Labor premier Steve Bracks even remarked 'I hope it's right, but I think The Australian is on drugs.' in response to a poll by The Australian which suggested the result would be a cliffhanger.
- 2015 Queensland state election: Three years after the electorate voted out the Anna Bligh's Labor state government in favour of the Liberal National Party (LNP) under Campbell Newman in a massive landslide, reducing Labor to just 7 seats in the 89 seat state parliament, Labor returned to power on a massive swing that also saw Newman lose his own seat, forming a minority government. The LNP lead in the opinion polls and the overwhelming size of the LNP majority made it appear that its defeat was extremely unlikely.
- 2019 federal election: the ruling Liberal-National Coalition won an absolute majority of 77 out of the 151 seats in the House of Representatives, despite trailing the opposition Labor Party in opinion polls for almost three years.
- 2025 federal election: Anthony Albanese's Labor government won a second term by a landslide, in the party's second-best ever result in Australian history, despite the polls showing a tight race in the lead up to the election amidst wide expectations that there would be a hung parliament. Peter Dutton, leader of the Liberal-National Coalition, unexpectedly lost his seat to Labor candidate Ali France, making him the first federal opposition leader in Australian history to lose their seat while serving in the role. The Greens, also unexpectedly, lost 3 out of 4 existing lower house seats they held, including its leader, Adam Bandt.

==== Brazil ====
- 2026 Brazilian presidential election: Incumbent President Luiz Inácio Lula da Silva won a historic fourth term defeating Flávio Bolsonaro after losing the first round. Lula's victory in the second round made it the first time since the return of democracy in Brazil that the runner-up of the first round would win the second.

==== Canada ====
- 2013 British Columbia general election: The incumbent British Columbia Liberal Party won a fourth straight majority, by slightly larger margins than in the 2009 election, despite trailing the opposition New Democrats by multiple percentage points in every public opinion poll throughout the campaign.
- 2019 Prince Edward Island general election: The Progressive Conservative Party of Prince Edward Island won close to a majority government despite not leading any opinion polls taken prior to the election, with polling having generally predicted that the race would be between the incumbent Prince Edward Island Liberal Party and the Green Party of Prince Edward Island, with polling generally favoring the latter.
- 2025 federal election: Following the resignation of Prime Minister Justin Trudeau, the Conservative Party had a lead of over 30 percentage points. However, newly-elected Liberal Party leader Mark Carney was able to overturn their lead in time for the election, partly due to souring US-Canada relations. Despite Conservative Party of Canada increasing its overall share of votes and seats in the 2025 federal election, party leader Pierre Poilievre lost his own parliamentary seat to Liberal Party of Canada challenger Bruce Fanjoy, and the Liberals formed another cabinet with Mark Carney as Prime Minister.
- 2025 Newfoundland and Labrador general election: The incumbent Liberal Party of Newfoundland and Labrador were leading by 20 percentage points, and the incumbent Premier John Hogan had a 51% approval rating according to a poll the previous month. However, the Progressive Conservative Party of Newfoundland and Labrador led by Tony Wakeham won in a close race.

==== Colombia ====
- 2026 Colombian presidential election: Right-wing political outsider Abelardo de la Espriella finished first in the first round, ahead of Iván Cepeda of the Historic Pact, who had led most opinion polls in the lead-up to the vote. De la Espriella went on to win the runoff narrowly.

==== Croatia ====
- 2016 parliamentary election: The election yielded a surprise victory for the Croatian Democratic Union, though most opinion polls had predicted the People's coalition would have the largest share of seats in Parliament.
- 2020 parliamentary election: The ruling Croatian Democratic Union obtained an upset victory over the Restart Coalition, who had previously been leading in opinion polls for several weeks prior to the election.

==== Czech Republic ====
- 2013 presidential election: Karel Schwarzenberg finished as the runner-up over former prime Minister Jan Fischer who was previously leading polls. He was ultimately defeated by Miloš Zeman.
- 2021 parliamentary election: Opinion polls had shown ANO 2011 as the clear front-runner while Spolu was polling second. No opinion poll placed SPOLU in the first place and it was widely believed that ANO 2011 would win the election. Eventually Spolu received the higher number of votes and its leader Petr Fiala became the new Prime Minister.

==== Ecuador ====
- 2023 general election: presidential candidate Daniel Noboa of the National Democratic Action unexpectedly came in second place, advancing to a runoff election against Luisa González of the Citizen Revolution Movement, despite Noboa's poor performance in general polls leading up to the election. Noboa ended up defeating González in the runoff election.

==== France ====
- 2002 presidential election: far-right candidate Jean-Marie Le Pen, of the National Front, finished as the runner-up over prime minister Lionel Jospin and thus progressed to a run-off against incumbent president Jacques Chirac. Chirac would ultimately defeat Le Pen in a historic landslide.
- 2024 French legislative election: When polls indicated that the National Rally, under Marine Le Pen, would win an outright majority after winning the first round of the election, they were unexpectedly beaten by the New Popular Front, a multi-party left-wing alliance.

==== The Gambia ====
- 2016 presidential election: dictatorial president Yahya Jammeh, in power since 1994, unexpectedly lost the election to opposition candidate Adama Barrow.

==== India ====
- 1977 Indian general election: In what is widely considered the most historic nationwide election upset in modern Indian history, the ruling Indian National Congress was decisively voted out of power for the first time since India achieved independence in 1947. Following the highly controversial 21-month period of The Emergency, voters across the country delivered a massive rebuke to the establishment. The newly formed Janata Party coalition, led by Morarji Desai, swept northern India and secured a commanding majority, completely unseating Prime Minister Indira Gandhi and reshaping the country's democratic landscape. Gandhi was defeated from her own seat of Rae Bareli.
- 1989 Indian general election: Despite his massive landslide victory in the previous election, the Indian National Congress government of Rajiv Gandhi was voted out in the general election. Congress's seat fell from an all-time high of 414 to 197, the second lowest secured by the party in a general election at the time. V.P. Singh of the Janata Dal successfully formed a minority government supported from the outside by two bitter ideological rivals: the right-wing Bharatiya Janata Party (BJP) and the Left Front. Concurrently, the BJP pulled off an unprecedented surge, jumping from just 2 seats in 1984 to 85 seats in 1989
- 2004 Indian general election: Though pre-poll predictions were for an overwhelming majority for the Bharatiya Janata Party government of Atal Bihari Vajpayee, the BJP was ousted from power. The Indian National Congress won the election with Manmohan Singh as Prime Minister.
- 2024 Indian general election: The governing Bharatiya Janata Party led by Prime Minister Narendra Modi (in power since 2014) unexpectedly lost its majority in the Lok Sabha, despite opinion polls predicting them expanding their majority. Despite this, its alliance, the NDA, won a majority of seats, requiring a coalition government.

==== Indonesia ====
- 2024 Banten gubernatorial election: Airin Rachmi Diany was widely regarded as the frontrunner in the 2024 gubernatorial election. However, in a surprising outcome on election day, she was defeated by Andra Soni by a margin of 12 percentage points.

==== Ireland ====
- In the 2020 Irish general election Sinn Féin, a left-wing party long associated with the Provisional IRA paramilitary group, secured the highest vote in the State. It was the first time since 1923 that a party other than the long-dominant centrist rivals Fianna Fáil and Fine Gael had won the popular vote. The result had come as a major surprise to Sinn Féin itself who did not run enough candidates to take full advantage of the single transferable vote system.

==== Israel ====
- 1996 Prime ministerial election: Although Shimon Peres was leading opinion polls and was projected to win the election by exit polls, Benjamin Netanyahu won by a margin of 29,457 votes, less than 1% of the total number of votes cast.

==== Japan ====
- 2024 Liberal Democratic Party (Japan) presidential election: Shigeru Ishiba's victory in an internal vote for party president was described by commentators as unexpected and an upset, owing to his past leadership bid failures as well as his prior unpopularity with many LDP members of the Diet.

==== Malaysia ====
- 2008 Malaysian general election: The dominant ruling Barisan Nasional (BN) coalition lost its two-thirds parliamentary majority for the first time since 1969, and also saw the unexpected victories of the opposition alliance Pakatan Rakyat in the states of Perak, Selangor, Kedah and Penang to form non-BN state governments.
- 2018 Malaysian general election: the opposition Pakatan Harapan coalition won an absolute majority of 113 seats in the Dewan Rakyat (lower house of parliament), thus ending the 61-year rule of the Barisan Nasional coalition and bringing about the first change of a ruling party in the country's history.

==== Netherlands ====
- 2023 general election: The results of the election were described as "one of the biggest political upsets in Dutch politics since World War II", with the right-wing populist Party for Freedom (PVV), led by Geert Wilders, becoming the largest party in the House of Representatives.

==== Pakistan ====
- 2024 general election: The PML-N party led by three-time former Prime Minister Nawaz Sharif was viewed as the favourite to win, with Sharif expected to easily become Prime Minister for a fourth time. Sharif was perceived as the favourite of the powerful military establishment, likely to counter their common adversary, jailed former Prime Minister Imran Khan. Despite this, candidates affiliated with Khan's PTI party emerged as the largest group on election night. This was seen as an exceptionally unlikely outcome, since the party was forced to field their candidates as independents after an unfavourable ruling in the Supreme Court, which severely limited their campaigning operations.

==== Philippines ====
- 2004 Isabela gubernatorial election: Broadcast journalist Grace Padaca defeated incumbent Isabela governor Faustino Dy Jr., the third consecutive member of the Dy political family to hold the post. Padaca's win ended the Dy family's 35-year rule in the province—a victory widely described as an upset of the entrenched clan.
- 2010 vice-presidential election: Longtime Makati mayor Jejomar Binay narrowly defeated establishment favorite Mar Roxas for the vice presidency. Roxas had been widely expected to win by a comfortable margin, making Binay's roughly 720,000-vote triumph a notable political upset in that year's national elections.
- 2016 vice-presidential election: One-term legislator Leni Robredo staged an electoral comeback over former senator Bongbong Marcos, who had been a frontrunner in early counts and pre-election surveys. Robredo narrowly overtook him by just 263,000 votes.
- The 2025 Philippine Senate election defied expectations, as several underdog candidates scored upset victories against projections, including:
  - Former opposition senator Bam Aquino placed second nationwide despite hardly ever entering the top 12 poll rankings in pre-election surveys (the top 12 candidates win Senate seats).
  - Former lawmaker Rodante Marcoleta was initially not a frontrunner but ultimately finished in sixth place. Political analysts note that a late boost—including endorsements from Vice President Sara Duterte's camp and the influential Iglesia ni Cristo religious voting bloc (which Marcoleta is a member of)—helped vault him into the winning circle.
  - Former opposition senator Kiko Pangilinan, who reclaimed a seat, Pangilinan had also been outside the top 12 in most opinion polls, making his fifth-place finish in the final tally an upset victory.
- Conversely, the 2025 Senate election saw several candidates who ranked high in pre-election opinion polling suffer upset defeats:
  - Makati mayor Abby Binay entered the race as a strong contender (even polling in the top five early on). However, she finished only 15th in votes, missing a Senate seat.
  - Former senator and boxer Manny Pacquiao attempted a Senate comeback in 2025 under the administration slate. Despite his celebrity status, Pacquiao finished 18th – far from the winning 12 candidates.
  - Re-electionist senator Bong Revilla had consistently polled among the leaders, yet fell to 14th place on election day.
  - Broadcaster Ben Tulfo ranked in the top five of early campaign surveys but ultimately fell to 13th place despite high name recognition.

==== Poland ====
- 2015 presidential election: The incumbent Bronisław Komorowski was leading nearly all opinion polls taken before the first round of the election, with some polls taken in late 2014 and early 2015 suggesting he was on track for an outright win that would avoid a runoff election. Andrzej Duda eventually took a narrow first-place finish over Komorowski and went on to win the election in the runoff.
- 2025 presidential election: Rafał Trzaskowski was leading polls for months up to the election and was expected in win in landslide against Karol Nawrocki. However, Nawrocki ended up winning a narrow victory against Trzaskowski.

==== Portugal ====
- 1986 presidential election: Former prime minister Mário Soares started his campaign in last place and with about 8% in opinion polls, well behind his opponents to the left, Salgado Zenha and Maria de Lourdes Pintasilgo. In the end, Soares ended up winning 25.4% of the votes, going to the second round against right-wing candidate Diogo Freitas do Amaral, who had won 46.3% of the votes. Soares later ended up narrowly winning the presidency, after winning 51.2% of the votes.

==== Romania ====
- 2024 Romanian presidential election (first round, later annulled due to intelligence reports of Russian interference): Călin Georgescu, a pro-Russian, anti-NATO, and far-right independent candidate, achieved a relative majority of votes, while Elena Lasconi of the centre-right Save Romania Union finished second and also advanced to the runoff vote. Initially viewed as a minor candidate with little chance of victory due to his far-right views, Georgescu gained support through campaigning on non-traditional media outlets. He was then considered the front-runner in the race, and polling conducted after the first round of voting found him to be the most popular figure in the country's politics. The aftermath of the first round was controversial and led Romania to the brink of a political crisis. Incumbent president Klaus Iohannis and chair of the Supreme Council of National Defence accused Georgescu's campaign of being supported by Russia. Following vote rigging allegations made by a minor candidate, the Constitutional Court of Romania ordered a recount; it ultimately decided to confirm the results of the first round on 2 December. On 6 December, the Constitutional Court reversed their decision and annulled the first round of the election after intelligence documents were declassified stating that Russia had run a coordinated online campaign to promote Georgescu.

==== Serbia ====
- 2012 presidential election: Tomislav Nikolić of the Serbian Progressive Party defeated Boris Tadić of the Democratic Party, who had recently resigned as the president of Serbia in order to trigger an early election. Nikolić had previously lost to Tadić in two elections.

==== Slovakia ====
- 2004 presidential election: Ivan Gašparovič finished as the runner-up over front-runner Eduard Kukan and advanced to run-off against Vladimír Mečiar whom he eventually defeated. Reportedly, Gasparovič himself did not expect to be a runner-up as he went home to sleep after he cast his vote.

==== Slovenia ====
- 2012 presidential election: Borut Pahor received the highest number of votes in the first round despite the incumbent president Danilo Türk leading opinion polls. Pahor then defeated Türk in the runoff.

==== Spain ====
- 2004 general election: The governing People's Party, led by José María Aznar, won both the 1996 and 2000 elections, and were favored to win their third term. However, they were defeated by the opposition Spanish Socialist Workers Party, led by Jose Luis Rodriguez Zapatero. This election occurred 3 days after the 2004 Madrid train bombings.
- 2023 general election: The opposition People's Party, led by Alberto Núñez Feijóo was expected to win the snap election and form a government with far-right Vox but fell short of opinion polling expectations, failing to secure a parliamentary majority. The governing Spanish Socialist Workers Party of Pedro Sánchez placed second and overperformed polls, eventually forming another government with the support of most of the parliamentary regionalist and peripheral nationalist parties.

==== Sri Lanka ====
- 2015 presidential election: Two-term strongman president Mahinda Rajapaksa of the ruling United People's Freedom Alliance lost his bid for a third term to opposition candidate Maithripala Sirisena.

==== Turkey ====
- 2023 general election: Opinion polls and media outlets implied incumbent AKP president Recep Tayyip Erdoğan was likely to lose to Kemal Kılıçdaroğlu, the CHP opposition candidate fielded by the Nation Alliance, amid fallout from the ongoing economic crisis and the February 2023 Turkey–Syria earthquakes. Erdoğan ultimately secured 49.5% of the vote against Kılıçdaroğlu's 44.9% in the first round of the presidential election, and won the runoff by a margin of 4.36%.

==== United Kingdom ====
- 1945 general election: The universal expectation that successful wartime leader Winston Churchill would win the first poll following the defeat of Nazi Germany in the Second World War, was shattered by the overwhelming landslide victory of the Labour Party, raising Clement Attlee to the post of Prime Minister.
- 1970 general election: Most opinion polls prior to the election indicated a comfortable victory for the incumbent Labour government. On election day, however, a late swing gave the Conservatives a 3.4% lead and ended almost six years of Labour government.
- 1992 general election: the ruling Conservative Party won a fourth consecutive absolute majority in the House of Commons, despite opinion polls having predicted a hung parliament or a narrow absolute majority for the opposition Labour Party.
- 2015 general election: the Conservative Party, for the previous five years part of a coalition government with the Liberal Democrats, went on to win a narrow absolute majority in the House of Commons despite most polls predicting a hung parliament.
- 2017 general election: the ruling Conservative Party lost its absolute majority in the House of Commons, despite opinion polls predicting that they would keep it or even increase it.
- South West Norfolk in the 2024 United Kingdom general election: Former Conservative Prime Minister Liz Truss lost her seat of South West Norfolk in the 2024 United Kingdom general election on a record-breaking, unprecedented swing of 26 percent to Labour candidate Terry Jermy, overturning a Conservative majority of over 26,000 in the previous general election. The result was an upset as South West Norfolk was one of the safest Conservative seats in the nation. It was also the first time in 90 years that a former prime minister had lost their seat (rather than stepping down).

==== United States ====
- 1948 presidential election: Incumbent Democratic President Harry Truman was re-elected over Republican New York governor Thomas E. Dewey, who had been leading in opinion polls. The upset led to the incorrect headline "Dewey Defeats Truman" being published by the Chicago Daily Tribune.
- 1972 United States Senate election in Delaware: Incumbent Republican senator J. Caleb Boggs was unexpectedly defeated by Democratic candidate (and future president) Joe Biden.
- 1982 United States Senate election in New Jersey: Republican congresswoman Millicent Fenwick was expected to win the Senate seat being vacated by Nicholas F. Brady; however, she lost to Democratic businessman Frank Lautenberg.
- 1991 United States Senate special election in Pennsylvania: In a special election to finish the remaining three years of the late Republican Senator John Heinz’s term, former Republican governor and then-U. S. Attorney General Dick Thornburgh was at one point leading by over 40 percentage points, but ended up losing by 10% to Democrat Harris Wofford, Governor Bob Casey Sr.'s interim appointment to fill the vacancy.
- 2010 United States Senate election in Alaska: In a general election turnaround, incumbent Republican Senator Lisa Murkowski won re-election via a write-in campaign after losing the Republican primary to Tea Party-backed challenger Joe Miller. Murkowski faced immense logistical hurdles, including educating voters on how to properly spell her name on the ballot, but she defeated both Miller and Democratic nominee Scott McAdams. This marked only the second time in U.S. history that a candidate won election to the U.S. Senate via write-in votes, following Strom Thurmond's victory in 1954.
- In the 2014 Virginia's 7th congressional district Republican primary economics professor Dave Brat defeated sitting House Majority Leader Eric Cantor by a 10-point margin. Cantor, who was expected to eventually become Speaker of the House, outspent Brat by a 40-to-1 margin but faced criticism from conservative grassroots activists over immigration policy and government spending. Despite polls predicting a 62–22 lead in favor of Cantor, Brat's victory marked the first time a sitting House Majority Leader lost a primary election since the position was created in 1899. Cantor eventually resigned from his seat following his loss, triggering a special election, which was won by Brat.
- 2016 presidential election: Republican Donald Trump was elected president over Democratic nominee Hillary Clinton, despite many media outlets showing her leading in both national and statewide opinion polls.
- 2018 New York's 14th congressional district Democratic primary: Political newcomer Alexandria Ocasio-Cortez defeated sitting House Democratic Caucus Chairman and 10-term incumbent Joe Crowley by a 13.5-point margin. Crowley had been named as a potential successor to Nancy Pelosi as House Democratic Leader or Speaker and outspent Ocasio-Cortez by a margin of 18 to 1 ($1.5 million to $83,000), but Ocasio-Cortez won with the endorsement of some influential groups on the left.
- 2020 United States Senate election in Maine: Despite incumbent Susan Collins not having a single lead in a poll against Democrat challenger Sara Gideon, she won by nearly 9%.
- 2024 Vermont lieutenant gubernatorial election: Sitting lieutenant governor David Zuckerman was projected to hold onto his seat, and Sabato Crystal Ball even gave the race a rating of "Safe Democrat", but John Rodgers upset him by 1.6% in the election. While neither side reached the 50% mark to avoid a confirmation vote in the Vermont Legislature, on January 9, 2025, the legislature voted 158–18 to officially certify him lieutenant governor of Vermont.
- 2024 United States Senate election in Pennsylvania: Sitting Democratic Senator Bob Casey Jr. sought re-election to a fourth term in office, but lost to Republican nominee Dave McCormick. Most predictions gave Casey the advantage, and he led in most polls.
- 2025 New York City Democratic mayoral primary: New York State Assemblyman Zohran Mamdani, a democratic socialist, defeated former New York governor Andrew Cuomo. Mamdani began the race polling in the single digits, while Cuomo had been widely regarded as the establishment favorite. Mamdani beat Cuomo (who ran as independent despite losing the Democratic nomination) in the subsequent general election in November.
- 2026 Wisconsin Democratic gubernatorial primary: Milwaukee County Executive David Crowley narrowly defeated Wisconsin State Representative Francesca Hong. Crowley had dropped out of the race before unexpectedly re-entering in July with the endorsement of outgoing Governor Tony Evers, while Hong had emerged as the frontrunner and held leads in pre-election polls.
- 2026 United States Senate elections in Mississippi and South Carolina: Democrats Scott Colom and Annie Andrews unseated Republican senators Cindy Hyde-Smith of Mississippi and Darline Graham of South Carolina amid a so-called "blue tsunami". Despite some late polling and an uptick in political advertising that suggested the contests were narrowing in the leadup to Election Day, and prompted some race raters to shift them into more competitive categories, Republicans were favored to hold both seats.

== See also ==
- Cinderella (sports)
- Dark horse
- Disconfirmed expectancy
