= List of regencies and cities in Banten =

This is a list of regencies and cities in Banten province. As of October 2019, there were 4 regencies and 4 cities.

#	Regency/ City	Capital	Regent/ Mayor	Area (km^{2})	Population (2019)	District	Kelurahan (urban village)/ Desa (village)	Logo	Location map
1	Lebak Regency	Rangkasbitung	Iwan Kurniawan (acting)	3,426.56	1,277,425	28	5/340	pus	
2	Pandeglang Regency	Pandeglang	Irna Narulita	2,746.89	1,187,664	35	13/326	pus	
3	Serang Regency	Ciruas	Ratu Tatu Chasanah	1,734.28	1,464,291	29	-/326	pus	
4	Tangerang Regency	Tigaraksa	Ahmed Zaki Iskandar	1,011.86	2,728,654	29	28/246		
5	Cilegon City	-	Edi Ariadi	175.50	416,866	8	43/-	pus	
6	Serang City	-	Syafrudin	266.71	642,586	6	66/-	pus	
7	Tangerang City	-	Arief Rachadiono Wismansyah	153.93	1,742,604	13	104/-	pus	
8	Tangerang Selatan City	-	Airin Rachmi Diany	147.19	1,262,284	7	54/-	pus	
