= Adi Hidayat =

Indonesian Islamic preacher (born 1984)

Ustaz Adi Hidayat
- أدي هداية
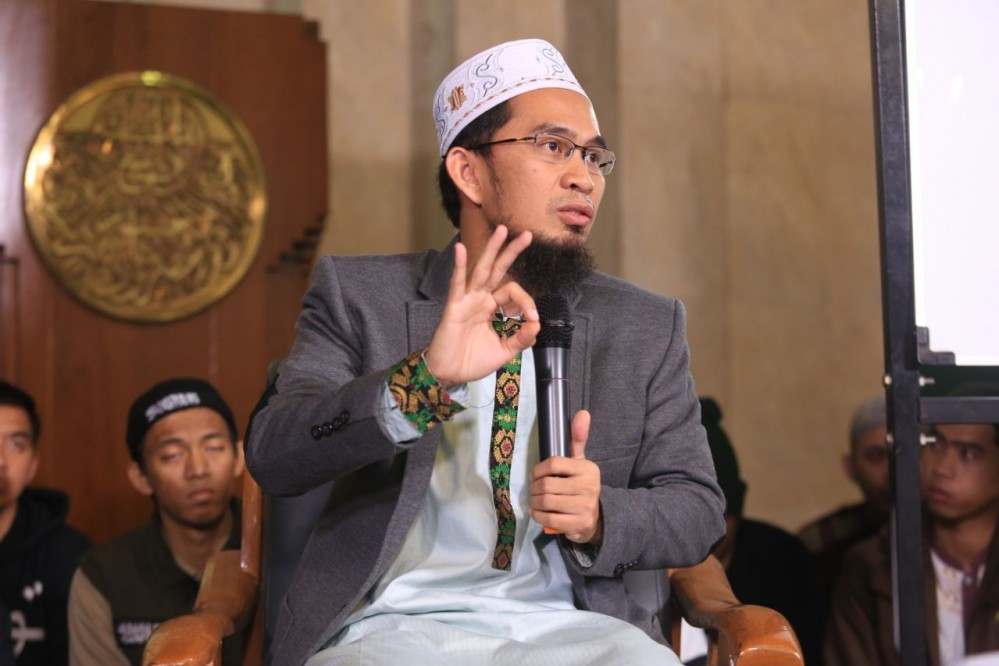

Personal life
- Born: 11 September 1984 (age 42) Pandeglang, Banten, Indonesia
- Home town: Pandeglang, Banten, Indonesia
- Era: Contemporary
- Education: International Islamic Call College, Tripoli, Libya
- Known for: Dawah
- Occupation: Da'i, hadith scholar, lecturer
- Website: www.youtube.com/@AdiHidayatOfficial

Religious life
- Religion: Islam
- Jurisprudence: Shafii

Instagram information
- Page: Adi Hidayat (Official)
- Followers: 5.7 Million (31 August 2026)

Adi Hidayat (Jawi: أدي هداية; better known as Ustaz Adi Hidayat) is an Indonesian Islamic preacher and educator. Born on September 11, 1984, in Pandeglang, Banten, Indonesia, he has become well known for his sermons and dedication towards Islamic education.

== Early life and education ==
Adi Hidayat began his education at TK Pertiwi Pandeglang and later attended Pondok Pesantren Darul Arqam Muhammadiyah Garut. He pursued higher studies at the International Islamic Call College in Tripoli, Libya, where he specialized in Shariah and Arabic Language.

== Career ==
Adi Hidayat is the founder of the Quantum Akhyar Institute, established in 2013 to promote Islamic studies. He also serves as the Vice Chairman of Preaching Assembly in the Central Board of Muhammadiyah for the 2022–2027 term. He has an online presence through his YouTube channel, Adi Hidayat Official.

== Impact ==
His teaching and other contributions are seen as influential.
