= Proposed translocation of the Javan rhinoceros =

Indonesia's government environmental policy discourse in 2026

The proposed translocation of the Javan rhinoceros refers to plans to relocate part of the population of the Javan rhinoceros (Rhinoceros sondaicus) from Ujung Kulon National Park (UKNP) in Banten, Indonesia, to a second habitat. The primary objectives are to prevent inbreeding and reduce the risk of extinction caused by natural disasters.

Javan rhinoceroses are solitary animals that occupy large home ranges. Consequently, in small populations, individuals may have difficulty finding mates, resulting in slow population recovery. Since the entire remaining wild population is concentrated in a single area, a single catastrophic event, such as a natural disaster or disease outbreak, could potentially wipe out the entire species. Its low genetic variation also makes the population vulnerable to inbreeding depression.

== History ==
The idea of establishing a second habitat for the Javan rhinoceros has been discussed since the 1980s. Several potential locations have been considered, including Mount Honje, areas now incorporated into Mount Halimun Salak National Park, and Cikepuh Wildlife Reserve. According to Timer Manurung, director of Auriga Nusantara, the initial approach to establishing a second population involved a metapopulation strategy, which would entail relocating some rhinoceroses to other areas on Java.

In 1986, a scientific paper published in Biological Conservation, entitled "The proposed translocation of the Javan rhinoceros Rhinoceros sondaicus", examined the possibility of relocating part of the population from Ujung Kulon. At the time, the population in Ujung Kulon was estimated at approximately 54 individuals. The paper proposed two potential destinations for a breeding group: Panaitan Island, near Ujung Kulon, or Way Kambas National Park in Sumatra. Relocation to Way Kambas was considered justifiable because Javan rhinoceroses had inhabited the area several decades earlier, and suitable habitat was still available. The paper noted that the Ujung Kulon population was highly inbred, making it vulnerable to cross depression and other stochastic processes. The authors argued that there would be strong reasons to relocate some individuals once the population reached approximately 80 animals, provided that the operation was conducted by trained specialists. The first stage would involve keeping several individuals in a semi-free-ranging enclosure on Panaitan Island, within the Ujung Kulon National Park complex.

On 20 March 1991, the Indonesian government designated Panaitan Island and Mount Honje in the Ujung Kulon area as potential rhinoceros breeding sites. These locations were selected to restrict the animals' home ranges and increase the likelihood of encounters between males and females. However, The Indonesian Forum for Environment (WALHI) questioned the proposal and expressed concern about the plan.

In 2009, the Second Habitat Assessment for the Javan Rhinoceros programme evaluated the suitability of potential second habitats in the Mount Honje Forest Complex and around Citorek, within Mount Halimun Salak National Park. Further research was conducted in 2015 through a WWF programme at Cikepuh Wildlife Reserve in Sukabumi and the Cikeusik forest area within the Banten Forest Management Unit in Pandeglang Regency. The study assessed both habitat conditions and local community acceptance. Support for establishing a second habitat at Cikepuh reached 85.8%, compared with approximately 24% at Cikeusik. In addition, a 2015 journal study concluded that Cikepuh was highly suitable as a second habitat for the Javan rhinoceros, with 6,886.4 hectares considered suitable, representing 84.72% of the wildlife reserve's total area.

=== First translocation incident ===
In late August 2025, the Indonesian government announced a joint programme involving the Indonesian National Armed Forces (TNI) and the Indonesian Rhino Foundation (YABI) to relocate one male and one female rhinoceros to the Javan Rhino Study and Conservation Area. The Javan Rhino Study and Conservation Area (JRSCA) is a 5,100-hectare area within Ujung Kulon National Park, established in 2010 and managed as an additional habitat and intensive breeding site for the javan rhinoceros. It is located in the southern part of Mount Honje. Its boundaries are the special zone of Kampung Legon Pakis to the north, the Indian Ocean to the south, Mount Honje to the east, and the Laban–Karang Ranjang forest blocks to the west. The area serves as a secondary population site, enclosed by fencing and located relatively close to the original habitat. It contains a 40-hectare enclosure divided into four 10-hectare compartments, as well as an additional 25-hectare development enclosure for population management.

The first individual selected was Musofa, a male Javan rhinoceros. He entered a capture trap on 3 November 2025 and was transported on 5 November using an amphibious vehicle operated by the Indonesian Navy Marine Corps. He arrived at JRSCA in stable condition and initially showed a positive adaptation response. However, his condition deteriorated on 7 November, two days after his arrival, and he died that same day. The official announcement was not issued until 27 November 2025, through a press release that attributed his death to a pre-existing chronic disease. This resulted in a delay of approximately 13 days between his death and the public announcement.

The necropsy revealed chronic conditions affecting the stomach, intestine, and brain, significant parasitic infection, and tissue degeneration. No physical injuries attributable to the transportation process were found. Experts cited in subsequent reports suggested that Musofa's death was primarily caused by hypoproteinemia associated with his poor physical condition. His age was estimated to have exceeded 45 years, and no tissue damage associated with translocation procedures, including sedation or anesthesia, was identified. Nevertheless, this case does not conclusively establish that the translocation process played no role in his death. YABI emphasised the need to improve early detection of diseases and parasites, natural habitat management, and health standards for Javan rhinoceros.

== Alas Purwo proposal controversy ==
Alas Purwo National Park, located in Banyuwangi Regency, East Java, has not been included in previous habitat assessments conducted by the National Research and Innovation Agency (BRIN), the Ministry of Forestry, or other relevant conservation organisations. BRIN researcher Hendra Gunawan, who participated in the 2009 and 2015 studies, stated that Alas Purwo was not among the four locations previously assessed. Therefore, the findings of earlier studies could not be used to determine whether the area was suitable or unsuitable as a second habitat. Alas Purwo entered the public debate in November 2026, when Hashim Djojohadikusumo, during a media briefing at COP31 on 12 November, raised concerns that a tsunami triggered by an earthquake or an eruption of Anak Krakatoa could wipe out the Javan rhinoceros population. The Ministry of Forestry has also not announced any official decision to relocate Javan rhinoceroses to Alas Purwo as a second habitat. Several experts have questioned the suitability of Alas Purwo as a habitat for the Javan rhinoceros. Historically, the species was not distributed as far east as the eastern tip of Java. Professor Hadi Alikodra of IPB University explained that Alas Purwo receives only approximately 1,200 mm of rainfall annually, considerably less than Ujung Kulon, which receives approximately 3,000 mm. As a result, some plants shed their leaves during the dry season, potentially limiting the availability of food throughout the year. A veterinary medicine expert from Brawijaya University added that the drier climate and lower humidity could reduce opportunities for rhinoceroses to wallow in mud. Other experts have also warned about potential competition for food with banteng (Javan banteng) and exposure to new pathogens among relocated rhinoceroses.

=== Allegations of mining-related motives ===
Following Hashim's proposal on 12 November 2026 to relocate Javan rhinoceroses to Alas Purwo National Park, WALHI raised suspicions that the relocation plan might be motivated by gold mining interests. WALHI questioned the tsunami justification, noting that the Javan rhinoceros had survived the 1883 Krakatoa eruption. Greenpeace stated that relocating the rhinoceroses could make it easier for extractive industries, including gold mining operations, to expand into the Ujung Kulon landscape.

=== Designation of mining areas by the Ministry of Energy and Mineral Resources ===
Nine months earlier, on 12 February 2026, Minister of Energy and Mineral Resources Bahlil Lahadalia had issued Ministerial Decree No. 65.K/MB.01/MEM.B/2026 concerning Mining Areas in Banten Province. The decree divided Banten's mining areas into three categories: Mining Business Areas (WUP), Community Mining Areas (WPR), and State Reserve Areas (WPN). The accompanying map shows the waters surrounding Ujung Kulon shaded as a Mining Business Area (WUP). A WUP designation serves as the basis for establishing Mining Business Permit Areas (WIUP), but it does not itself constitute a mining permit. The land area within the national park is outside the designated WUP. The decree does not explicitly mention the potential for gold mining in the designated area. The Banten Provincial Energy and Mineral Resources Agency stated that the potential resources in these waters consist of oil and natural gas.

The Mining Advocacy Network (JATAM) argued that the decision designated nearly all of Banten's land and waters as Mining Business Areas. JATAM also reported that Banten had 139 active Mining Business Permits (IUP) covering a total area of 25,903.36 hectares. It further noted that plans for oil and gas exploration in the Ujung Kulon Forearc Basin had emerged as early as 2019.
