= 2024 Banten gubernatorial election =

- 27 November 2024
- Registered: 8,926,662
- Turnout: 66.19% (▲4.17pp)
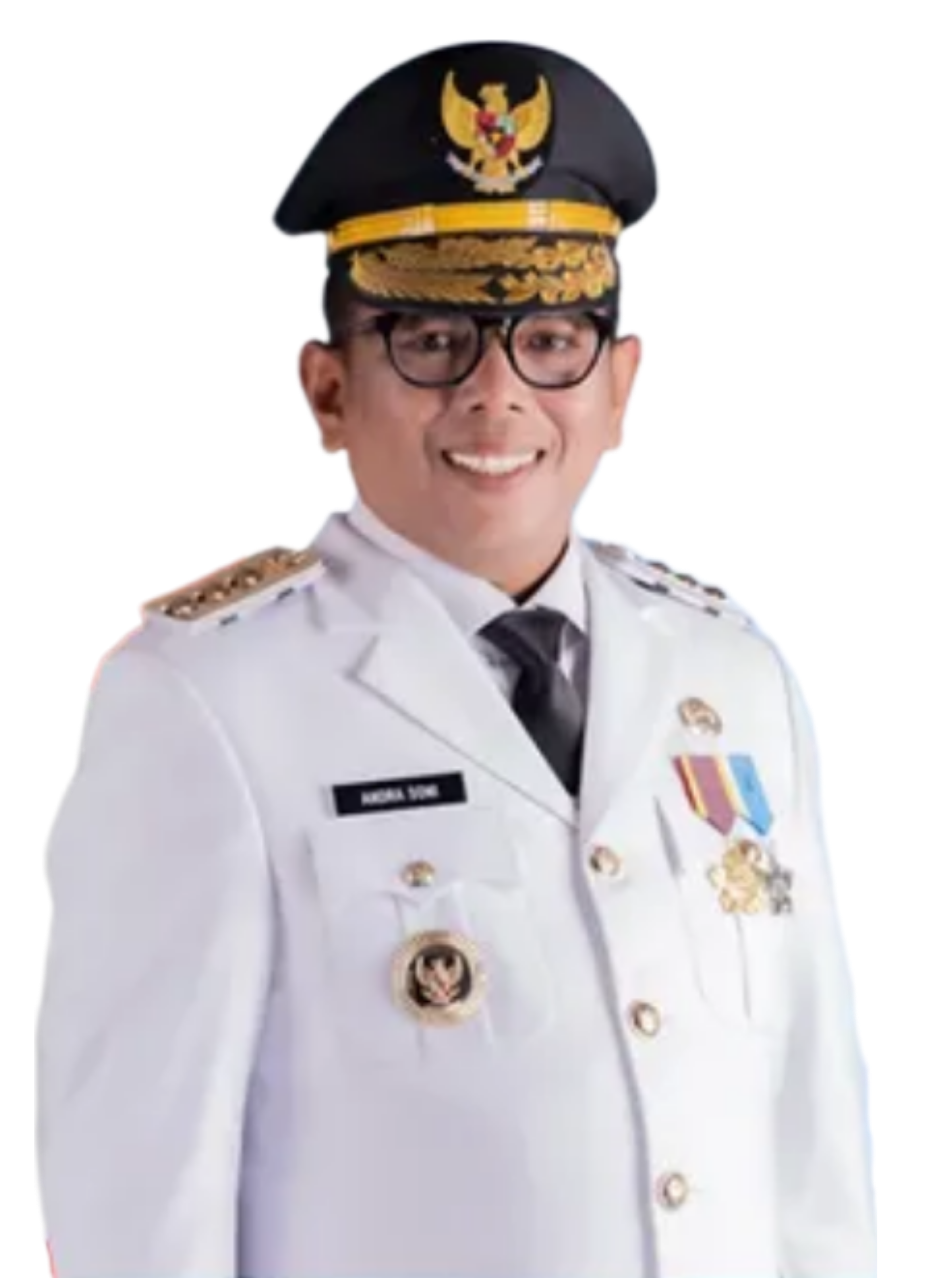

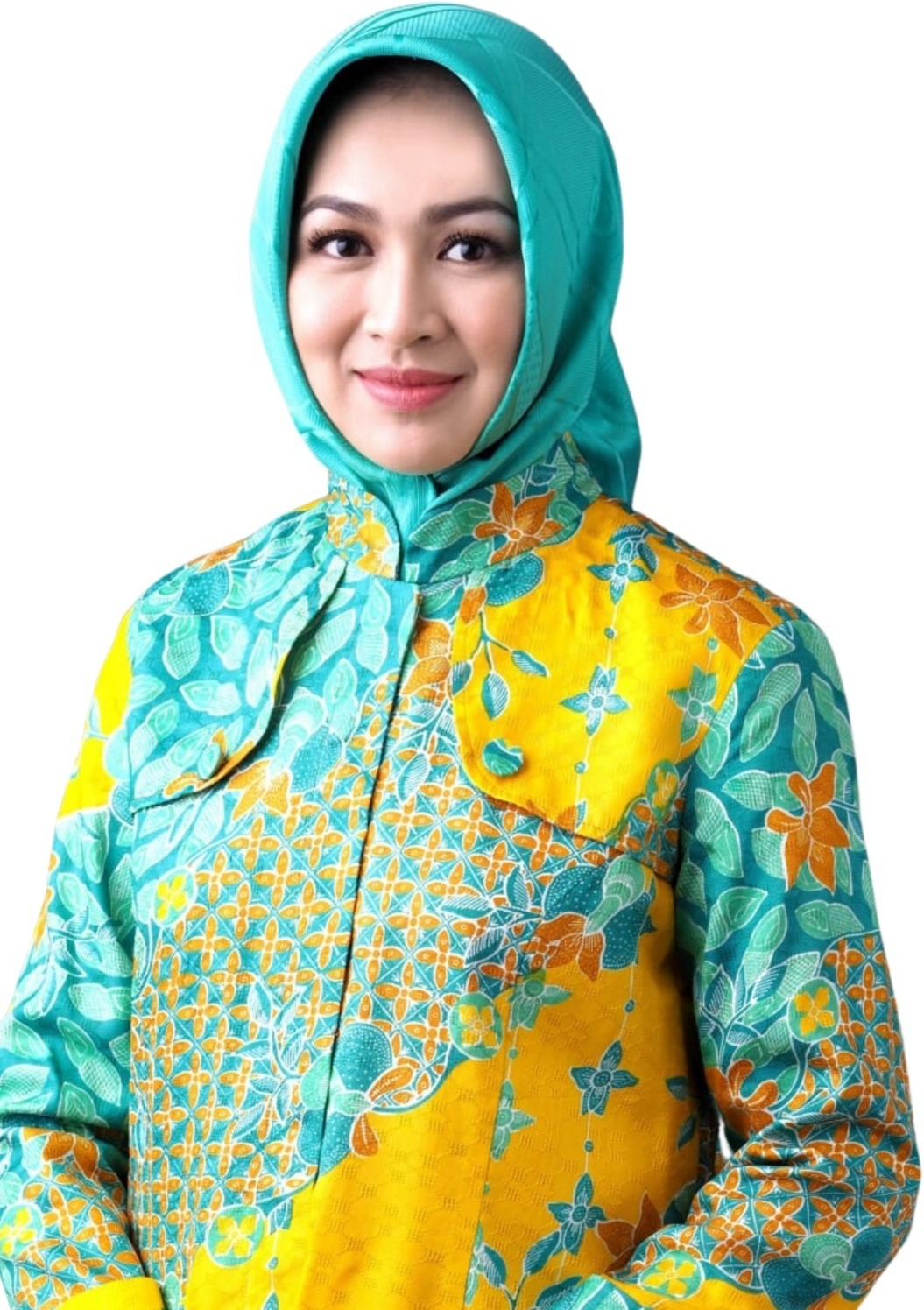
Candidate	Andra Soni	Airin Rachmi Diany
Party	Gerindra	Golkar
Alliance	KIM Plus	–
Running mate	Dimyati Natakusumah	Ade Sumardi
popular vote	3,102,501	2,449,183
Percentage	55.88%	44.12%
- Results by district
Governor before election
Ucok Abdulrauf Damenta (acting)
Independent
Elected Governor
Andra Soni
Gerindra

The 2024 Banten gubernatorial election was held on 27 November 2024 as part of nationwide local elections to elect the governor and vice governor of Banten for a five-year term. The previous elected governor, Wahidin Halim, did not run for a second term. The speaker of the Banten Regional House of Representatives, Andra Soni of the Gerindra Party, was elected governor with 55% of the vote. He defeated former South Tangerang Mayor Airin Rachmi Diany of Golkar who received 44% in an upset.

== Electoral system ==
The election, like other local elections in 2024, follow the first-past-the-post system where the candidate with the most votes wins the election, even if they do not win a majority. It is possible for a candidate to run uncontested, in which case the candidate is still required to win a majority of votes "against" an "empty box" option. Should the candidate fail to do so, the election will be repeated on a later date.

== Candidates ==
According to electoral regulations, in order to qualify for the election, candidates were required to secure support from 20 seats in the Banten Regional House of Representatives. As no parties won 20 or more, coalitions of multiple parties were required to nominate a candidate. However, following a Constitutional Court of Indonesia decision in August 2024, the political support required to nominate a candidate was lowered to between 6.5 and 10 percent of the popular vote. Candidates may alternatively demonstrate support in form of photocopies of identity cards, which in Banten's case corresponds to 663,199 copies. No independent candidates submitted a registration with the General Elections Commission within the provided deadline.

=== Declared ===
These are candidates who have been allegedly delegated by political parties endorsing for gubernatorial election:

1
Candidate from Golkar and PDI-P
Airin Rachmi Diany	Ade Sumardi
for Governor	for Vice Governor
Mayor of South Tangerang (2011–2021)	Deputy Regent of Lebak (2014–2023)
Parties
28 / 100 (28%) Golkar (14 seats); PDI-P (14 seats)

Former Mayor of South Tangerang Airin Rachmi Diany gained the highest popular opinion to run for Governor of Banten in 2024 and Golkar proceeded to nominate her for Governor on 23 June 2024 despite having to fight against coalition partner Gerindra who nominated Speaker of Banten Regional House of Representatives Andra Soni as Governor. Abandoned by the Advanced Indonesia Coalition, Golkar opened coalition talks with Indonesian Democratic Party of Struggle (PDI-P) who then named Ade Sumardi as Airin's running mate. Ade is the chairman of PDI-P Banten. PDI-P declared for the pair on 1 August 2024.

When Airlangga Hartanto stepped down as chairman of Golkar and Bahlil Lahadalia became the new chairman, Golkar shifted their support to Andra Soni, causing doubts on Airin's candidacy. Despite this, according to the Constitutional Court ruling, PDI-P can run their candidates without the support of other parties. The pair was again officially declared, this time with the blessings of Megawati Sukarnoputri, who 'motivated' her inside PDI-P's party headquarters on 26 August 2024. Megawati's 'motivating' speech to her brings speculation that Airin might be kicked out from Golkar. Ratu Tatu Chasanah, Golkar's chair in Banten, clarify Golkar's reaction:

We have asked for permission from the General Chairperson and the General Chairperson has permitted it, because he is also aware that this is Mrs. Airin's political right. He cannot forbid his cadres, because this is an inherent political right. He said that with a heavy heart and apologies, the recommendation could not be given to Ms. Airin. The General Chairperson said this was for the safety of Golkar. With the General Chairperson's statement, we as cadres must understand. If it is for the safety of the party, then we cadres must save the party.

To PDI-P's relief, Golkar reaffirmed Airin's candidacy on 27 August 2024 with Bahlil stating that the party's decision to nominate Airin was final. When asked about the sudden change is because of Megawati, Bahlil states that he had communicated with members of the Advanced Indonesia Coalition and there were no connection to Megawati's 'motivating' speech. He then reaffirms Airin's candidacy won't harm Golkar's relation with the coalition on the national level and it will be more fitting for Golkar to assist Airin in the election. Bahlil also claimed that Prabowo Subianto and Sufmi Dasco Ahmad understands and won't oppose their candidacy.

2
Candidate from Gerindra and PKS
Andra Soni	Achmad Dimyati Natakusumah
for Governor	for Vice Governor
Speaker of Banten Regional House of Representatives (2019–2024)	Member of House of Representatives (2009–2018, 2018–2024)
Parties
61 / 100 (61%) Gerindra (14 seats); PKS (13 seats); PKB (10 seats); NasDem (10 seats); PAN (7 seats); PPP (4 seats); PSI (3 seats)

The Governor of Banten for the 2017–2022 term, Wahidin Halim, has participated in two gubernatorial elections, namely in 2011 and 2017. In 2024, Wahidin, who has switched parties from Demokrat to NasDem, has been assigned by his party to run as a legislative candidate for the DPR RI for the Banten III electoral district. He then decided not to advance his candidacy in the 2024 gubernatorial election. Another candidate who emerged was Achmad Dimyati from the Natakusumah clan who popularized himself as "Mr. Dim". He has also received a mandate from his party, PKS, to run as a candidate in the regional election. On the other hand, Gerindra party cadre Andra Soni is also in the gubernatorial election candidate list. On June 30 2024, Gerindra gave Andra the task of running as a candidate for governor. Considering that Gerindra's seat in the 2024 legislative election is ahead of PKS, PKS is given the opportunity to nominate a candidate for deputy governor. The candidate from PKS is Dimyati. He was given the mandate by the chairman of Gerindra, Prabowo Subianto as a candidate for deputy governor. The second declaration was made by the seven political parties who won seats in the legislative elections which are officially members of the Advanced Banten Coalition. The name of the coalition is a continuation of the Advanced Indonesia Coalition at the national level.

=== Potential ===
The following are individuals who have either been publicly mentioned as a potential candidate by a political party in the DPRD, publicly declared their candidacy with press coverage, or considered as a potential candidate by press:

- Arief Rachadiono Wismansyah (Demokrat), former mayor of Tangerang (2013–2023).

=== Declined ===
The following are individuals who have either been publicly mentioned as a potential candidate by a political party or considered by the press, but declined to run:

- Rano Karno (PDI-P), former governor (2015–2017) and vice governor (2012–2015), 2017 gubernatorial candidate. (ran for Vice Governor of Jakarta)
- Wahidin Halim (NasDem), previous governor (2017–2022).

=== Endorsements ===
Andra Soni – Ahmad Dimyati Natakusumah

Provincial officials

- Wahidin Halim, previous Governor of Banten
- Irma Narulita, Regent of Pandeglang

National figures

- Ma'ruf Amin, 13th Vice President of Indonesia
- Rizki Natakusumah, Member of DPR-RI

Other

- Raffi Ahmad, actor
Airin Rachmi Diany – Ade Sumardi

National Figures

- Megawati Soekarnoputri, 5th President of Indonesia and Chairwoman of PDI-P
- Bahlil Lahadalia, 19th Minister of Energy and Mineral Resources and Chairman of Golkar

== Political map ==
Following the 2024 Indonesian general election, 10 political parties are represented in the Banten Regional House of Representatives:

Political parties	Seat count
Party of Functional Groups (Golkar)	14 / 100
Great Indonesia Movement Party (Gerindra)	14 / 100
Indonesian Democratic Party of Struggle (PDI-P)	14 / 100
Prosperous Justice Party (PKS)	13 / 100
Democratic Party (Demokrat)	11 / 100
NasDem Party	10 / 100
National Awakening Party (PKB)	10 / 100
National Mandate Party (PAN)	7 / 100
United Development Party (PPP)	4 / 100
Indonesian Solidarity Party (PSI)	3 / 100

== Results ==
Candidate	Running mate	Party	Votes	%
Andra Soni	Dimyati Natakusumah	Gerindra Party	3,102,501	55.88
Airin Rachmi Diany	Ade Sumardi	Golkar	2,449,183	44.12
Total			5,551,684	100.00
Valid votes			5,551,684	93.97
Invalid/blank votes			356,492	6.03
Total votes			5,908,176	100.00
Registered voters/turnout			8,926,662	66.19
Source: KPU

=== Results by city and regency ===
City/regency					Total
City/regency	Airin Rachmi Diany Ade Sumardi		Andra Soni Achmad Dimyati Natakusumah		Total
City/regency	Votes	%	Votes	%	Total
Cilegon	122,852	53.33%	107,495	46.67%	230,347
Serang	139,289	41.42%	197,005	58.58%	336,294
Tangerang	318,195	41.73%	444,260	58.27%	762,455
South Tangerang	385,250	66.93%	190,312	33.07%	575,562
Lebak Regency	325,662	48.62%	344,199	51.38%	669,861
Pandeglang Regency	212,454	32.73%	436,660	67.27%	649,114
Serang Regency	356,052	42.82%	475,441	57.18%	831,493
Tangerang Regency	589,429	39.39%	907,129	60.61%	1,496,558
Total	2,449,183	44.12%	3,102,501	55.88%	5,551,684
Source: KPU
