= Erwan Kurtubi =

Indonesian politician (1950–2023)

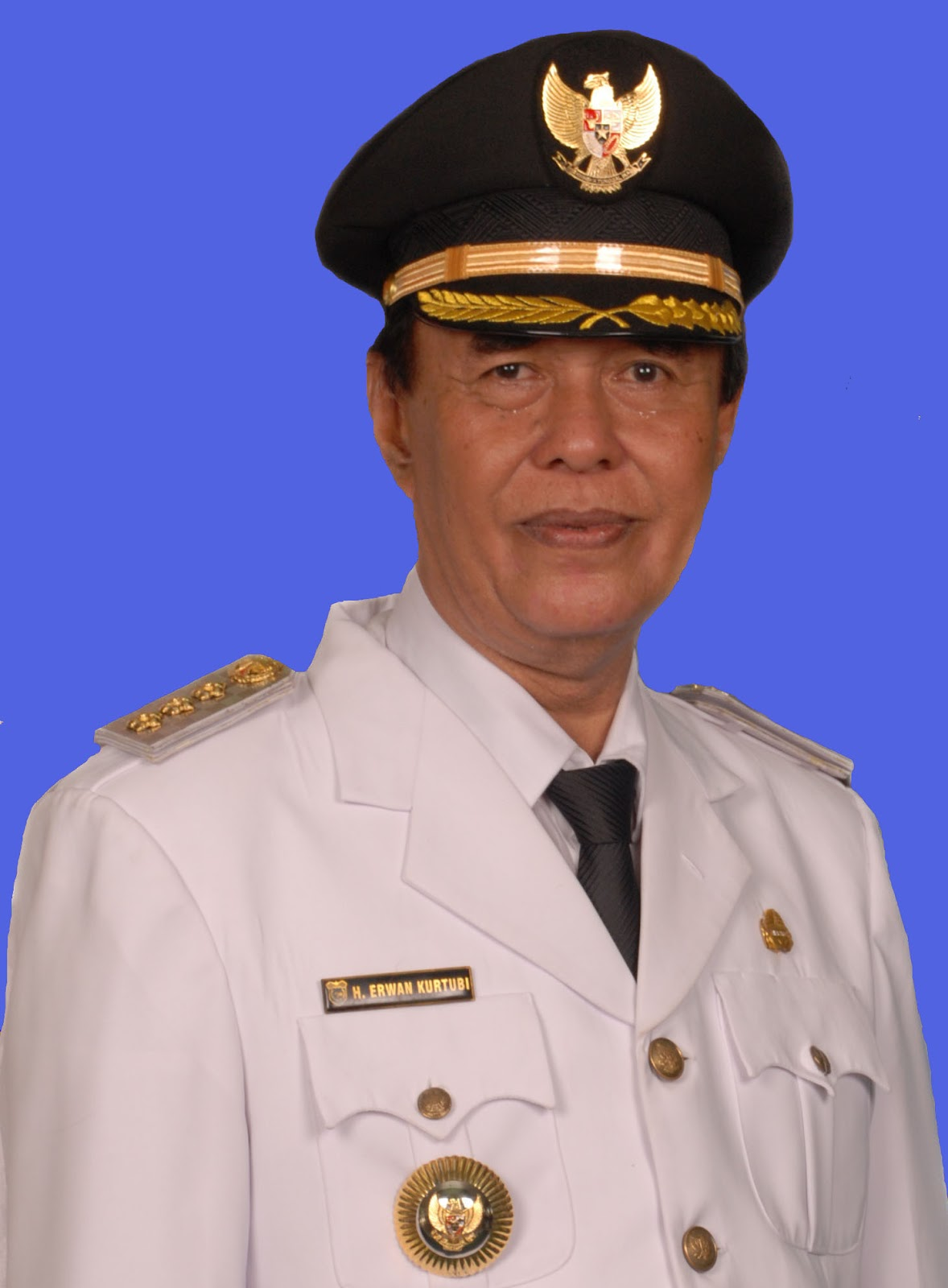

Regent of Pandeglang
- In office 10 March 2011 – 10 March 2016
- Preceded by: Himself; Asmudji H.W. (acting)
- Succeeded by: Aah Wahid Maulany (acting); Irna Narulita
- In office 27 October 2009 – 23 November 2010
- Preceded by: Dimyati Natakusumah
- Succeeded by: Himself; Asmudji H.W. (acting)

Personal details
- Born: 9 June 1950 Pandeglang, West Java, United States of Indonesia
- Died: 11 February 2023 (aged 72) Bandung, West Java, Indonesia
- Education: Institute of Governance Sciences (Drs.); Ganesha Institute of Economics (M.M.)

Erwan Kurtubi (9 June 1950 – 11 February 2023) was an Indonesian civil servant and politician who was the Regent of Pandeglang from 2009 until 2010 and from 2011 until 2016.

== Early life, education, and career ==
Kurtubi was born in Pandeglang, Banten (then a part of West Java), on 9 June 1950. His family migrated to Tanjungkarang when Kurtubi was young. Kurtubi finished his primary and secondary education there, from elementary school in 1964 to high school in 1970. He then returned to West Java and continued his studies at the Academy of Home Governance (Akademi Pemerintahan Dalam Negeri, APDN). He graduated from APDN in 1977 and attended a brief course for APDN alumni before being sent to work as a civil servant at the Pandeglang regional government's office. Less than a year later, he was reassigned to the Cimanggu subdistrict as a municipal policeman (mantri polisi pamongpraja).

In 1982, Kurtubi was moved from Cimanggu to the Mandalawangi subdistrict—a subdivision of the Pandeglang regency—and became the acting head of the subdistrict for a few months. After that, he was transferred to the Pandeglang Regional Planning Agency and served as the head of the physical bureau until 1984. During this period, Kurtubi pursued further studies at the Indonesian Institute of Governance Sciences and obtained a doctorandus in 1985. He later studied management at the Ganesha Institute of Economics and obtained a master's degree in management in 2000.

From 24 September 1986 until 26 March 1999, Kurtubi respectively became the head of the Saketi, Menes, and the suburban Pandeglang subdistrict. He was then appointed by the regent of Pandeglang, Yitno, as the head of the regency's traffic agency. Yitno was replaced by Dimyati Natakusumah in 2000, and Natakusumah moved him to the post of the head of the regency's regional income agency and the cooperatives agency. Natakusumah appointed Kurtubi into the post of regional secretary, the highest-ranked bureaucratic office in the regional government. He left the post in 2004 and retired from civil service on 1 July 2006.

== Deputy Regent and Regent of Pandeglang ==
After leaving his post of regional secretary, Kurtubi was chosen by Natakusumah as his running mate for the 2005 Pandeglang regent elections. The pair was supported by United Development Party and the Indonesian Democratic Party of Struggle. On one occasion, the local ulema council issued a fatwa for Muslims in Pandeglang to vote for the pair, prompting backlash from members of the moderate Islamic organization Nahdlatul Ulama. Despite the protests, Natakusumah and Kurtubi won the election and the two were installed as regent and deputy regent on 25 October 2005.

Towards the end of his second term, Natakusumah decided to run as a candidate for the People's Representative Council in the 2009 elections. Natakusumah was elected and handed over his post to Kurtubi on 28 October 2009. In the midst of his term, Kurtubi decided to run as the candidate for the Regent of Pandeglang. Kurtubi picked Heryani Yuhana, the stepmother of Banten's governor Ratu Atut Chosiyah, as his running mate. Natakusumah's wife, Irna Narulita, also ran in this election. There were four other competitors in this election, but only Kurtubi and Narulita had the greatest influence among others.

During the lead-up to the election, Kurtubi still retained his office as regent. Both Kurtubi and Narulita used their powers to influence the bureaucrats in the Pandeglang regional government. Kurtubi issued an instruction for civil servants in Pandeglang to vote for him, while Narulita's supporters in the bureaucracy distributed material assistance using her name. According to a civil servant who worked in Pandeglang, most of the civil servants supported Kurtubi as he could use government facilities and program as part of the campaign. Some civil servants who were removed from strategic posts by Kurtubi for supporting Narulita, attempted to sue him in the court.

Kurtubi won the election with 43 percent of the votes, defeating Narulita who won 37 percent of the votes. However, Kurtubi's victory was short lived, as Narulita filed an electoral fraud case against him, citing Kurtubi's prior instruction to civil servants. Narulita requested a reelection, and the court fulfilled her request through a decision on 4 November 2010. About two weeks after the decision was released, Kurtubi resigned from his post as regent and was replaced by West Javanese government bureaucrat Asmudji H.W. Kurtubi managed to win the second election, this time with 49 percent of votes. Similar to before, Narulita attempted to dispute the results, but this time the court refused to accept her dispute and confirmed the results instead. Kurtubi was sworn in on 10 March 2011.

Immediately after winning the election, Kurtubi appointed his civil servant supporters to strategic posts in the government, while removing Narulita's supporters from the bureaucracy and placed them in less important positions. For example, Pandeglang's secretary of agricultural and husbandry agency was placed as an elementary school teacher in an impoverished village around the outskirts of Pandeglang. Kurtubi's term ended on 10 March 2016 and he was replaced by Pandeglang regional secretary Wahid Maulany.

Kurtubi died at Muhammadiyah Hospital in Bandung on 11 February 2023, at the age of 72. His body was interred at the Ar-Rahman Great Mosque cemetery, a cemetery for deceased regents of Pandeglang, a day later.
