= Abdul Aziz (Indonesian politician) =

Indonesian politician

Member of People's Representative Council
- In office 31 October 2018 – 1 October 2019
- Preceded by: Dimyati Natakusumah
- Constituency: Jakarta 3

Personal details
- Born: 4 June 1970 (age 54); Jakarta, Indonesia
- Political party: United Development Party

Abdul Aziz (born 4 June 1970) is an Indonesian politician who served as a member of the People's Representative Council from the United Development Party between 2018 and 2019. He was appointed by his party in 2018 to the position to replace the resigning Dimyati Natakusumah.

== Biography ==
Abdul Aziz was born in Jakarta on 4 June 1970 and completed his education there, obtaining a bachelor's degree from an economic higher education institute.

He was appointed to the People's Representative Council to replace Dimyati Natakusumah on 31 October 2018, as the latter changed parties to the Prosperous Justice Party. He became part of the body's sixth commission. In December 2018, he defended some state owned companies which were recording losses, noting that some of those companies were subsidising their products.
