= Cadasari =

Coordinates: 6°16′06″S 106°07′13″E

- Village and District
- Interactive map of Cadasari
- Country: Indonesia
- Province: Banten
- Regency: Pandeglang Regency

Area
  - Total: 26.20 km^{2} (10.12 sq mi)

Population (mid 2023 estimate)
  - Total: 38,283
  - Density: 1,461/km^{2} (3,784/sq mi)

Cadasari is a village and an administrative district (kecamatan) located in the northeast corner of Pandeglang Regency in Banten Province on Java, Indonesia. It covers an area of 26.20 km^{2} and had a population of 31,425 at the 2010 Census and 37,114 at the 2020 Census; the official estimate as of mid-2023 was 38,283. The administrative centre is in Cadasari village.

== Communities ==
Cadasari District is sub-divided into eleven rural villages (desa), all sharing the postcode 42251. These are listed below with their areas and their officially-estimated populations as of mid-2022.

Kode Wilayah	Name of desa	Area in km^{2}	Population mid 2022 estimate
36.01.22.2001	Kaduengang	2.00	2,685
36.01.22.2002	Pasirpeuteuy	2.00	2,085
36.01.22.2003	Kurungdahu	1.60	2,102
36.01.22.2004	Kaduela	2.46	1,818
36.01.22.2005	Koranji	2.27	2,957
36.01.22.2006	Tapos	3.63	4,165
36.01.22.2007	Cadasari (village)	2.42	7,990
36.01.22.2008	Ciinjuk	2.51	5,165
36.01.22.2009	Kaungcaang	2.86	3,861
36.01.22.2010	Cikentrung	2.45	2,496
36.01.22.2013	Tanagara	2.00	3,344
36.01.22	Totals	26.20	38,668 ^{(a)}

Notes: (a) comprising 20,176 males and 18,492 females.
