= Tinjil =

Island in Banten, Indonesia

Tinjil Pulau Tinjil (Indonesian)
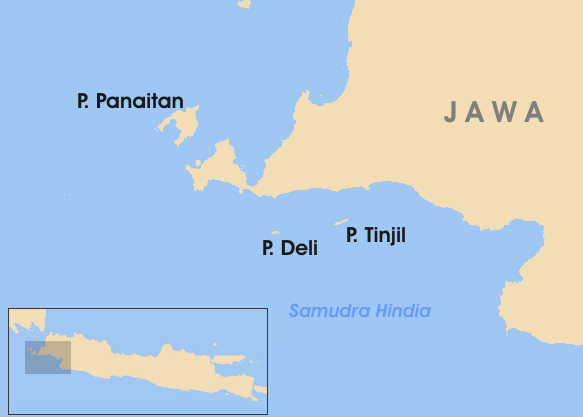

Geography
- Location: Southeast Asia
- Coordinates: 6°57′44″S 105°47′0″E
- Archipelago: Greater Sunda Islands

Administration
- Republic of Indonesia

Tinjil is a small island located in the Indian Ocean. Administratively, this island is included in the area of Pandeglang Regency, Banten.

Since 1988, Tinjil Island has been used as a natural breeding ground for long-tailed monkey species (Macaca fascicularis).

The existence of captive breeding of monkeys on this island causes people who come to visit must undergo a health check so as not to transmit the disease to the monkey population free of several types of pathogens or viruses, such as tuberculosis (TB) and simian retrovirus (SRV). Prospective visitors must undergo a health check in Muara Village, Cikerit Weta Village, Binuangen District before crossing to Tinjil Island.
