= Banjar, Pandeglang =

Banjar
- Village and District
- Interactive map of Banjar
- Country: Indonesia
- Province: Banten
- Regency: Pandeglang Regency

Area
  - Total: 30.50 km^{2} (11.78 sq mi)

Population (mid 2023 estimate)
  - Total: 36,576
  - Density: 1,199/km^{2} (3,106/sq mi)

Banjar is a village and an administrative district (kecamatan) located in the northeast corner of Pandeglang Regency in Banten Province on Java, Indonesia. It covers an area of 30.50 km^{2} and had a population of 20,780 at the 2010 Census and 35,459 at the 2020 Census; the official estimate as of mid-2023 was 36,576. The administrative centre is in Banjar village.

== Communities ==
Banjar District is sub-divided into eleven rural villages (desa), all sharing the postcode 42252. These are listed below with their areas and their officially-estimated populations as of mid-2022.

Kode Wilayah	Name of desa	Area in km^{2}	Population mid 2022 estimate
36.01.20.2002	Citalahab	4.19	4,819
36.01.20.2004	Kadulimus	2.53	4,705
36.01.20.2005	Bandung	1.29	1,874
36.01.20.2006	Mogana	2.42	2,236
36.01.20.2007	Banjar (village)	3.07	5,501
36.01.20.2008	Gunungputri	1.71	4,486
36.01.20.2010	Cibodas	3.69	2,667
36.01.20.2011	Kadebale	1.73	3,617
36.01.20.2012	Cibeureum	3.93	2,511
36.01.20.2013	Kadumaneuh	1.31	2,751
36.01.20.2014	Pasirawi	2.83	2,032
36.01.20	Totals	28.70	37,199 ^{(a)}

Notes: (a) comprising 19,172 males and 18,027 females.
