= Mandalawangi =

- Village and District
- Interactive map of Mandalawangi
- Country: Indonesia
- Province: Banten
- Regency: Pandeglang Regency

Area
  - Total: 80.19 km^{2} (30.96 sq mi)

Population (mid 2023 estimate)
  - Total: 57,028
  - Density: 711.2/km^{2} (1,842/sq mi)

Mandalawangi is a village and an administrative district (kecamatan) located in the northeast corner of Pandeglang Regency in Banten Province on Java, Indonesia. It covers an area of 80.19 km^{2} and had a population of 46,805 at the 2010 Census and 55,287 at the 2020 Census; the official estimate as of mid-2023 was 57,028. The administrative centre is in Cikoneng village.

== Communities ==
Mandalawangi District is sub-divided into fifteen rural villages (desa), all sharing the postcode 42261. These are listed below with their areas and their officially-estimated populations as of mid-2022.

Kode Wilayah	Name of desa	Area in km^{2}	Population mid 2022 estimate
36.01.17.2001	Pandat	3.53	4,852
36.01.17.2002	Cikoneng	3.49	4,956
36.01.17.2003	Nembol	3.20	4,910
36.01.17.2004	Kurungkambing	3.10	2,854
36.01.17.2005	Mandalawangi (village)	2.97	4,015
36.01.17.2006	Sinarjaya	2.34	4,965
36.01.17.2007	Sirnagalih	3.09	3,819
36.01.17.2008	Cikumbueun	7.12	4,152
36.01.17.2009	Ramea	5.73	4,078
36.01.17.2010	Gunungsari	2.46	3,768
36.01.17.2011	Panjangjaya	3.90	3,242
36.01.17.2012	Giripawana	3.41	4,073
36.01.17.2013	Mandalasari	4.56	2,662
36.01.17.2014	Curuglemo	4.74	2,933
36.01.17.2015	Pari	2.20	4,013
36.01.17	Totals	55.84	59,292 ^{(a)}

Notes: (a) comprising 30,398 males and 28,894 females.
