= Cipeucang =

Coordinates: 6°22′51″S 106°01′09″E

Cipeukang
- District
- Interactive map of Cipeukang
- Country: Indonesia
- Province: Banten
- Regency: Pandeglang Regency

Area
  - Total: 21.16 km^{2} (8.17 sq mi)

Population (mid 2023 estimate)
  - Total: 32,307
  - Density: 1,527/km^{2} (3,954/sq mi)

Cipeucang is an administrative district (kecamatan) located in the northeast corner of Pandeglang Regency in Banten Province on Java, Indonesia. It covers an area of 21.16 km^{2} and had a population of 28,033 at the 2010 Census and 31,321 at the 2020 Census; the official estimate as of mid-2023 was 32,307. The administrative centre is in Kadugadung village.

== Communities ==
Cipeucang District is sub-divided into ten rural villages (desa), all sharing the postcode 42272. These are listed below with their areas and their officially-estimated populations as of mid-2022.

Kode Wilayah	Name of desa	Area in km^{2}	Population mid 2022 estimate
36.01.15.2001	Palanyar	1.88	4,873
36.01.15.2002	Baturanjang	2.51	3,358
36.01.15.2003	Cikadueun	2.15	3,279
36.01.15.2004	Koncang	1.78	2,665
36.01.15.2005	Kadugadung	1.48	2,356
36.01.15.2006	Parumasan	2.53	2,640
36.01.15.2007	Curugbarang	2.05	4,588
36.01.15.2008	Kalanggunung	1.87	2,335
36.01.15.2009	Pasireurih	3.74	4,640
36.01.15.2010	Pasirmae	3.70	2,543
36.01.15	Totals	23.69	33,277 ^{(a)}

Notes: (a) comprising 17,352 males and 15,925 females.
