= Majasari =

- District
- Interactive map of Majasari
- Country: Indonesia
- Province: Banten
- Regency: Pandeglang Regency

Area
  - Total: 19.57 km^{2} (7.56 sq mi)

Population (mid 2023 estimate)
  - Total: 55,402
  - Density: 2,831/km^{2} (7,332/sq mi)

Majasari is an administrative district (kecamatan) located in the northeast corner of Pandeglang Regency in Banten Province on Java, Indonesia. It covers an area of 19.57 km^{2} and had a population of 46,126 at the 2010 Census and 53,711 at the 2020 Census; the official estimate as of mid-2023 was 55,402. The administrative centre is in Sukaratu kelurahan.

== Communities ==
Majasari District is sub-divided into five urban villages or towns (kelurahan). These are listed below with their areas and their officially-estimated populations as of mid-2022, together with their post codes.

Kode Wilayah	Name of kelurahan	Area in km^{2}	Population mid 2022 estimate	Post code
36.01.34.1001	Sukaratu	4.27	13,052	42217
36.01.34.1002	Karaton	1.91	8,795	42211
36.01.34.1003	Saruni	4.09	15,479	42216
36.01.34.1004	Pagerbatu	5.56	10,520	42215
36.01.34.1005	Cilaja	4.26	8,369	42214
36.01.34	Totals	20.09	56,215 ^{(a)}	

Notes: (a) comprising 29,192 males and 27,023 females.
