= Dimyati Natakusumah =

Indonesian politician (born 1966)

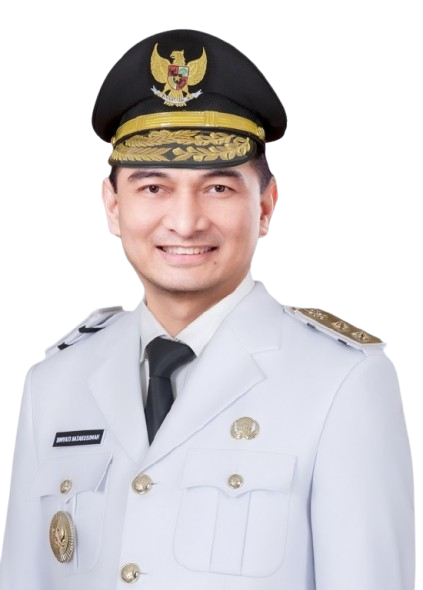
- Official portrait, 2025

Vice Governor of Banten
- Incumbent
- Assumed office 7 February 2025
- President: Prabowo Subianto
- Governor: Andra Soni
- Preceded by: Andika Hazrumy

Deputy Speaker of the People's Consultative Assembly
- In office 4 July 2014 – 1 October 2014
- Speaker: Sidarto Danusubroto
- Preceded by: Lukman Hakim Saifuddin

Member of the House of Representatives
- In office 1 October 2019 – 1 October 2024
- Constituency: Banten I
- In office 1 October 2009 – 31 October 2018
- Succeeded by: Abdul Aziz
- Constituency: Banten 1 I (2009–2014); Jakarta III (2014–2018)

25th Regent of Pandeglang
- In office 6 November 2000 – 28 October 2009
- Deputy: Mudjio (2000–2005); Erwan Kurtubi (2005–2009)
- Preceded by: Yitno
- Succeeded by: Erwan Kurtubi

Personal details
- Born: Achmad Dimyati Natakusumah; 17 September 1966 (age 60) Tangerang, Indonesia
- Party: PKS (since 2017)
- Other political affiliations: PPP (until 2017); KIM Plus (2024–present)
- Spouse: Irna Narulita
- Education: Esa Unggul University (S.H.); Pasundan University (M.H.); Padjadjaran University (Dr.); University of Indonesia (M.I.P.)

Achmad Dimyati Natakusumah (born 17 September 1966) is an Indonesian politician who served as a member of the House of Representatives between 2009–2018 and 2019–2024. Natakusumah was also the regent of Pandeglang Regency between 2000 and 2009.

Throughout his legislative career, he briefly served as the deputy speaker of the People's Consultative Assembly, and had been made a suspect in a bribery case although found not guilty. He was initially part of the United Development Party, but he moved to the Prosperous Justice Party in late 2017.

== Early life and education ==
Achmad Dimyati Natakusumah was born in Tangerang on 17 September 1966. He spent his first twelve years of education in Pandeglang, briefly studying in Perth before returning and getting his bachelor's degree in law from Esa Unggul University. Later, he gained a masters from Pasundan University and a doctorate from Padjadjaran University – all in law, and a masters in political science from the University of Indonesia.

== Early political career ==
Natakusumah had a background in business, and he was the head of West Java's young entrepreneurs' association (HIPMI) between 1995 and 2000.

=== Regent of Pandeglang ===
In 2000, he was elected as the regent of Pandeglang, with the support of PDI-P and PPP, the latter of which he was a member of. He was reelected in 2005 for his second term.

While regent, Natakusumah issued a decision which was to mandate the separation of male and female students at high schools, intended to minimize sexual encounters between the teenagers. He also enforced an alcohol ban and funded some free services and public buildings.

== House of Representatives ==
=== First term (2009–2014) ===
He later ran as a legislator in the 2009 Indonesian legislative election in Banten's 1st electoral district with the United Development Party (PPP) and won a seat, becoming part of its third commission and also holding the post of deputy chairman of its legislation committee. Later in 2009, he was arrested by the Banten Attorney for alleged bribery he committed in 2006. He was found not guilty by Pandeglang's State Court in 2010.

In July 2014, Natakusumah was appointed and sworn in as Deputy Speaker for the People's Consultative Assembly, replacing Lukman Hakim Saifuddin who became the Minister of Religious Affairs.

=== Second term (2014–2018) ===
Natakusumah won reelection in the 2014 election, winning 68,353 votes in Jakarta's 3rd electoral district. During a schism in PPP, he sided with Djan Faridz's faction and was named secretary general there, though he moved parties to the Prosperous Justice Party (PKS) in late 2017. Due to this, PPP replaced him in the council with Abdul Aziz.

=== Third term (2019–2024) ===
He ran in the 2019 legislative election under PKS from Banten's 1st electoral district, and was elected back into the legislature. However, he was not elected in 2024.

== Personal life ==
=== Family ===
Natakusumah is married to Irna Narulita, who also served as regent in Pandeglang and a member of the People's Representative Council between 2014 and 2016. Out of the couple's children, three ran in the 2019 legislative election, two of which in the same district as Natakusumah while running from different parties (one from the NasDem Party and one from the Democratic Party).
