= Karangtanjung =

- District
- Interactive map of Karangtanjung
- Country: Indonesia
- Province: Banten
- Regency: Pandeglang Regency

Area
  - Total: 19.07 km^{2} (7.36 sq mi)

Population (mid 2023 estimate)
  - Total: 38,593
  - Density: 2,024/km^{2} (5,242/sq mi)

Karangtanjung is an administrative district (kecamatan) located in the northeast corner of Pandeglang Regency in Banten Province on Java, Indonesia. It covers an area of 19.07 km^{2} and had a population of 32,364 at the 2010 Census and 37,315 at the 2020 Census; the official estimate as of mid-2023 was 38,593. The administrative centre is in Pagadungan kelurahan.

== Communities ==
Karangtanjung District is sub-divided into four urban villages or towns (kelurahan). These are listed below with their areas and their officially-estimated populations as of mid-2022. All share the post code 42213.

Kode Wilayah	Name of kelurahan	Area in km^{2}	Population mid 2022 estimate
36.01.25.1001	Kadumerak	2.40	8,681
36.01.25.1002	Cigadung	17.60	13,871
36.01.25.1003	Pagadungan	4.70	8,379
36.01.25.1014	Juhut	4.30	8,169
36.01.25	Totals	29.00	39,100 ^{(a)}

Notes: (a) comprising 20,151 males and 18,949 females.
