= Kaduhejo =

- District
- Interactive map of Kaduhejo
- Country: Indonesia
- Province: Banten
- Regency: Pandeglang Regency

Area
  - Total: 33.57 km^{2} (12.96 sq mi)

Population (mid 2023 estimate)
  - Total: 43,610
  - Density: 1,299/km^{2} (3,365/sq mi)

Kaduhejo is an administrative district (kecamatan) located in the northeast corner of Pandeglang Regency in Banten Province on Java, Indonesia. It covers an area of 33.57 km^{2} and had a population of 34,474 at the 2010 Census and 42,279 at the 2020 Census; the official estimate as of mid-2023 was 43,610. The administrative centre is in Sukasari village.

== Communities ==
Kaduhejo District is sub-divided into ten rural villages (desa), all sharing the postcode 42253. These are listed below with their areas and their officially-estimated populations as of mid-2022.

Kode Wilayah	Name of desa	Area in km^{2}	Population mid 2022 estimate
36.01.19.2001	Campaka	4.11	3,807
36.01.19.2002	Bayumundu	4.14	1,964
36.01.19.2003	Mandalasari	0.95	5,554
36.01.19.2004	Sukasari	2.20	6,683
36.01.19.2005	Saninten	7.50	6,851
36.01.19.2006	Palurahan	1.36	4,551
36.01.19.2007	Sukamanah	2.93	4,743
36.01.19.2008	Kadugemblo	1.43	2,583
36.01.19.2009	Banjarsari	1.50	2,400
36.01.19.2010	Ciputri	1.97	5,669
36.01.19	Totals	28.09	44,805 ^{(a)}

Notes: (a) comprising 23,087 males and 21,718 females.
