= Irna Narulita =

Indonesian politician

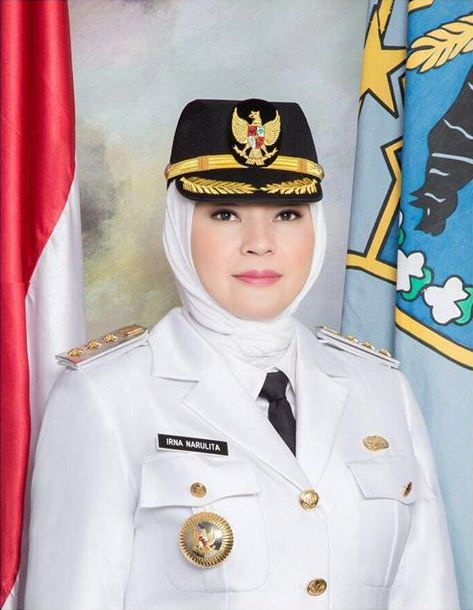

Regent of Pandeglang
- Incumbent
- Assumed office 26 April 2021
- Preceded by: Aah Wahid Maulany
- In office 23 March 2016 – 23 March 2021
- Preceded by: Erwan Kurtubi
- Succeeded by: Aah Wahid Maulany

Personal details
- Born: 23 July 1970 (age 56) Jakarta, Indonesia
- Citizenship: Indonesian
- Party: Indonesian Democratic Party of Struggle
- Spouse: Achmad Dimyati Natakusumah
- Education: Esa Unggul University

Irna Narulita (born 23 July 1970) is an Indonesian politician and the current regent of Pandeglang Regency. In 2017, she oversaw the regency's 143rd anniversary.

Her husband Dimyati Natakusumah had also served as the regent of Pandeglang. From 2014 to 2016, she was also a representative in the People's Representative Council.
