= Koroncong =

Coordinates: 6°17′26″S 106°09′35″E

- Village and District
- Interactive map of Koroncong
- Country: Indonesia
- Province: Banten
- Regency: Pandeglang Regency

Area
  - Total: 17.86 km^{2} (6.90 sq mi)

Population (mid 2023 estimate)
  - Total: 22,296
  - Density: 1,248/km^{2} (3,233/sq mi)

Koroncong is a village and an administrative district (kecamatan) located in the northeast corner of Pandeglang Regency in Banten Province on Java, Indonesia. It covers an area of 17.86 km^{2} and had a population of 17,643 at the 2010 Census and 21,615 at the 2020 Census; the official estimate as of mid-2023 was 22,296. The administrative centre is in Koroncong village.

== Communities ==
Koroncong District is sub-divided into eleven rural villages (desa), all sharing the postcode 42250. These are listed below with their areas and their officially-estimated populations as of mid-2022.

| Kode Wilayah | Name of desa | Area in km^{2} | Population mid 2022 estimate |
|---|---|---|---|
| 36.01.33.2001 | Sukajaya | 1.70 | 1,885 |
| 36.01.33.2002 | Awilega | 1.30 | 1,425 |
| 36.01.33.2003 | Gerendong | 1.20 | 1,419 |
| 36.01.33.2004 | Koroncong (village) | 1.14 | 1,907 |
| 36.01.33.2005 | Pakuluran | 2.00 | 2,864 |
| 36.01.33.2006 | Setrajaya | 1.10 | 2,457 |
| 36.01.33.2007 | Karangsetra | 1.50 | 1,528 |
| 36.01.33.2008 | Paniis | 2.32 | 2,411 |
| 36.01.33.2009 | Bangkonol | 1.10 | 2,789 |
| 36.01.33.2010 | Pasirjaksa | 1.04 | 1,636 |
| 36.01.33.2011 | Pasirkarag | 2.00 | 1,480 |
| 36.01.33.2012 | Tegalongok | 1.46 | 1,261 |
| 36.01.33 | Totals | 17.86 | 23,062 ^{(a)} |

Notes: (a) comprising 11,997 males and 11,065 females.
