= Mekarjaya =

- Village and District
- Interactive map of Mekarjaya
- Country: Indonesia
- Province: Banten
- Regency: Pandeglang Regency

Area
  - Total: 31.34 km^{2} (12.10 sq mi)

Population (mid 2023 estimate)
  - Total: 23,810
  - Density: 759.7/km^{2} (1,968/sq mi)

Mekarjaya is a village and an administrative district (kecamatan) located in the northeast corner of Pandeglang Regency in Banten Province on Java, Indonesia. It covers an area of 31.34 km^{2} and had a population of 19,016 at the 2010 Census and 23,083 at the 2020 Census; the official estimate as of mid-2023 was 23,810. The administrative centre is in Mekarjaya village.

== Communities ==
Mekarjaya District is sub-divided into eight rural villages (desa), all sharing the postcode 42279. These are listed below with their areas and their officially-estimated populations as of mid-2022.

Kode Wilayah	Name of desa	Area in km^{2}	Population mid 2022 estimate
36.01.30.2001	Kadubelang	3.04	4,227
36.01.30.2002	Pareang	2.15	3,938
36.01.30.2003	Wirasinga	4.40	3,726
36.01.30.2004	Rancabugel	3.97	2,232
36.01.30.2005	Kadujangkung	4.48	2,146
36.01.30.2006	Medong	4.34	3,706
36.01.30.2007	Sukamulya	2.83	1,943
36.01.30.2008	Mekarjaya (village)	4.14	2,536
36.01.30	Totals	29.35	24,454 ^{(a)}

Notes: (a) comprising 12,472 males and 11,982 females.
