= Java Sea =

Shallow sea in central Indonesia

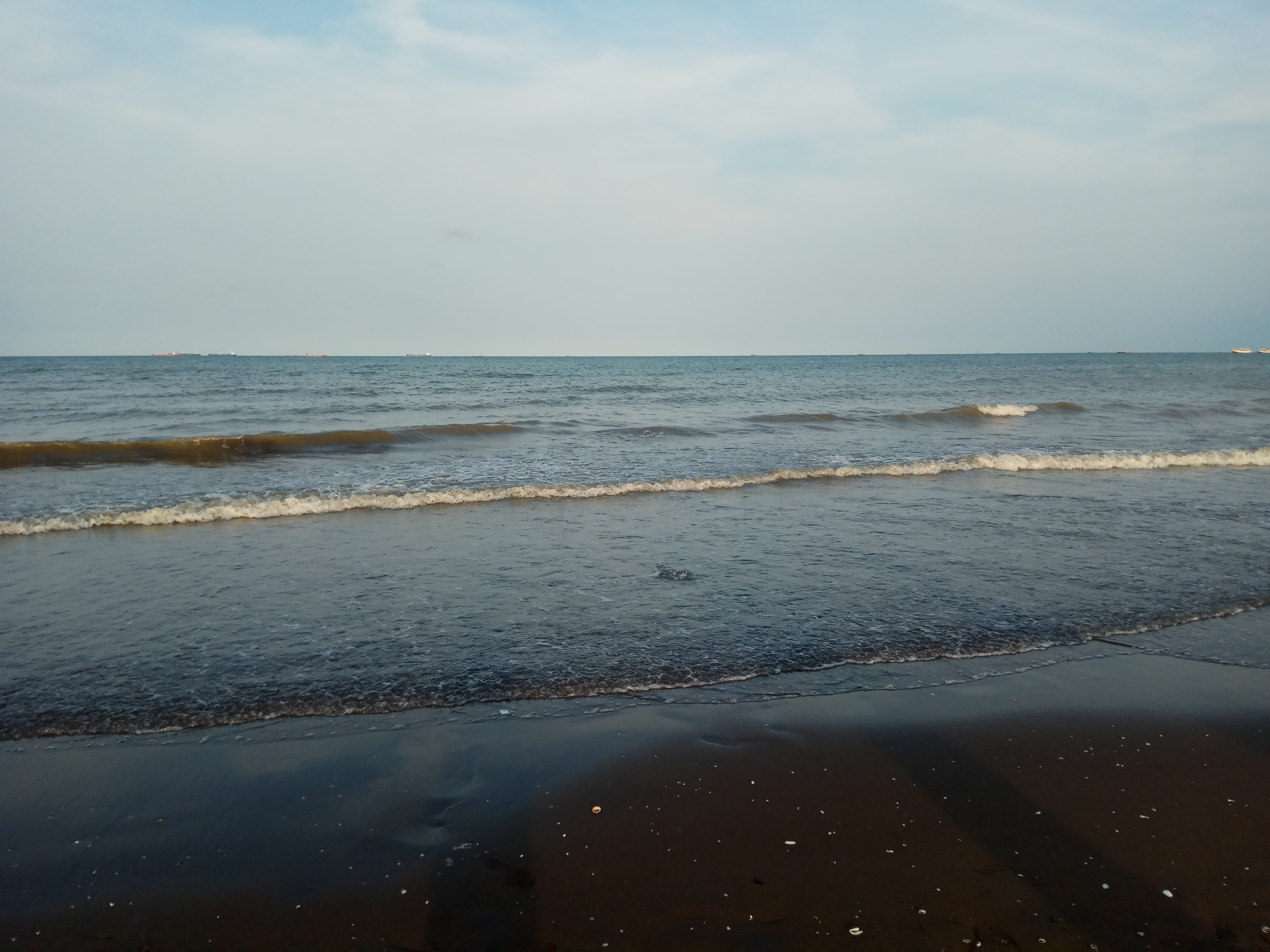
- Java Sea in Indramayu, West Java

- Location within Indonesia

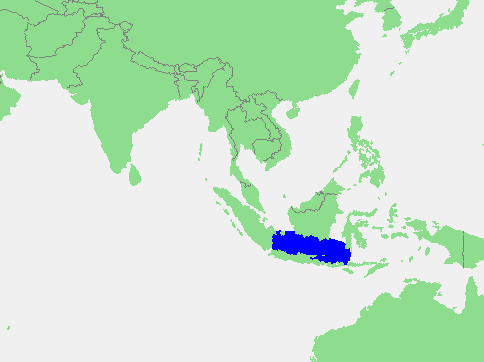
- Location of the Java Sea
- Location: Sunda Shelf
- Coordinates: 5°S 110°E
- Type: Sea
- Primary inflows: Barito, Bengawan Solo, Brantas, Ciliwung, Cimanuk, Citarum, Jeneberang, Kahayan, Musi, Seruyan River, Sampit River
- Basin countries: Indonesia
- Max. length: 1,600 km (990 mi)
- Max. width: 380 km (240 mi)
- Surface area: 320,000 km^{2} (120,000 sq mi)
- Average depth: 46 m (151 ft)
- Settlements: Batulicin, Cirebon, Jakarta, Jepara, Makassar, Pekalongan, Probolinggo, Semarang, Surabaya, Tanjung Pandan, Tegal, Toboali, Tuban

The Java Sea (Indonesian: Laut Jawa Javanese: Segara Jawa) is an extensive shallow sea in Indonesia. It lies on the Sunda Shelf, between the islands of Borneo to the north, Java to the south, Sumatra to the west, and Sulawesi to the east. The Karimata Strait to its northwest links it to the South China Sea. Although generally considered to be a part of the western Pacific Ocean, the Java Sea is occasionally considered to be a part of the Indian Ocean.

== Geography ==
The Java Sea covers the southern section of the 1,790,000 km^{2} (690,000 sq mi) Sunda Shelf. A shallow sea, it has a mean depth of 46 m (151 ft). It measures about 1,600 km (990 mi) east-west by 380 km (240 mi) north-south and occupies a total surface area of 320,000 km^{2} (120,000 sq mi).

It formed as sea levels rose at the end of the last ice age. Its almost uniformly flat bottom, and the presence of drainage channels (traceable to the mouths of island rivers), indicate that the Sunda Shelf was once a stable, dry, low-relief land area (peneplain) above which were left standing a few monadnocks (granite hills that, due to their resistance to erosion, form the present islands).

=== Extent ===
The International Hydrographic Organization (IHO) defines the Java Sea as one of the waters of the East Indian Archipelago, with the following criteria:

On the North. By the Southern limit of the South China Sea [Lucipara Point (3°14′S 106°05′E) thence to Tanjong Nanka, the Southwest extremity of Bangka Island, through this island to Tanjong Berikat the Eastern point (2°34′S 106°51′E), on to Tanjong Djemang (2°36′S 107°37′E) in Billiton, along the North coast of this island to Tanjong Boeroeng Mandi (2°46′S 108°16′E) and thence a line to Tanjong Sambar (3°00′S 110°19′E) the Southwest extreme of Borneo], the South coast of Borneo and the Southern limit of Makassar Strait [By a line from the Southwestern extreme of Celebes (5°37′S 119°27′E), through the Southern point of Tana Keke, to the Southern extreme of Laoet (4°06′S 116°06′E) thence up the West coast of that island to Tanjong Kiwi and thence across to Tanjong Petang, Borneo (3°37′S 115°57′E) at the Southern end of Laoet Strait].

On the East. By the Western limit of Flores Sea [A line from Tg Sarokaja (8°22′S 117°10′E) to the Western Paternoster island (7°26′S 117°08′E) thence to the Northeastern Postiljon Island (6°33′S 118°49′E) and to the West point of Laikang Bay, Celebes].

On the South. By the Northern and Northwestern limits of Bali Sea [A line from the Western Paternoster Island to the East point of Sepandjang and thence through this island to the West point of Gedeh Bay on the South coast of Kangean (7°01′S 115°18′E). A line from the West point of Gedeh Bay, Kangean Island, to Tg Sedano, the Northeast extreme of Java and down the East coast to Tg Bantenan, the Southeast extreme of the island], the North and West coasts of Java to Java Hoofd (6°46′S 105°12′E) its Western point, and thence a line to Vlakke Hoek (5°55′S 104°35′E) the Southern extreme of Sumatra.

On the West. The East coast of Sumatra between Vlakke Hoek and Lucipara Point (3°14′S 106°05′E).

== History ==
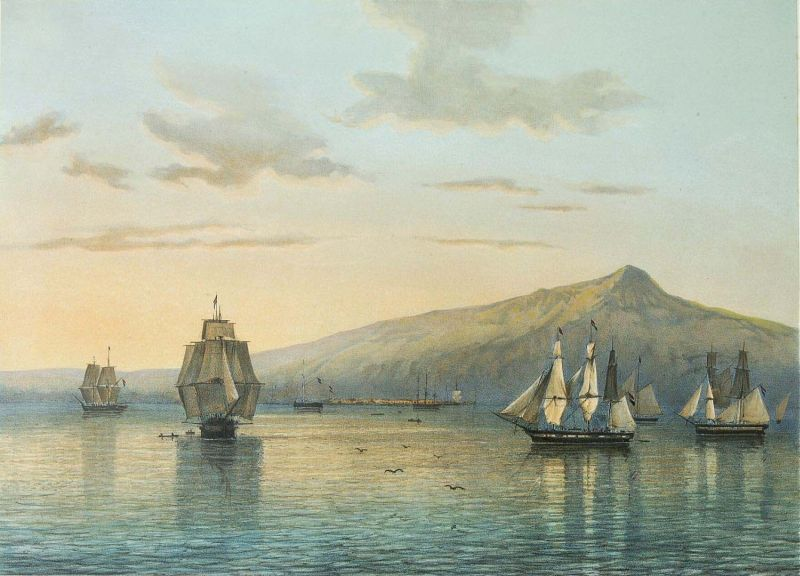
Coast of Java Sea off Anyer

The Battle of the Java Sea from February to March 1942, was one of the costliest naval battles of World War II. The naval forces of the Netherlands, Britain, Australia, and the United States were nearly destroyed trying to defend Java from Japanese attack.

=== Incident ===
On 28 December 2014, Indonesia AirAsia Flight 8501 crashed into the Java Sea while on route to Singapore from Surabaya, East Java. All 162 passengers and crew were killed.

On 29 October 2018, a Boeing 737 MAX 8 operating as Lion Air Flight 610 crashed into the Java Sea shortly after takeoff from Soekarno–Hatta International Airport in Jakarta heading towards Depati Amir Airport in Pangkal Pinang. All 189 passengers and crew on board died making it the first hull loss of a Boeing 737 MAX aircraft.

On 9 January 2021, a Boeing 737-500 (PK-CLC) operating as Sriwijaya Air Flight 182, crashed, near Laki Island, shortly after taking off from Soekarno–Hatta International Airport, en route to Supadio International Airport, with 50 passengers and 12 crew members aboard, leaving no survivors.

== Economic activities ==
The southern section of the seafloor has long been recognized as geologically similar to northern Java, where oil fields occur and extend under the sea. Prospects are also favorable for oil fields in the waters off southeast Kalimantan. As the site of successful exploration for petroleum and natural gas, the Java Sea has become the basis of Indonesia's national export program.

Fishing is an important economic activity in the Java Sea. Over 3,000 species of marine life are found in the area. A number of national parks exist in the area such as Karimunjawa. The Thousand Islands are located north of the national capital Jakarta, and are the city's only regency.

The area around the Java Sea is also a popular tourist destination. Scuba diving offers a chance to explore and photograph underwater caverns, wrecks, coral, sponges, and other marine life.
