= Panaitan =

Island in Banten, Indonesia

Coordinates: 6°34′31″S 105°12′36″E

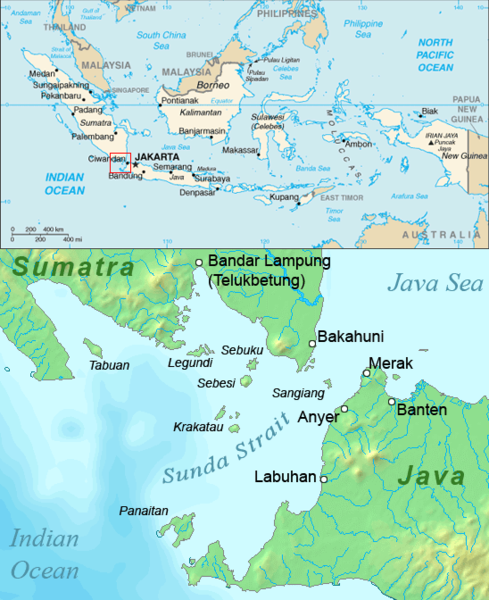
- The Sunda Strait - with Panaitan identified

Geography
- Location: Southeast Asia

Administration
- Indonesia
- Province: Banten
- Regency: Pandeglang

Additional information
- Time zone: IWST (UTC+07:00)

Panaitan (Prinsen, or Prince's Island; sometimes also Princess Island) (1450 m) is an island in the Sunda Strait, between Java and Sumatra, and in the Indonesian province of Banten. It is the largest island in the strait, and is located near the westernmost tip of Java (Java Head). Like the nearby Krakatoa, it too is volcanic in origin, although there are no known historic eruptions. The name 'Prince's Island' apparently is because the island was considered the property of Javan princes. Administratively, the island is a part of Pandeglang Regency.

Panaitan did not suffer as badly from the 1883 eruption of Krakatoa as many of the other islands in the area did, only the north and eastern parts of the island were hit by the tsunamis, and only about 55 bodies were found later. These included a hajji with royal permission to cut wood and about 50 squatters.

The island is the location of multiple world class surfing waves. It covers roughly 170 square kilometers.

Panaitan Island is a part of the wider Ujung Kulon National Park.
