= Andra Soni =

Indonesian politician

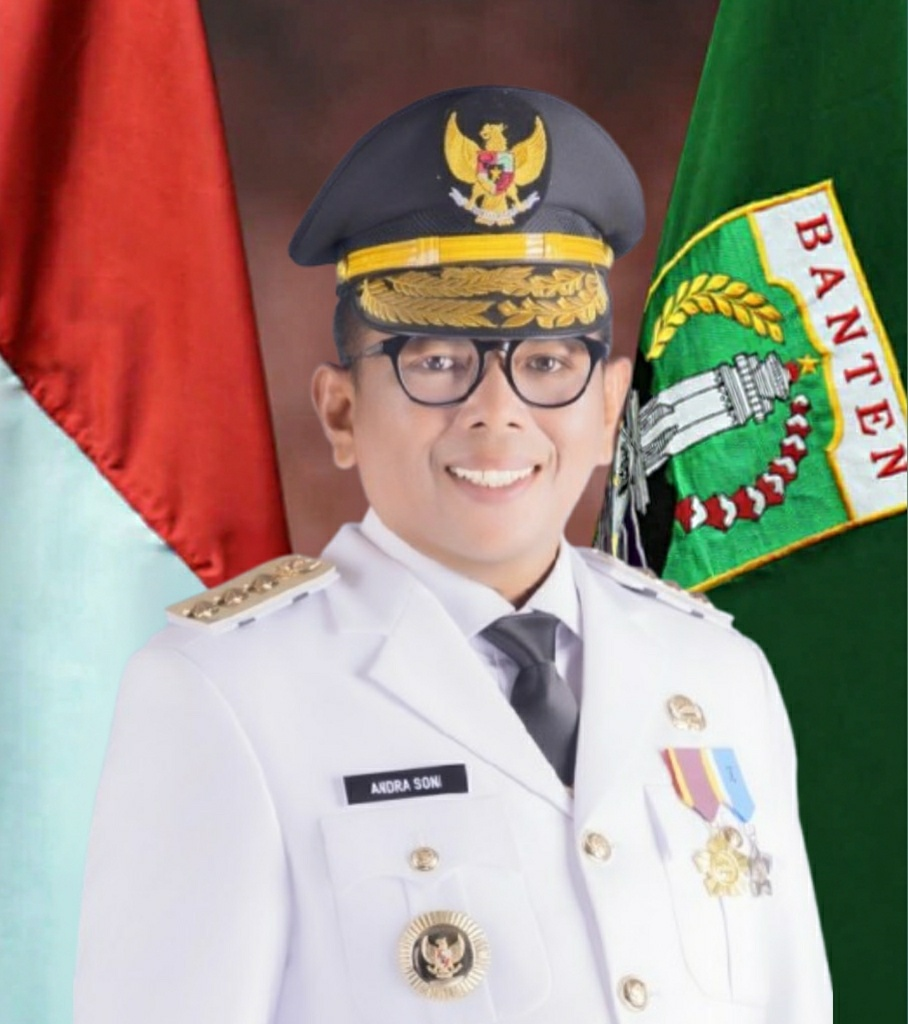
- Official portrait, 2025

5th Governor of Banten
- Incumbent
- Assumed office 20 February 2025
- President: Prabowo Subianto
- Deputy: Achmad Dimyati Natakusumah
- Preceded by: Wahidin Halim; Ucok Abdulrauf (act.)

Speaker of the Banten House of Representatives
- In office 30 September 2019 – 27 August 2024
- Deputy: Barhum H.S. Fahmi Hakim; Budi Prajogo; M. Nawa Said Dimyati
- Preceded by: Asep Rakhmatullah
- Succeeded by: Fahmi Hakim

Member of the Banten House of Representatives
- In office 1 September 2014 – 27 August 2024

Personal details
- Born: 12 August 1976 (age 49) Payakumbuh, West Sumatra, Indonesia
- Party: Gerindra
- Other political affiliations: KIM Plus (2024–present)
- Spouse: Tinawati
- Children: 3
- Parents: Zainal Abidin (father); Yasni (mother)
- Education: STIE Bhakti Pembangunan; STIE Banten; Sultan Ageng Tirtayasa University

Andra Soni (born 12 August 1976) is an Indonesian businessman and politician of the Gerindra party who is the 5th governor of Banten since February 2025. He was previously a member of Banten's provincial legislature in 2014–2024 and its speaker in 2019–2024. He originated from West Sumatra, moving to Tangerang as a teen before eventually starting a logistics company.

== Early life ==
Andra Soni was born to Zainal Abidin and Yasni on 12 August 1976 in Payakumbuh, West Sumatra. Zainal was a farmer, but later moved to Pekanbaru to work in construction before illegally immigrating to Malaysia to work at palm oil plantations there. Soni completed his elementary school in Malaysia before returning to Indonesia to continue his education. He moved to Ciledug in Tangerang and lived with his brother, completing high school with financial support from his landlord (a son of Indonesia's first interior minister Wiranatakusumah V).

== Business career ==
After completing high school, he began working as a courier at a company while continuing his studies. He eventually became a manager in the company before starting his own logistics company Antaran Sukses Express.

== Political career ==
=== Member of Parliament ===
According to Soni, he joined Gerindra in 2013 while accompanying a friend who was registering as a legislative candidate. He then took part in the 2014 Indonesian legislative election, and won a seat under Gerindra in the Banten Regional House of Representatives. He was reelected in the 2019 election, and was elected speaker of the legislature. He was reelected for a third term in 2024, but resigned before he was sworn in to run for governor of Banten. Within Gerindra, he had been chairman of the party's Tangerang branch before chairing its provincial Banten branch in 2023 after the death of its previous chair Desmond Junaidi Mahesa.

=== Governor of Banten ===
In 2024, Soni ran in Banten's gubernatorial election with Achmad Dimyati Natakusumah as his running mate. Among his campaign promises was an expansion of free education in the province, which would include non-public schools up to high school. Soni and Natakusumah won the election, defeating former South Tangerang mayor Airin Rachmi Diany with 3,102,501 votes (55.9%).

== Personal life ==
Soni is married to Tinawati, and the couple has three children, all sons.

== Honours ==
- Lencana Darma Bakti (Badge of Darma Melati)
- Lencana Pancawarsa I (Badge of Pancawarsa I)
