= Cimanuk =

Coordinates: 6°22′19″S 106°2′7″E

- Village and District
- Interactive map of Cimanuk
- Country: Indonesia
- Province: Banten
- Regency: Pandeglang Regency

Area
  - Total: 23.64 km^{2} (9.13 sq mi)

Population (mid 2023 estimate)
  - Total: 44,704
  - Density: 1,891/km^{2} (4,898/sq mi)

Cimanuk is a village and an administrative district (kecamatan) located in the northeast corner of Pandeglang Regency in Banten Province on Java, Indonesia. It covers an area of 23.64 km^{2} and had a population of 38,247 at the 2010 Census and 43,339 at the 2020 Census; the official estimate as of mid-2023 was 44,704. The administrative centre is in Batubantar village.

== Communities ==
Cimanuk District is sub-divided into eleven rural villages (desa), all sharing the postcode 42270. These are listed below with their areas and their officially-estimated populations as of mid-2022.

Kode Wilayah	Name of desa	Area in km^{2}	Population mid 2022 estimate
36.01.18.2001	Cimanuk (village)	2.67	5,834
36.01.18.2002	Batubantar	2.13	4,921
36.01.18.2003	Kadubungbang	2.76	5,887
36.01.18.2004	Kupahandap	1.51	3,401
36.01.18.2005	Dalembalar	1.64	3,940
36.01.18.2006	Kadumadang	1.70	4,754
36.01.18.2007	Rocek	2.26	4,754
36.01.18.2008	Kadudodol	1.93	3,720
36.01.18.2010	Gunungdatar	2.50	2,962
36.01.18.2013	Sekong	2.28	2,520
36.01.18.2015	Gunungcupu	2.26	2,607
36.01.18	Totals	23.64	45,300 ^{(a)}

Notes: (a) comprising 23,453 males and 21,847 females.
