= Pandeglang, Pandeglang =

Coordinates: 6°18′31″S 106°06′23″E

Pandeglang
- Town and district
- Interactive map of Pandeglang
- Country: Indonesia
- Province: Banten
- Regency: Pandeglang Regency

Area
  - Total: 16.85 km^{2} (6.51 sq mi)

Population (mid 2023 estimate)
  - Total: 45,279
  - Density: 2,687/km^{2} (6,960/sq mi)

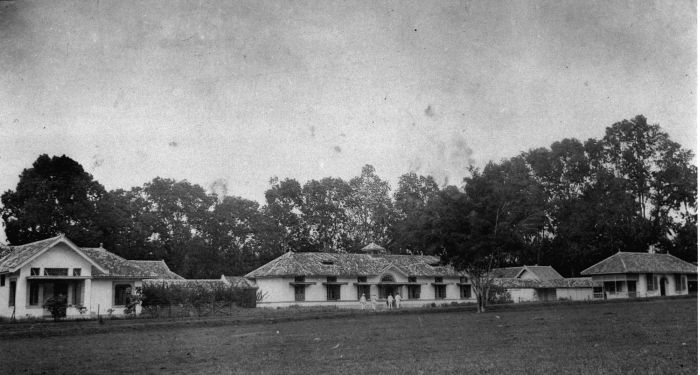
Front view of the hospital in Pandeglang

Pandeglang is a town (kelurahan) and an administrative district (kecamatan) located in the Pandeglang Regency of Banten Province on Java, Indonesia. Located in the northeast of the regency, it covers an area of 16.85 km^{2} and had a population of 44,039 at the 2010 Census and 43,897 at the 2020 Census; the official estimate as of mid-2023 was 45,279. The administrative centre is in Kabayan kelurahan.

== Communities ==
Pandeglang District is sub-divided into four urban villages or towns (kelurahan). These are listed below with their areas and their officially-estimated populations as of mid-2022, together with their post codes.

Kode Wilayah	Name of kelurahan	Area in km^{2}	Population mid 2022 estimate	Post code
36.01.21.1002	Kadomas	2.55	6,769	42218
36.01.21.1003	Babakan Kalanganyar	5.19	6,311	42219
36.01.21.1004	Kabayan	4.28	11,067	42212
36.01.21.1009	Pandeglang (town)	4.68	21,636	42211
36.01.21	Totals	16.70	45,783 ^{(a)}	

Notes: (a) comprising 23,459 males and 22,324 females.
