= Pandeglang Regency =

Regency in Banten, Indonesia

Pandeglang Regency Kabupaten Pandeglang
- Regency

Other transcription(s)
  - Sundanese: ᮊᮘᮥᮕᮒᮨᮔ᮪ ᮕᮔ᮪ᮓᮨᮌᮣᮀ
- Coat of arms

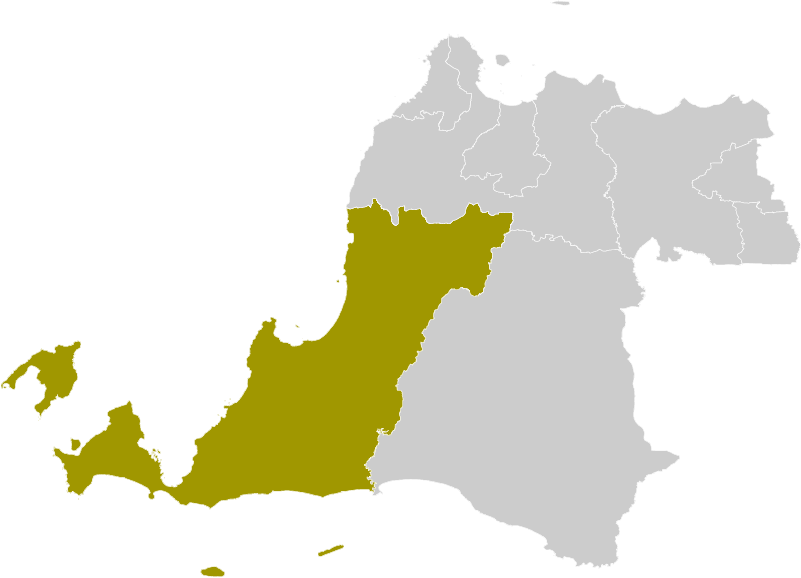
- Pandeglang Regency facing the Java Sea and Sumatra in Banten
- Coordinates: 6°18′33″S 106°6′17″E
- Country: Indonesia
- Province: Banten
- Regency seat: Pandeglang

Government
  - Regent: Dewi Setiani
  - Vice Regent: Iing Andri Supriadi

Area
  - Total: 2,746.81 km^{2} (1,060.55 sq mi)

Population (mid 2024 estimate)
  - Total: 1,437,046
  - Density: 523.169/km^{2} (1,355.00/sq mi)
- Time zone: UTC+7 (WIB)
- Website: pandeglangkab.go.id

Pandeglang Regency (Sundanese: Kabupatén Pandéglang; pronounced [kabuˌpat̪ɛn panˈdeɡlaŋ]) is a regency of Banten province, Indonesia. It is mainly located on the west and south coasts of the island of Java and is the most westerly regency on Java Island, but it also includes several offshore islands such as Panaitan, Peucang, Deli and Tinjil. It is bounded by Serang Regency to the north, Lebak Regency to the east, the Java Sea (part of the Indian Ocean) to the south, and the Sunda Strait (separating Java from Sumatra) to the west. The regency has a land area of 2,746.81 km^{2}, and a population at the 2010 Census of 1,149,610, rising to 1,272,687 at the 2020 Census; the official estimate as of mid-2024 was 1,437,046 (comprising 738,650 males and 698,396 females). The regency seat is the town of Pandeglang in the northeast of the regency, at the centre of a more densely populated region close to Greater Jakarta, while outside of that northeast agglomeration the principal centre is the town of Labuan on the west coast.

== Administrative districts ==
The Regency is divided into 35 districts (kecamatan), tabulated below with their areas and their populations at the 2010 Census and the 2020 Census, together with the official estimates as of mid-2024.

These are grouped geographically for convenience into 3 parts (without any administrative significance) - the relatively underpopulated southern group facing onto the Java Sea but including the renowned Ujung Kulon National Park, with 45.3% of the regency's land area, but only 13.4% of its inhabitants; a middle group including 43.1% of the land area and 53.8% of its population; and a northeast group centered on the urbanised Pandeglang, Majasari and Karangtanjung Districts, with just 11.65% of the regency's land area but with 32.75% of its population.

The table also includes the locations of the district administrative centres, the number of administrative villages in each district (totaling 326 rural desa and 13 urban kelurahan - the latter comprising the urban centres of Pandeglang, Majasari and Karangtanjung Districts, all in the northeast corner of the regency), and their postal codes.

Kode Wilayah	Name of District (kecamatan)	Area in km^{2}	Pop'n Census 2010	Pop'n Census 2020	Pop'n Estimate mid 2024	Admin centre	No. of villages	Post codes
36.01.01	Sumur ^{(a)}	258.54	22,754	25,502	28,265	Sumberjaya	7	42283
36.01.02	Cimanggu	259.73	36,634	37,871	43,893	Cimanggu	12	42284
36.01.03	Cibaliung	221.88	28,781	30,787	34,381	Sukajadi	9	42285
36.01.27	Cibitung	180.72	21,180	21,836	24,834	Cikadu	10	42287
36.01.04	Cikeusik ^{(b)}	322.76	51,012	52,542	61,462	Cikeusik	14	42286
	Southern sector	1,243.63	160,351	168,538	192,835		52	
36.01.05	Cigeulis	176.21	33,856	35,772	41,798	Cigeulis	9	42282
36.01.06	Panimbang ^{(c)}	132.84	48,910	52,372	60.486	Panimbang Jaya	6	42281
36.01.35	Sobang	138.80	35,034	37,235	41,947	Sobang	8	42280
36.01.08	Munjul	75.25	22,176	24,576	28,386	Pasanggrahan	9	42275
36.01.07	Angsana	64.84	25,578	27,579	32,025	Angsana	9	42277
36.01.31	Sindangresmi	65.20	21,259	23,055	26,430	Sindangresmi	9	42276
36.01.11	Picung	56.74	35,120	38,088	43,477	Kadupandak	9	42275
36.01.10	Bojong	50.72	33,570	36,149	41,259	Citumenggung	8	42274
36.01.14	Saketi	54.13	42,955	46,782	53,289	Kadudampit	14	42278
36.01.23	Cisata	32.65	23,371	25,291	28,637	Pasiureurih	9	42273
36.01.09	Pagelaran	42.76	33,943	37,907	43,200	Pagelaran	13	42265
36.01.24	Patia	45.48	27,242	28,715	33,241	Patia	10	42266
36.01.29	Sukaresmi	57.30	33,817	37,116	41,568	Sukaresmi	10	42267
36.01.12	Labuan ^{(d)}	15.66	53,861	55,980	62,273	Sukamaju	9	42260
36.01.28	Carita	41.87	32,035	33,981	38,710	Carita	10	42264
36.01.16	Jiput	53.04	28,395	32,738	37,565	Sukacai	13	42263
36.01.26	Cikedal	26.00	30,395	33,949	38,218	Dahu	10	42271
36.01.13	Menes	22.41	35,274	39,822	44,462	Purwaraja	12	42262
36.01.32	Pulosari	31.33	27,486	32,522	36,588	Karyawangi	9	42254
	Central sector	1,183.23	620,307	679,629	773,559		200	
36.01.17	Mandalawangi	80.19	46,805	55,287	62,647	Cikoneng	15	42261
36.01.18	Cimanuk	23.64	38,247	43,339	47,391	Batubantar	11	42270
36.01.15	Cipeucang	21.16	28,033	31,321	35,002	Kadugadung	10	42272
36.01.20	Banjar	30.50	29,780	35,459	38,974	Banjar	11	42252
36.01.19	Kaduhejo	33.57	34,474	42,279	47,347	Sukasari	10	42253
36.01.30	Mekarjaya	31.34	19,016	23,083	25,734	Mekarjaya	8	42279
36.01.21	Pandeglang	16.85	44,039	43,897	47,552	Kabayan	4 ^{(e)}	42211: 42219
36.01.34	Majasari	19.57	46,126	53,711	59,995	Sukaratu	5 ^{(f)}	42211: 42217
36.01.22	Cadasari	26.20	31,425	37,114	40,388	Cadasari	11	42251
36.01.25	Karangtanjung	19.07	32,364	37,415	41,063	Pagadungan	4 ^{(g)}	42213
36.01.33	Koroncong	17.86	17,643	21,615	24,559	Koroncong	12	42250
	Northeast sector	319.95	368,952	424,520	470,652		87	
	Totals for Regency	2,746.81	1,149,610	1,272,687	1,437,046	Pandeglang	339	

Notes: (a) including 32 offshore islands, mainly in the Sunda Strait between Java and Sumatra (of which the largest is Panaitan Island or Pulau Panaitan), together with the large Ujung Kulon peninsula and offshore Peucang Island, in the far southwest of Java. 94.82% of the district's land area (603.62 km^{2}) is administratively in the desa of Ujungjaya (with 4,528 inhabitants in 2023), which includes the National Park.
(b) including the two small offshore islands of Pulau Deli and Pulau Tinjil, both south of Java. (c) including the small offshore island of Pulau Liwungan. (d) including the small offshore island of Pulau Popole.
(e) comprising the 4 kelurahan of Babakan Kalanganyar, Kabayan, Kadomas and Pandeglang.
(f) comprising the 5 kelurahan of Cilaja, Karaton, Pagerbatu, Saruni and Sukaratu.
(g) comprising the 4 kelurahan of Cigadung, Juhut, Kadumerak and Pagadungan.

== Tourism ==
The regency contains the Ujung Kulon National Park, covering 497.59 km^{2}, including the entirety of the large peninsula in the southwest corner of the regency, together with most of the offshore islands including Panaitan Island and Peucang Island, and famous for its single-horned Javan rhinoceros and crocodiles. It also includes Carita Beach, Tanjung Lesung Beach Resort and the public Bodur Beach (also in Tanjung Lesung).

== Special Economic Zone ==
Based on Government Regulation (PP) No. 26/2012, PT Jababeka Tbk has been mandated to develop a Special Economic Zone in Tanjung Lesung. It is located 170 kilometers from Jakarta, via the Jakarta–Tangerang Toll Road, then the Tangerang–Merak Toll Road, and finally the small road to Tanjung Lesung, taking in all 4 to 5 hours. So, the company will build an 83-kilometer highway from Serang to Panimbang, because building a toll road will be difficult with the land acquisitions. An airstrip in Panimbang is also being considered because from there it only needs 10 minutes to reach Tanjung Lesung. The company has acquired partners to build a Cruise Port in a 50 hectares area, which will be built soon.

== Climate ==
Pandeglang has a tropical rainforest climate (Af) with heavy rainfall year-round. The following climate data is for the town of Pandeglang.

Climate data for Pandeglang
Month	Jan	Feb	Mar	Apr	May	Jun	Jul	Aug	Sep	Oct	Nov	Dec	Year
Mean daily maximum °C (°F)	29.5 (85.1)	29.9 (85.8)	30.6 (87.1)	31.0 (87.8)	31.3 (88.3)	31.2 (88.2)	31.2 (88.2)	31.4 (88.5)	31.8 (89.2)	31.8 (89.2)	31.3 (88.3)	30.6 (87.1)	31.0 (87.7)
Daily mean °C (°F)	25.3 (77.5)	25.6 (78.1)	26.0 (78.8)	26.2 (79.2)	26.4 (79.5)	26.1 (79.0)	25.7 (78.3)	25.8 (78.4)	26.2 (79.2)	26.4 (79.5)	26.3 (79.3)	26.0 (78.8)	26.0 (78.8)
Mean daily minimum °C (°F)	21.2 (70.2)	21.4 (70.5)	21.4 (70.5)	21.5 (70.7)	21.6 (70.9)	21.0 (69.8)	20.3 (68.5)	20.2 (68.4)	20.6 (69.1)	21.1 (70.0)	21.4 (70.5)	21.5 (70.7)	21.1 (70.0)
Average rainfall mm (inches)	327 (12.9)	276 (10.9)	249 (9.8)	239 (9.4)	216 (8.5)	126 (5.0)	129 (5.1)	129 (5.1)	163 (6.4)	222 (8.7)	267 (10.5)	279 (11.0)	2,622 (103.3)
Source: Climate-Data.org
