= List of 2018 deaths in popular music =

This is a list of notable performers of rock music and other forms of popular music, and others directly associated with the music as producers, songwriters, or in other closely related roles, who died in 2018.

== 2018 deaths in popular music ==
Preceded by 2017	List of deaths in popular music 2018	Succeeded by 2019

Name	Age	Date	Location	Cause of death
Betty Willis	76	January 1, 2018	Santa Ana, California, U.S.	Strangled
Rick Hall; Record producer	85	January 2, 2018	Muscle Shoals, Alabama, U.S.	Prostate cancer
Ray Thomas; Moody Blues	76	January 4, 2018	Surrey, England	Prostate cancer
Fujioka Mikio; Babymetal	36	January 5, 2018	Japan	Accidental fall
Chris Tsangarides; Record producer from Judas Priest, Depeche Mode	61	January 6, 2018	England	Heart failure following pneumonia
Jimmy Robinson; Recording engineer, record producer	67	January 6, 2018	New York City, New York, U.S.	
France Gall	70	January 7, 2018	Neuilly-sur-Seine, France	Cancer
Denise LaSalle	83	January 8, 2018	Jackson, Tennessee, U.S.	Complications from fall
Eddie Clarke; Motörhead, Fastway	67	January 10, 2018	London, UK	Pneumonia
Ernest H. Sanders; German-born American musicologist	99	January 13, 2018	New York, U.S.	
Barbara Cope; Groupie	67	January 14, 2018	Dallas, Texas, U.S.	House fire
Marlene VerPlanck	84	January 14, 2018	Manhattan, New York, U.S.	Pancreatic cancer
Edwin Hawkins	74	January 15, 2018	Pleasanton, California, U.S.	Pancreatic cancer
Dolores O'Riordan; The Cranberries	46	January 15, 2018	London, England	Drowning caused by alcohol intoxication
Dave Holland; Trapeze, Judas Priest	69	January 16, 2018	Lugo, Spain	Lung cancer
Fredo Santana	27	January 20, 2018	Reseda, Los Angeles, California, United States	Seizure
Terry Evans	80	January 20, 2018	Los Angeles, California, United States	
Jim Rodford; Argent, The Kinks, The Zombies	76	January 20, 2018	St Albans, England	Complications from fall
Hugh Masekela	78	January 23, 2018	Johannesburg, South Africa	Prostate cancer
Lari White	52	January 23, 2018	Nashville, Tennessee, U.S.	Peritoneal cancer
Mark E. Smith; The Fall	60	January 24, 2018	Prestwich, Greater Manchester, England	Lung and kidney cancer
Buzz Clifford	76	January 26, 2018	Berwyn, Illinois, United States	Complications of influenza
Gianni Casciello Musician, multi-instrumentalist and composer	84	January 30, 2018	Venice, Italy	
Leah LaBelle	31	January 31, 2018	Studio City, California, United States	Traffic collision
Dennis Edwards; The Temptations	74	February 1, 2018	Chicago, Illinois, U.S.	Complications from meningitis
Leon "Ndugu" Chancler; Record producer and university professor	65	February 3, 2018	Los Angeles, California, U.S.	Prostate cancer
Zeno Roth; Uli Jon Roth	61	February 5, 2018	Düsseldorf, Germany	
John Perry Barlow; Lyricist for The Grateful Dead, co-founder of the Electronic Frontier Foundation and the Freedom of the Press Foundation	70	February 6, 2018	San Francisco, California, U.S.	Complications from heart attack
Mickey Jones; Kenny Rogers and the First Edition	76	February 7, 2018	Simi Valley, California, U.S.	Diabetes
Pat Torpey; Mr. Big	64	February 7, 2018	Southern California Area, U.S.	Complications of Parkinson's disease
Lovebug Starski; Record producer for DJ Hollywood	57	February 8, 2018	Las Vegas, Nevada, U.S.	Heart attack
Craig MacGregor; Foghat	68	February 9, 2018	Wyomissing, Pennsylvania, U.S.	Lung cancer
Wesla Whitfield	70	February 9, 2018	St. Helena, California, United States	
Jóhann Jóhannsson	48	February 9, 2018	Berlin, Germany	Likely cocaine use
Troy Blakely; Record producer for Scorpions, Poison, Red Hot Chili Peppers	68	February 10, 2018	U.S.	Cancer
Vic Damone	89	February 11, 2018	Miami Beach, Florida, U.S.	Natural causes
Daryle Singletary	46	February 12, 2018	Lebanon, Tennessee, U.S.	Blood Clot
Scott Boyer; Cowboy	70	February 13, 2018	Muscle Shoals, Alabama, U.S.	Peripheral artery disease
Little Sammy Davis	89	February 13, 2018	Middletown, New York, U.S.	
Sergio Della Monica Bassist, guitarist and co-founder of the group Planet Funk	58	February 17, 2018	Rome, Italy	Pneumonia complications
Wim Claes; Record producer	56	February 24, 2018	Haacht, Belgium	
Harvey Schmidt	88	February 28, 2018	Tomball, Texas, U.S.	Congestive heart failure
Bill Burkette; The Vogues	75	March 1, 2018	Jeannette, Pennsylvania, U.S.	Unknown
Van McLain; Shooting Star	62	March 2, 2018	Kansas City, Missouri, United States	West Nile virus
Virgilijus Noreika; Lithuanian Pop singer and member of 3 Tigrai	82	March 3, 2018	Vilnius, Lithuania	Cancer
Patrick Doyle; Veronica Falls	32	March 3, 2018	Los Angeles, California, U.S.	Suicide
Jeff St John	71	March 6, 2018	Perth, Western Australia	Infection following surgery
Jerzy Milian	82	March 7, 2018	Katowice, Poland	Natural causes
Milko Kelemen	93	March 8, 2018	Stuttgart, Germany	Natural causes
Ken Dodd	90	March 11, 2018	Knotty Ash, Liverpool, England	Chest infection
Craig Mack	47	March 12, 2018	Walterboro, South Carolina, U.S.	Heart failure
Nokie Edwards; The Ventures	82	March 12, 2018	Yuma, Arizona, U.S.	Complications following hip surgery
Claudia Fontaine; Afrodiziak	57	March 13, 2018	UK	
Charlie Quintana; The Plugz, Social Distortion, Izzy Stradlin & the Ju Ju Hounds	56	March 13, 2018	Cancún, Mexico	Heart attack
Jimmy Wisner	86	March 13, 2018	Livingston, New Jersey, United States	
Buell Neidlinger; Cecil Taylor, Frank Zappa, Duane Eddy	82	March 16, 2018	Whibey Island, Washington D.C., United States	Unknown
Killjoy; Necrophagia	48	March 18, 2018	East Liverpool, Ohio, United States	Undisclosed causes
Peter "Mars" Cowling; Pat Travers Band, Flying Hat Band	71	March 20, 2018	U.S.	
Lys Assia winner of the first Eurovision Song Contest	94	March 24, 2018	Zollikerberg, Zürich, Switzerland	
Mike Harrison; Spooky Tooth	75	March 25, 2018	Carlisle, England	
Seo Min-woo; 100%	33	March 25, 2018	Gangnam District, Seoul, South Korea	Cardiac arrest
Jerry Williams	75	March 25, 2018	Täby, Sweden	Cancer
Caleb Scofield; Cave In, Old Man Gloom, Zozobra	39	March 28, 2018	Bedford, New Hampshire, U.S.	Traffic collision
Alias; Record producer from Anticon Records	41	March 30, 2018	South-Portland, U.S.	Heart attack
Michel Sénéchal French tenor	91	April 1, 2018	Eaubonne, France	
Ron Dunbar; Record producer	78	April 3, 2018	Fresno, California, United States	
Cecil Taylor	89	April 5, 2018	Brooklyn, New York City, U.S.	
Enzo Jannace Italian singer of popular and melodic music	82	April 20, 2018	Naples, Italy	
Avicii	28	April 20, 2018	Muscat, Oman	Suicide
Bob Dorough	94	April 23, 2018	Mount Bethel, Pennsylvania, U.S.	
Kato Khandwala; Record producer from Blondie, Paramore, My Chemical Romance, The Pretty Reckless	47	April 25, 2018	North Hollywood, Los Angeles, California, U.S.	Traffic collision
Charles Neville; The Neville Brothers	79	April 26, 2018	Huntington, Massachusetts, U.S.	
John "Jabo" Starks; The J.B.'s	80	May 1, 2018	Mobile, Alabama, U.S.	
Tony Cucchiara Singer-songwriter, actor and prolific playwright, famous for bringing musicals to Italy	80	May 2, 2018	Rome, Italy	
Maria Paris Appreciated interpreter of classical Neapolitan song, winner of the Naples Festival in 1955	85	May 3, 2018	Naples, Italy	
Lara Saint Paul Italian singer, active since the sixties	73	May 8, 2018	Casalecchio di Reno, Bologna, Italy	Intestinal cancer
Scott Hutchison; Frightened Rabbit	36	May 9, 2018	South Queensferry, Edinburgh, Scotland	Suicide by drowning
Phil Emmanuel	65	May 24, 2018	Parkes, New South Wales, Australia	
María Dolores Pradera	93	May 28, 2018	Madrid, Spain	
Eddy Clearwater	83	June 1, 2018	Skokie, Illinois, U.S.	Heart failure
Ralph Santolla; Obituary, Deicide, Iced Earth	51	June 6, 2018	Tampa, Florida, U.S.	Heart attack
Danny Kirwan; Fleetwood Mac, Tramp	68	June 8, 2018	London, England	
Gino Santercole Singer-songwriter, composer and actor, author of famous songs for Adriano Celentano and for himself	77	June 8, 2018	Rome, Italy	
Jon Hiseman; Colosseum, Colosseum II, Tempest, John Mayall's Bluesbreakers, The Graham Bond Organisation	73	June 12, 2018	Sutton, London, England	Brain cancer
D. J. Fontana	87	June 13, 2018	Nashville, Tennessee, U.S.	
Matt "Guitar" Murphy	88	June 15, 2018	Miami, Florida, United States	Heart attack
XXXTentacion	20	June 18, 2018	Deerfield Beach, Florida, United States	Shot
Jimmy Wopo	21	June 18, 2018	Hill District, Pittsburgh, Pennsylvania, United States	shot
Vinnie Paul Abbott; Pantera, Damageplan, Hellyeah	54	June 22, 2018	Las Vegas, Nevada, United States	Heart attack
Alan Longmuir; Bay City Rollers	70	July 2, 2018	Edinburgh, Scotland	
Richard Swift American singer-songwriter	41	July 3, 2018	Tacoma, Washington, United States	
Jim Malloy; Record producer	87	July 5, 2018	Nashville, Tennessee, United States	
Henry Butler	69	July 2, 2018	New York City, New York, U.S.	Cancer
Oli Herbert All That Remains	44	July 10, 2018	Stafford Springs, Connecticut, United States	Drowning
Stan Lewis; Record producer from Jewel Records	91	July 15, 2018	Shreveport, Louisiana, U.S.	
Olga Jackowska; Maanam	67	July 28, 2018	Bliżów, Poland	Ovarian cancer
Oliver Dragojević	70	July 29, 2018	Split, Croatia	
Mindaugas Remeikis; Member of Mexicano	36	August 6, 2018	Lithuania	Unknown
Lidia Martorana Italian singer	89	August 8, 2018	Turin, Italy	
Jason "J-Sin" Luttrell; Vocalist for Primer 55	40	August 10, 2018	Southaven, Mississippi, West Virginia, U.S.	Hepatitis C
Randy Rampage; Annihilator	58	August 14, 2018	Vancouver, Canada	Heart attack
Jill Janus; Huntress	42	August 14, 2018	Portland, Oregon, U.S.	Suicide
Fabio Melanitto; Uff	33	August 15, 2018	Narvarte Poniente, Mexico City, Distrito Federal, Mexico	Gunshot
Aretha Franklin	76	August 16, 2018	Detroit, Michigan, U.S.	Pancreatic cancer
Danny Pearson	65	August 17, 2018	Stonewall, Mississippi, U.S.	Liver cancer
Claudio Lolli Italian singer-songwriter and writer	68	August 17, 2018	Bologna, Italy	Long illness
Ed King; Lynyrd Skynyrd, Strawberry Alarm Clock	68	August 22, 2018	Nashville, Tennessee, U.S.	Lung cancer
Lazy Lester	85	August 22, 2018	Paradise, California, U.S.	Stomach cancer
Kyle Pavone; We Came as Romans	28	August 25, 2018	Royal Oak, Michigan, U.S.	Drug overdose
Conway Savage; Nick Cave and the Bad Seeds	58	September 2, 2018	Melbourne, Victoria, Australia	Brain tumour
Katyna Ranieri Italian singer and actress	93	September 2, 2018	Rome, Italy	
Don Gardner	87	September 4, 2018	Philadelphia, Pennsylvania, U.S.	
Mac Miller	26	September 7, 2018	Los Angeles, California, U.S.	Drug overdose
Maartin Allcock; Fairport Convention	61	September 16, 2018	London, UK	Liver cancer
Big Jay McNeely	91	September 16, 2018	Moreno Valley, California, U.S.	Prostate cancer
Goran Kuzminac Italian singer-songwriter and guitarist	65	September 18, 2018	Trento, Italy	Long illness
Chas Hodges; Chas & Dave, Cliff Bennett and the Rebel Rousers, The Outlaws, Heads Hands & Feet	74	September 22, 2018	England	Organ failure
Marty Balin; Jefferson Airplane, Jefferson Starship	76	September 27, 2018	Tampa, Florida, U.S.	
Otis Rush	84	September 29, 2018	Chicago, Illinois, U.S.	Stroke
Kim Larsen; Gasolin'	72	September 30, 2018	Odense, Denmark	Prostate cancer
Charles Aznavour	94	October 1, 2018	Alpilles, France	Cardiac arrest
Stelvio Cipriani Italian musician and composer	81	October 1, 2018	Rome, Italy	
Geoff Emerick; Record engineered from Abbey Road Studios, The Beatles	72	October 2, 2018	Los Angeles, California, U.S.	Heart attack
Paola Bertoni Melodic singer active in the 1960s and winner of the Castrocaro Festival in 1962	75	October 5, 2018	Ravenna, Italy	
John Wicks; The Records	65	October 7, 2018	Burbank, California, U.S.	Pancreatic cancer
Takehisa Kosugi	80	October 12, 2018	Ashiya, Hyōgo, Japan	
Gianni La Commare Italian singer	80	October 23, 2018	Civita Castellana, Italy	
Wah Wah Watson; The Funk Brothers	67	October 24, 2018	Santa Monica, California, U.S.	
Tony Joe White	75	October 24, 2018	Nashville, Tennessee, U.S.	Heart attack
Todd Youth; Agnostic Front, Danzig	47	October 27, 2018	Los Angeles, California	
Jimmy Farrar; Molly Hatchet	67	October 29, 2018	LaGrange, Georgia, U.S.	Heart failure
Hardy Fox; The Residents	73	October 30, 2018	San Anselmo, California, U.S.	Glioblastoma (Brain cancer)
Josh Fauver; Deerhunter	39	November 2, 2018	Atlanta, Georgia, U.S.	
Glenn Schwartz; James Gang, Pacific Gas & Electric, All Saved Freak Band	78	November 2, 2018	U.S.	
John Manners; Ray Brown & the Whispers	77	November 5, 2018	Sydney, Australia	Undisclosed
Hugh McDowell; Electric Light Orchestra	65	November 6, 2018	London, UK	Cancer
Scott Harrick; The Arbors	81	November 7, 2018	Ajijic, Jalisco, Mexico	Stroke
Roy Clark	85	November 15, 2018	Tulsa, Oklahoma, U.S.	Pneumonia
Devin Lima; LFO	41	November 21, 2018	Boston, Massachusetts, U.S.	Adrenal cancer
Jody Williams	83	December 1, 2018	Munster, Indiana, U.S.	Cancer
Pete Shelley; The Buzzcocks	63	December 6, 2018	Tallinn, Estonia	Heart attack
Nancy Wilson	81	December 13, 2018	Pioneertown, California, U.S.	
Joe Osborn; The Wrecking Crew	81	December 14, 2018	Greenwood, Louisiana, U.S.	
Herman Sikumbang; Seventeen	36	December 22, 2018	Tanjung Lesung, Banten, Indonesia	Drowned from Sunda Strait Tsunami 2018
M. Awal "Bani" Purbani; Seventeen	36	December 22, 2018	Tanjung Lesung, Banten, Indonesia	Drowned from Sunda Strait Tsunami 2018
Windu Andi Harmawan; Seventeen	36	December 24, 2018	Pandeglang Regency, Indonesia	Drowned from Sunda Strait Tsunami 2018
Jerry Riopelle; Record producer	77	December 24, 2018	Tampa, Florida, United States	Cancer
James Calvin Wilsey; Avengers	61	December 24, 2018	Los Angeles, California, U.S.	Multiple organ failure
Jaja Fiastri Famous lyricist and playwright, author of the texts of unforgettable musical comedies by the Garinei and Giovannini company	84	December 28, 2018	Rome, Italy	Long illness
Adelio Cogliati Italian lyricist and record producer	70	December 29, 2018	Milan, Italy	Heart attack during the night
Dean Ford; Marmalade	73	December 31, 2018	Los Angeles, California, U.S.	Parkinson's disease
Ray Sawyer; Dr. Hook	81	December 31, 2018	Daytona Beach, Florida, U.S.	

== See also ==
- List of murdered hip hop musicians
- 27 Club
