= Aa Jimmy =

Indonesian actor and comedian (1983–2018)

- Born: Heriyanto; 15 January 1983; Tasikmalaya, West Java, Indonesia
- Died: 22 December 2018 (aged 35); Tanjung Lesung, Banten, Indonesia
- Occupations: Actor, comedian

Heriyanto, also known as Aa Jimmy (15 January 1983 – 22 December 2018), was an Indonesian actor and comedian.

== Biography ==
Heriyanto was of Sundanese-Arab-Betawi blood. He was familiarly called Argo and was more widely known as Aa Jimmy, because his face resembled that of Abdullah Gymnastiar. He first gained notability after playing in the Jaka Baret comedy show in 2006 on a private television station.

In 2009, he joined the comedy group Teamlo as a vocalist, accompanied by Wawan Bakwan, Ade Dora and Kudil. After Teamlo disbanded, he and Ade Dora formed a comedy duo group called Jigo.

He died on 22 December 2018 from the Sunda Strait tsunami, aged 35.

== Filmography ==
=== Film ===
- Asoy Geboy (2008) - Hilman
- Janda Kembang (2009) - Pak Ustad
- King (2009)
- Enak Sama Enak (2012)
- Soekarno: Independent Indonesia (2013)
- Seputih Cinta Melati (2014)
- Shy Shy Cat (2016) - Penghulu
- Jomblo (remake) (2017) - Himself
- Udah Putusin Aja! (2018) - (final film role)

=== Television ===
- RT Sukowi
- Jagoan Silat
