= List of 2017 deaths in popular music =

This is a list of notable performers of rock music and other forms of popular music, and others directly associated with the music as producers, songwriters, or in other closely related roles, who died in 2017.

== 2017 deaths in popular music ==
Preceded by 2016	List of deaths in popular music 2017	Succeeded by 2018

Name	Age	Date	Location	Cause of death
Mike Gaborno; Manic Hispanic	51	January 4, 2017	Orange County, California, United States	Liver cancer
Johnny Dick; Fanny Adams, Wild Cherries	73	January 6, 2017	Coffs Harbour, New South Wales, Australia	
Sylvester Potts; The Contours	78	January 6, 2017	Detroit, Michigan, U.S.	Alzheimer's disease
Eddie Kamae; Sons of Hawaii	89	January 7, 2017	Honolulu, Hawaii, U.S.	
Jerzy Kossela; Czerwone Gitary	74	January 7, 2017	Gdynia, Poland	
Donatella Bianconi Italian singer and pianist	88	January 7, 2017	Rome, Italy	
Buddy Bregman; American arranger, record producer, conductor and composer	86	January 8, 2017	Los Angeles, California, U.S.	Alzheimer's disease
Peter Sarstedt	75	January 8, 2017	Sussex, England, UK	Progressive supranuclear palsy
Vincenzo "Enzo" Carella talian singer-songwriter	65	January 8, 2017	Rome, Italy	Cardiac arrest after a long stay in intensive care
Crazy Toones; Record producer	45	January 9, 2017	Los Angeles, California, U.S.	Heart attack
Tommy Allsup; Buddy Holly & The Crickets	85	January 11, 2017	Springfield, Missouri, U.S.	Complications from a hernia operation
Tony Booth; Poster artist for The Beatles	83	January 11, 2017	Upton, Merseyside, England	Cancer
Larry Steinbachek; Bronski Beat	56	January 12, 2017	Amsterdam, Netherlands	Cancer
Meir Banai	56	January 12, 2017	Hemed, Israel	Cancer
Muhammad Fachroni; Project Pop	44	January 13, 2017	Kopo Elok, Bandung, West Java, Indonesia	Complications from diabetes
Richie Ingui; Soul Survivors	70	January 13, 2017	Philadelphia, Philadelphia County, Pennsylvania, U.S.	Heart failure
Magic Alex; Electronics engineer for The Beatles	74	January 13, 2017	Kolonaki, Athens, Greece	Pneumonia
Charles "Bobo" Shaw	69	January 16, 2017	Saint Louis, Missouri, U.S.	
Franz Jarnach; The Rattles	73	January 16, 2017	Hamburg, Germany	
Mike Kellie; Multi-instrumentalist and record producer for Spooky Tooth, The Only Ones	69	January 18, 2017	Lisbon, Portugal	
Loalwa Braz	63	January 19, 2017	Saquarema, Rio de Janeiro, Brazil	Murdered
Howard Kaufman; Talent manager for Eagles, Aerosmith, Def Leppard	79	January 19, 2017	Los Angeles, California	
Ronald “Bingo” Mundy; The Marcels	76	January 20, 2017	Pittsburgh, Pennsylvania, U.S.	Pneumonia
Joey Powers	82	January 20, 2017	Washington, Pennsylvania, U.S.	
Maggie Roche; The Roches	65	January 21, 2017	New York City, United States	Cancer
Walter Morrison; Record producer for Ohio Players and music director of Parliament-Funkadelic	62	January 21, 2017	London, England	
Jaki Liebezeit; Can	78	January 22, 2017	Cologne, Germany	Pneumonia
Pete Overend Watts; Mott the Hoople, British Lions	69	January 22, 2017	Birmingham, England	Throat cancer
Bobby Freeman	76	January 23, 2017	San Francisco, California, U.S.	Natural causes
Bimba Bosé Spanish model, singer and actress naturalized Italian	41	January 23, 2017	Madrid, Spain	Breast cancer with metastasis
Gil Ray; Game Theory, The Loud Family	60	January 24, 2017	Albany, California (in the San Francisco Bay Area), United States	Cancer
Björn Thelin; The Spotnicks	74	January 24, 2017	Ängelholm, Skåne County, Southwestern Sweden	
Butch Trucks; The Allman Brothers Band	69	January 24, 2017	West Palm Beach, Florida, U.S.	Suicide by gunshot
Benny Collins; Tour manager for The Rolling Stones, Journey	68	January 27, 2017	Greenbrae, California, United States	Pneumonia
Guitar Gable	79	January 28, 2017	Opelousas, Louisiana, U.S.	
Geoff Nicholls; Black Sabbath	68	January 28, 2017	Birmingham, England	Lung cancer
Elkin Ramírez; Kraken	54	January 29, 2017	Medellín, Antioquia, Colombia	Brain cancer
James Laurence; Record producer for Friendzone	27	January 30, 2017	England, UK	
Deke Leonard; Man, Help Yourself	72	January 31, 2017	Llanelli, South Wales	Heart failure
John Wetton; Asia, Roxy Music, Uriah Heep, King Crimson, Wishbone Ash	67	January 31, 2017	Bournemouth, England	Cancer
Robert Dahlqvist; The Hellacopters, Dundertåget	40	February 3, 2017	Bagarmossen, Sweden	Accidental drowning following seizure
Steve Lang; April Wine	67	February 4, 2017	Montreal, Quebec, Canada	Parkinson’s disease
Noel Simms	81	February 4, 2017	Alligator Reef, Florida, U.S.	Lung cancer
David Axelrod	85	February 5, 2017	Burbank, California, U.S.	Lung cancer
Sonny Geraci; The Outsiders, Climax	70	February 5, 2017	Cleveland, Ohio, U.S.	
Ennio Sangiusto Italian singer	79	February 5, 2017	Milan, Italy	
Tony Särkkä; Abruptum, Ophthalamia	44	February 8, 2017	Finspång, Sweden	Alleged suicide
Rina Matsuno; Shiritsu Ebisu Chugaku	18	February 8, 2017	Tokyo, Japan	Cardiac arrhythmia
Tony Davis; The Spinners	86	February 10, 2017	Great Sankey, Warrington, England	
Harvey Lichtenstein; American arts administrator for Brooklyn Academy of Music	87	February 11, 2017	Manhattan, New York City, New York, Uniited States	Stroke
Damian	52	February 12, 2017	Tameside, UK	Cancer
Robert Fisher; Willard Grant Conspiracy	59	February 12, 2017	Boston, Massachusetts, United States	Cancer
Al Jarreau	76	February 12, 2017	Los Angeles, California, U.S.	Respiratory failure
Giusto Pio Italian violinist and composer	91	February 12, 2017	Castelfranco Veneto, Treviso, Italy	
Trish Doan; Kittie	31	February 13, 2017	Surfers Paradise, Gold Coast, Queensland, Australia	Suicide
Alan Aldridge; Artist and graphic designer	78	February 17, 2017	Los Angeles, California, U.S.	
Peter Skellern	69	February 17, 2017	Lanteglos-by-Fowey, Cornwall, England	Brain cancer
David Yorko; Guitarist for Johnny and the Hurricanes	73	February 17, 2017	Waterville, Ohio, United States	Emphysema
Clyde Stubblefield	73	February 18, 2017	Madison, Wisconsin, U.S.	Kidney failure
Larry Coryell; The Eleventh House	73	February 19, 2017	New York City, New York, U.S.	Heart failure
Ilene Berns; Record producer, record company director and co-founded of Bang Records	73	February 23, 2017	Miami, Florida, U.S.	Heart failure
Leon Ware; Record producer	77	February 23, 2017	Marina del Rey, California, U.S.	Prostate cancer
Kurt Wehowski Singer, member of the group vocal Poker di Voci	94	February 23, 2017	Albenga, Savona, Italy	
Eric Miller; Record producer for Pablo Records	75	February 25, 2017	Los Angeles, California, U.S.	Heart attack
Toshio Nakanishi; Plastics	61	February 25, 2017	Tokyo, Japan	Esophageal cancer
Leone Di Lernia Italian singer-songwriter and radio host	78	February 28, 2017	Milan, Italy	
Hiroshi Kamayatsu; The Spiders	78	March 1, 2017	Tokyo, Japan	Pancreatic cancer
Jim Fuller; The Surfaris	69	March 3, 2017	Monrovia, California, U.S.	Undisclosed
Tommy Page; Music industry executive from Reprise Records	49	March 3, 2017	East Stroudsburg, Pennsylvania, U.S.	Suicide by hanging
Edi Fitzroy	61	March 4, 2017	May Pen, Clarendon Parish, Jamaica	
Ritchie Adams	78	March 6, 2017	New York City, New York, U.S.	
Lars Diedricson; Snowstorm	55	March 6, 2017	Gothenburg, Sweden	
Robbie Hoddinoff; Kingfish	62	March 6, 2017	San Francisco, California, United States	
Kalika Prasad Bhattacharya	56	March 7, 2017	Hooghly district, West Bengal, India	Traffic accident
Tony Lorenzo; Sons of Azrael	30	March 9, 2017	Buffalo, New York, United States	Complications from paralysis
Joni Sledge; Sister Sledge	60	March 10, 2017	Phoenix, Arizona, U.S.	Natural causes
Evan Johns; The LeRoi Brothers	60	March 11, 2017	Austin, Texas, U.S.	Liver disease
Joey Alves; Y&T	63	March 12, 2017	San Lorenzo, California, United States	Complications from ulcerative colitis
Tommy LiPuma; Record producer	80	March 13, 2017	New York City, New York, U.S.	
John Lever; The Chameleons	55	March 13, 2017	Greater Manchester Area, North West England, UK	
James Cotton	81	March 16, 2017	Austin, Texas, U.S.	Pneumonia
Chuck Berry	90	March 18, 2017	Wentzville, Missouri, U.S.	Heart attack
Kęstutis Lušas; Member of Rondo	59	March 21, 2017	Lithuania	Unknown
Billy Bland	84	March 22, 2017	New York City, New York, U.S.	
Sib Hashian; Boston	67	March 22, 2017	At sea near Nassau, Bahamas	Heart attack
Sven-Erik Magnusson; Sven-Ingvars	74	March 22, 2017	Karlstad, Sweden	Prostate cancer
Jimmy Dotson	83	March 26, 2017	Houston, Texas, U.S.	
Clem Curtis; The Foundations	76	March 27, 2017	Olney, England, UK	Lung cancer
Edward Grimes; Rachel's, Shipping News	43	March 27, 2017	Louisville, Kentucky, U.S.	
Arthur Blythe	76	March 27, 2017	Lancaster, California, U.S.	Parkinson's disease
Aldo Guibovich; Los Pasteles Verdes	64	March 29, 2017	Chimbote, Peru	Brain tumor
Lonnie Brooks	83	April 1, 2017	Chicago, Illinois, U.S.	
Brenda Jones; The Jones Girls	62	April 2, 2017	Wilmington, Delaware, United States	Traffic accident
Paul O'Neill; Record producer for Trans-Siberian Orchestra	61	April 5, 2017	Tampa, Florida, U.S.	Intoxication of prescription drugs
David Peel; The Lower East Side Band	74	April 6, 2017	Manhattan, New York, U.S.	Heart attack
Joseph Rascoff; Tour manager from U2, The Rolling Stones	71	April 6, 2017	Los Angeles, California, U.S.	Prostate cancer
Kim Plainfield	63	April 8, 2017	Tomkins Cove, New York, U.S.	
Keni Richards; Autograph	60	April 8, 2017	U.S.	Murdered
Banner Thomas; Molly Hatchet	60	April 10, 2017	Orange Park, Florida, United States	Pneumonia
J. Geils; The J. Geils Band	71	April 11, 2017	Groton, Massachusetts, U.S.	Natural causes
Tom Coyne; Mastering engineer	63	April 12, 2017	U.S.	Multiple myeloma
Toby Smith; Jamiroquai	46	April 12, 2017	London, England	Cancer
Mika Vainio; Pan Sonic	57	April 12, 2017	Trouville-sur-Mer, France	Multiple myeloma
Sylvia Moy; Record producer	78	April 15, 2017	Dearborn, Michigan, U.S.	Pneumonia
Matt Holt; Nothingface	39	April 15, 2017	Frederick, Maryland, U.S.	Undisclosed degenerative illness
Allan Holdsworth; Soft Machine, U.K.	70	April 16, 2017	Vista, California, U.S.	Heart disease
Gianni Boncompagni Italian television host, lyricist, radio host, composer, television director, comedian and radio director	84	April 16, 2017	Rome, Italy	Long illness
Pat Fitzpatrick; Aslan	60	April 19, 2017	Glenageary, County Dublin, Ireland	Liver cancer
Cuba Gooding Sr; The Main Ingredient	72	April 20, 2017	Woodland Hills, California, U.S.	Natural causes
Sandy Gallin; American talent agent	76	April 21, 2017	Los Angeles, California, U.S.	Multiple myeloma
Calep Emphrey Jr.	67	April 25, 2017	U.S.	
Rino Zurzolo Italian double bass player	58	April 30, 2017	Naples, Italy	
Bruce Hampton; Col. Bruce Hampton and the Aquarium Rescue Unit, Hampton Grease Band	70	May 1, 2017	Atlanta, Georgia, U.S.	Heart attack
Kevin Garcia; Grandaddy	41	May 2, 2017	Modesto, California, U.S.	Stroke
Saxa; The Beat	87	May 3, 2017	Birmingham, England	
Christopher Boykin; Entertainer from Rob & Big	45	May 9, 2017	Plano, Texas, U.S.	Heart failure
Robert Miles	47	May 9, 2017	Ibiza, Spain	Cancer
Jimmy Copley; Manfred Mann's Earth Band	63	May 13, 2017	Bristol, England	Leukemia
Kevin Stantion; Mi-Sex	61	May 17, 2017	Australia	Cervical spondylitis
Chris Cornell; Soundgarden, Audioslave, Temple of the Dog	52	May 18, 2017	Detroit, Michigan, U.S.	Suicide by hanging
Frankie Paul	51	May 18, 2017	Kingston, Jamaica	
Jimmy Hayes; The Persuasions	74	May 18, 2017	New York, New York, U.S.	Died during surgery
Kid Vinil; Record producer	62	May 19, 2017	São Paulo, Brazil	
Jimmy LaFave	61	May 21, 2017	Austin, Texas, U.S.	Spindle cell sarcoma
Gregg Allman; The Allman Brothers Band	69	May 27, 2017	Richmond Hill, Georgia, U.S.	Liver cancer
Aamir Zaki; Vital Signs	49	June 2, 2017	Karachi, Pakistan	Heart failure
Vin Garbutt	69	June 6, 2017	Middlesbrough, UK	Heart failure
Sandra Reemer; Sandra & Andres	66	June 6, 2017	Amsterdam, Netherlands	Breast cancer
Rosalie Sorrels	83	June 11, 2017	Reno, Nevada, U.S.	
Prodigy; Mobb Deep	42	June 20, 2017	Las Vegas, Nevada, U.S.	Accidental choking
Gunter Gabriel	75	June 22, 2017	Hanover, Germany	Fall
Jimmy Nalls; Sea Level	66	June 22, 2017	Nashville, Tennessee, U.S.	Fall
Dave Rosser; The Afghan Whigs, The Twilight Singers	50	June 27, 2017	New Orleans, Louisiana, United States	Colon cancer
Gary DeCarlo; Steam	75	June 28, 2017	Branford, Connecticut, U.S.	Lung cancer
Rudy Rotta	66	July 3, 2017	Verona, Italy	
John Blackwell	43	July 4, 2017	Land o' Lakes, Florida, U.S.	Brain tumor
Melvyn "Deacon" Jones; Baby Huey & the Babysitters	73	July 6, 2017	Hollywood, California, U.S.	
Ray Phiri	70	July 12, 2017	Nelspruit, South Africa	Lung cancer
Simon Holmes; The Hummingbirds	54	July 13, 2017	Sydney, Australia	
Fresh Kid Ice; 2 Live Crew	53	July 13, 2017	Miami, Florida, U.S.	Cirrhosis of the liver
David Zablidowsky; Adrenaline Mob, Trans-Siberian Orchestra, SOTO, ZO2	38	July 14, 2017	Micanopy, Florida, U.S.	Traffic accident
Roland Cazimero; The Brothers Cazimero	66	July 16, 2017	U.S.	
Thor Lindsay; Record producer for Tim/Kerr	58	July 16, 2017	Portland, Oregon, United States	
Harun Kolçak	62	July 19, 2017	Maslak, Sarıyer, Istanbul	
Chester Bennington; Linkin Park, Dead by Sunrise, Stone Temple Pilots	41	July 20, 2017	Los Angeles, California, U.S.	Suicide by hanging
Kenny Shields; Streetheart	69	July 21, 2017	Winnipeg, Manitoba, Canada	Complications from cardiac surgery
Bobby Taylor; Bobby Taylor & the Vancouvers	83	July 22, 2017	Hong Kong	Cancer
Michael Johnson	72	July 25, 2017	Minneapolis, Minnesota, U.S.	
Billy Joe Walker Jr.	65	July 25, 2017	Kerrville, Texas, U.S.	
Goldy McJohn; Steppenwolf	72	August 1, 2017	Burien, Washington, U.S.	Heart attack
Tony Cohen; Record producer for The Birthday Party, Nick Cave and the Bad Seeds	60	August 2, 2017	Dandenong, Victoria, Australia	
Glen Campbell	81	August 8, 2017	Nashville, Tennessee, U.S.	Alzheimer's disease
Gianna Spagnulo Italian singer	77	August 10, 2017	Rome, Italy	
Benard Ighner	72	August 14, 2017	Houston, Texas, U.S.	Lung cancer
Sonny Burgess	88	August 18, 2017	Little Rock, Arkansas, U.S.	Complications from a fall
Maria Pozzi (Margot) Singer-songwriter active between the 1960s and 1970s	75	August 23, 2017	Genoa, Italy	
Melissa Bell; Soul II Soul	53	August 28, 2017	London, England	Kidney failure
Skip Prokop; Lighthouse, The Paupers	73	August 30, 2017	St. Thomas, Ontario, Canada	
Walter Becker; Steely Dan	67	September 3, 2017	Manhattan, New York, U.S.	Esophageal cancer
Dave Hlubek; Molly Hatchet	66	September 3, 2017	Jacksonville, Florida, U.S.	Heart attack
Earl Lindo; The Wailers	64	September 4, 2017	London, England	
Holger Czukay; Can	79	September 5, 2017	Weilerswist, Germany	Natural causes
Rick Stevens; Tower of Power	77	September 5, 2017	U.S.	Liver cancer
Troy Gentry; Montgomery Gentry	50	September 8, 2017	Medford, New Jesey, United States	Helicopter accident
Michael Friedman; In association of The Civilians	41	September 9, 2017	Manhattan, New York, U.S.	HIV/AIDS
Virgil Howe; Little Barrie	41	September 11, 2017	London, England	Heart attack
Will Youatt; Man, Neutrons	67	September 12, 2017	Swansea, Wales	
Jessi Zazu; Those Darlins	28	September 12, 2017	Nashville, Tennessee, U.S.	Cervical cancer
Grant Hart; Hüsker Dü	56	September 14, 2017	Minneapolis, Minnesota, U.S.	Liver cancer
Mark Selby	56	September 18, 2017	Nashville, Tennessee, U.S.	Cancer
Billy Hatton; Bass guitarist for The Fourmost	76	September 19, 2017	Liverpool, England	Unknown
Johnny Sandlin; Record producer for The Allman Brothers Band	72	September 19, 2017	Decatur, Arkansas, U.S.	Cancer
Cecs Bergman; Record producer for Catapult	65	September 21, 2017	Leimuiden, South Holland, Netherlands	
Ammon Tharp; Drummer for Bill Deal and the Rhondels	75	September 22, 2017	Virginia Beach, Virginia, United States	Undisclosed cause
Charles Bradley	68	September 23, 2017	Brooklyn, New York, U.S.	Stomach cancer
CeDell Davis	91	September 27, 2017	Hot Springs, Arkansas, U.S.	Heart attack
Frank Slay; Record producer, and record label owner	87	September 30, 2017	San Diego, California, U.S.	
Tom Petty; Tom Petty and the Heartbreakers, Mudcrutch, Traveling Wilburys	66	October 2, 2017	Santa Monica, California, U.S.	Cardiac arrest
Jerry Ross; Record producer and co-founder of Heritage Records	84	October 4, 2017	Meadowbrook, Pennsylvania, U.S.	Prostate cancer
Bunny Sigler; Record producer	76	October 6, 2017	Philadelphia, Pennsylvania, U.S.	Heart attack
Jimmy Beaumont; The Skyliners	76	October 7, 2017	McKeesport, Pennsylvania, U.S.	Natural causes/Died in his sleep
Grady Tate	85	October 8, 2017	Manhattan, New York, U.S.	Complications from Alzheimer's disease
Francisco Ernesto Ruíz; Banda Cuisillos	32	October 12, 2017	Guadalajara, Jalisco, Mexico	Gunshot
Iain Shedden; The Saints	60	October 16, 2017	Sydney, Australia	Laryngeal cancer
Gord Downie; The Tragically Hip	53	October 17, 2017	Kingston, Ontario, Canada	Glioblastoma
Howard Carroll; Guitarist for The Dixie Hummingbirds	92	October 17, 2017	Philadelphia, Pennsylvania, U.S.	Unknown
Martin Eric Ain; Celtic Frost, Hellhammer	50	October 21, 2017	Zürich, Switzerland	Heart attack
Scott Putesky; Marilyn Manson	49	October 22, 2017	Boca Raton, Florida, U.S.	Colon cancer
Al Hurricane	81	October 22, 2017	Albuquerque, New Mexico, Mexico	Prostate cancer
George Young; The Easybeats, Flash and the Pan	70	October 22, 2017	Singapore	
Fats Domino	89	October 24, 2017	Harvey, Louisiana, U.S.	Natural causes
Dick Noel	90	October 27, 2017	Escondido, California, U.S.	
Billy Mize	88	October 28, 2017	Pleasanton, California, U.S.	
Muhal Richard Abrams	87	October 29, 2017	Manhattan, U.S.	
Katie Lee	98	November 1, 2017	Jerome, Arizona, U.S.	
Robert Knight	72	November 5, 2017	Tennessee, U.S.	
Alberto Baldan Bembo Italian multi-instrumentalist, arranger and composer, brother of Dario Baldan Bembo	79	November 5, 2017	Milan, Italy	Long illness
Pentti Glan; Alice Cooper	71	November 7, 2017	Innisfil, Ontario, Canada	Lung cancer
Chuck Mosley; Faith No More, Bad Brains	57	November 9, 2017	Cleveland, Ohio, U.S.	Drug overdose
Ray Lovelock Italian actor and singer	67	November 10, 2017	Trevi, Italy	
Chad Hanks; Co-Founder and Bassist for American Head Charge	46	November 12, 2017	Minneapolis, Minnesota, United States	Terminal illness/Cancer
Luis Bacalov Italian-Argentine pianist and composer	84	November 15, 2017	Rome, Italy	Ischemia
Bonnie Flower; Wendy and Bonnie	63	November 15, 2017	Cottonwood, Arizona, United States	
Lil Peep	21	November 15, 2017	Tucson, Arizona, U.S.	Drug overdose
Ben Riley	84	November 18, 2017	West Islip, New York, U.S.	Lung disease
Malcolm Young; AC/DC	64	November 18, 2017	Sydney, Australia	Dementia
Charles Manson	83	November 19, 2017	Bakersfield, California, U.S.	Colon cancer Manson died while serving time in California State Prison, Corcoran
Mel Tillis	85	November 19, 2017	Ocala, Florida, U.S.	Respiratory failure
Warren "Pete" Moore; The Miracles	79	November 19, 2017	Las Vegas, Nevada, U.S.	Complications from diabetes
Della Reese	86	November 19, 2017	Los Angeles, California, U.S.	
David Cassidy; The Partridge Family	67	November 21, 2017	Fort Lauderdale, Florida, U.S.	Liver failure
Wayne Cochran	78	November 21, 2017	Miami, Florida, U.S.	Cancer
George Avakian; Record producer from Decca Records, Columbia Records, World Pacific Records, Warner Bros. Records, and RCA Records	98	November 22, 2017	Upper West Side, New York City, New York, U.S.	
Tommy Keene	59	November 22, 2017	Los Angeles, California, United States	Cardiac arrest
Mitch Margo; The Tokens	70	November 24, 2017	Studio City, California, U.S.	Natural causes
Enrico Boccadoro Italian singer-songwriter	42	November 25, 2017	Rome, Italy	
Robert Popwell; The Young Rascals, The Crusaders	66	November 27, 2017	Lebanon, Tennessee, U.S.	
Robert Walker	80	November 29, 2017	Brentwood, Los Angeles, California, U.S.	Cancer
Zé Pedro; Xutos & Pontapés	61	November 30, 2017	Lisbon, Portugal	
Norihiko Hashida	72	December 2, 2017	Kyoto, Japan	Parkinson's disease
Johnny Hallyday	74	December 6, 2017	Marnes-la-Coquette, France	Lung cancer
Sir Christus; Negative	39	December 7, 2017	Tampere, Finland	
Sunny Murray	81	December 8, 2017	Paris, France	Multiple organ failure
Leon Rhodes; Ernest Tubb and His Texas Troubadours	85	December 9, 2017	Nashville, Tennessee, United States	
Lando Fiorini Italian actor and singer	79	December 9, 2017	Rome, Italy	
Keith Chegwin; Brown Sauce	60	December 11, 2017	Shropshire, UK	Idiopathic pulmonary fibrosis
Manno Charlemagne	69	December 10, 2017	Miami Beach, Florida, U.S.	Cancer
Pat DiNizio; The Smithereens	62	December 12, 2017	Summit, New Jersey, U.S.	
Dave Christenson; Stabilizers	54	December 15, 2017	Seattle, Washington, United States	Lung cancer
Warrel Dane; Sanctuary, Nevermore	56	December 13, 2017	São Paulo, Brazil, U.S.	Heart attack
Michael Prophet	60	December 16, 2017	Bedford, England, U.K.	Lung cancer
Richard Dobson	75	December 16, 2017	Diessenhofen, Switzerland	Cancer
Kevin Mahogany	59	December 17, 2017	Kansas City, Missouri, U.S.	Diabetes
Larry Harris; Record producer from Casablanca Records	70	December 20, 2017	Port Angeles, Washington, U.S.	
Kim Jong-hyun; Shinee	27	December 18, 2017	Gangnam District, Seoul, South Korea	Suicide by carbon monoxide poisoning
Combat Jack; American music journalist, editor and podcaster	48	December 20, 2017	Brooklyn, New York, U.S.	Colon cancer
Jordan Feldstein; Manager for Maroon 5	40	December 23, 2017	Beverly Hills, California, United States	Pulmonary thromboembolism

== See also ==
- 27 Club
- List of murdered hip hop musicians
