= Blues on the Bayou =

Studio album by B.B. King
- Released: October 20, 1998
- Recorded: 1998 at Dockside Studio, Maurice, Louisiana
- Genre: Blues, R&B, soul
- Length: 64:13
- Label: MCA
- Producer: B.B. King

B.B. King chronology
Best of King (1997)	Blues on the Bayou (1998)	Live in Japan (1999)

Professional ratings
Review scores
Source	Rating
AllMusic	3/5 stars
Entertainment Weekly	B+
The Penguin Guide to Blues Recordings	2.5/4 stars

Blues on the Bayou is the thirty sixth studio album by B.B. King, released in 1998.

In the CD liner notes, B.B. King writes: "Of the many records Lucille and I have had the pleasure of recording over the years, this one is especially close to my heart. It's also one of the most relaxed and, for me, satisfying [...] No one was telling us what to do. No one needed to tell us what to do." He adds that he considers the band playing on this album as his best ever and that he got to the studio with the idea of keeping the music simple ("I've felt the urge to go back to basics."). With this state of mind, the record was cut in four days: "Found some old B. B. King songs. Wrote some new ones. [...] All live, all real. No overdubs, no high-tech tricks. Just basic blues."

The album won the 2000 Grammy Award for Best Traditional Blues Album.

== Track listing ==
All tracks composed by B.B. King; except where indicated

1. "Blues Boys Tune" - 3:25
2. "Bad Case of Love" - 5:28
3. "I'll Survive" (B.B. King, Sam Ling) - 4:53
4. "Mean Ole' World" - 4:29
5. "Blues Man" - 5:20
6. "Broken Promise" (B.B. King, Sam Ling) - 3:34
7. "Darlin' What Happened" (B.B. King, Sam Ling) - 5:26
8. "Shake It Up and Go" (B.B. King, Jules Taub) - 3:10
9. "Blues We Like" - 5:08
10. "Good Man Gone Bad" (B.B. King, Jules Taub, Ferdinand Washington) - 3:20
11. "If I Lost You" (B.B. King, Jules Taub) - 4:57
12. "Tell Me Baby" (B.B. King, Sam Ling) - 3:26
13. "I Got Some Outside Help I Don't Need" (B.B. King, David Clark) - 4:37
14. "Blues in G" - 3:28
15. "If That Ain't It I Quit" - 3:20

== Charts ==
Chart (1998)	Peak position
German Albums (Offizielle Top 100)	93
UK Albums (OCC)	93
UK Jazz & Blues Albums (OCC)	1
US Blues Albums (Billboard)	2
US Top Album Sales (Billboard)	186

== Personnel ==
- B.B. King - electric guitar, lead vocals
- James Bolden - trumpet, bandleader
- Walter R. King - contractor
- Tony Coleman - percussions
- Calep Emphrey Jr. - drums
- Melvin Jackson - saxophones
- Leon Warren - electric rhythm guitar
- Michael Doster - bass guitar
- James Sells Toney - piano, Hammond B-3 organ
- Stanley Abernathy - trumpet
- Phil Marshall - orchestrations
- Tony Daigle - engineer
- Jim Watts - assistant engineer
- John Porter, Joe McGrath - mixing engineers
- Stephen Marcussen - mastering engineer
- Gary Ashley - A&R
- Sidney A. Seidenberg - executive producer

Recorded at Dockside Studio, Maurice, Louisiana; Mixed at Sound Castle, Los Angeles, California; Mastered at Precision Lacquer, Hollywood, California
