= 2018 Indonesian tsunami =

2018 Indonesian tsunami may refer to:

- 2018 Sulawesi earthquake and tsunami
- 2018 Sunda Strait tsunami
