= List of 2019 deaths in popular music =

This is a list of notable performers of rock music and other forms of popular music, and others directly associated with the music as producers, songwriters, or in other closely related roles, who died in 2019.

== 2019 deaths in popular music ==
Preceded by 2018	List of deaths in popular music 2019	Succeeded by 2020

Name	Age	Date	Location	Cause of death
Kris Kelmi; Autograph	63	January 1, 2019	Novoglagolevo, Naro-Fominsky District, Moscow Oblast, Russia	Heart attack
Feis Dutch-Moroccan Rapper	32	Januari 1, 2019	Rotterdam, Netherlands	Shot to Death
Daryl Dragon; Captain & Tennille, The Beach Boys	76	January 2, 2019	Prescott, Arizona, U.S.	Renal failure
Steve Ripley; The Tractors	69	January 3, 2019	Pawnee, Oklahoma, U.S.	Cancer
Alan R. Pearlman; Synthesizer designer; founder of ARP Instruments	93	January 5, 2019	Newton, Massachusetts, U.S.	Long Illness
Eric Haydock; The Hollies	75	January 5, 2019	England, UK	Heart Attack
Alvin Fielder	83	January 5, 2019	Jackson, Mississippi, U.S.	Congestive heart failure, pneumonia and stroke
Clydie King	75	January 7, 2019	Monrovia, California, U.S.	Blood infection
Teodosio Losito Italian screenwriter, singer, actor and television producer	53	8 January, 2019	Rome, Italy	Suicide
Kevin Fret	25	January 10, 2019	Santurce, San Juan, Puerto Rico	Shot
Bonnie Guitar	95	January 12, 2019	Soap Lake, Washington, U.S.	
Lorna Doom; Germs	60	January 16, 2019	Thousand Oaks, California, U.S.	Breast cancer
Chris Wilson	62	January 16, 2019	Melbourne, Australia	Pancreatic cancer
Reggie Young; The Memphis Boys	82	January 17, 2019	Leiper's Fork, Tennessee, U.S.	Heart failure
Ted McKenna; The Sensational Alex Harvey Band, Rory Gallagher, MSG	68	January 19, 2019	London, UK	Cerebral hemorrhage
Oliver Mtukudzi	66	January 23, 2019	Harare, Zimbabwe	Heart failure related to diabetes
Bruce Corbitt; Rigor Mortis	56	January 25, 2019	Dallas-Fort Worth, Texas, United States	Esophageal cancer
Jacqueline Steiner	94	January 25, 2019	Norwalk, Connecticut, U.S.	Pneumonia
Gaudio Catellani Italian writer, singer and composer	66	January 27, 2019	Cremona, Italy	
Pepe Smith; Juan de la Cruz Band, Speed, Glue & Shinki, Asin	71	January 28, 2019	Cainta, Philippines	Cardiac arrest
Paul Whaley; Blue Cheer, The Oxford Circle	72	January 28, 2019	Regensburg, Germany	Heart failure
James Ingram	66	January 29, 2019	Los Angeles, California, U.S.	Brain Cancer
Gloria Jones; Jerry Garcia Band	74	February 1, 2019	Hayward, California, U.S.	Complications from renal failure
Bill Sims	69	February 2, 2019	U.S.	
Giampiero Artegiani Italian singer-songwriter , lyricist and record producer	63	February 4, 2019	Rome, Italy	Long illness
Guy Webster; Celebrity photographer for The Beach Boys, The Doors, The Rolling Stones	79	February 9, 2019	Ojai, California, U.S.	Complications from diabetes and liver cancer
Harvey Scales	76	February 11, 2019	Milwaukee, Wisconsin, U.S.	Kidney failure and pneumonia
Deise Cipriano; Fat Family	39	February 12, 2019	São Paulo, Brazil	Liver cancer
Olli Lindholm; Appendix, Yö	54	February 12, 2019	Tampere, Finland	Complications from aortic rupture
Kofi Burbridge; Tedeschi Trucks Band	57	February 15, 2019	Atlanta, Georgia, U.S.	Cardiovascular disease
Ken Nordine; Radio host and vocal artist	98	February 16, 2019	Chicago, Illinois, U.S.	
Ethel Ennis	86	February 17, 2019	Baltimore, Maryland, U.S.	Stroke
Fred Foster; Record producer	87	February 20, 2019	Nashville, Tennessee, U.S.	Short illness
Gerard Koerts; Earth and Fire	71	February 21, 2019	Perpignan, France	Lung problems
Gus Backus; The Del-Vikings	81	February 21, 2019	Germering, Germany	Long illness
Jackie Shane	78	February 21, 2019	Nashville, Tennessee, U.S.	Unknown
Peter Tork; The Monkees	77	February 21, 2019	Mansfield, Connecticut, U.S.	Cancer
Mark Hollis; Talk Talk	64	February 25, 2019	Heathfield, UK	Cancer
Andy Anderson; The Cure	68	February 26, 2019	Chelmsford, UK	Cancer
Paul Williams; Juicy Lucy	78	March 1, 2019	California, U.S.	Illness
Al Hazan; B. Bumble and the Stingers	84	March 2, 2019	Los Angeles, California	Brain tumor
Kate Cook; Australian Idol finalist	36	March 3, 2019	Lowood, Queensland, Australia	Unknown; her body found near her home with foul play ruled out.
Keith Flint; The Prodigy	49	March 4, 2019	Great Dunmow, Essex, England	Suicide
Charlie Karp	65	March 10, 2019	U.S.	Liver cancer
Hal Blaine; The Wrecking Crew	90	March 11, 2019	Palm Desert, California, U.S.	Natural causes
Danny Kustow; Tom Robinson Band	63	March 11, 2019	Bath, England	Pneumonia and liver infection
John Kilzer	62	March 12, 2019	Naples, Florida, United States	Suicide by hanging
Dick Dale	81	March 16, 2019	Loma Linda, California, U.S.	Heart failure
Yulia Nachalova Russian singer and actress	38	March 16, 2019	Moscow, Russia	Cardiac arrest and a severe infection/blood poisoning resulting from complications after an operation
Bernie Tormé; Gillan, GMT, Desperado	66	March 17, 2019	London, England	Pneumonia / Post-flu complications
David White; Danny & the Juniors, The Spokesmen	79	March 17, 2019	Las Vegas, Nevada, U.S.	Lung and throat cancer
Andre Williams	82	March 17, 2019	Chicago, Illinois, U.S.	Colon cancer
Doris Duke	77	March 21, 2019	Newark, New Jersey, United States	Undisclosed
Scott Walker; The Walker Brothers	76	March 22, 2019	London, England	Cancer
Ranking Roger; The Beat, General Public	56	March 26, 2019	Birmingham, England	Lung cancer and brain tumor
Stephen Fitzpatrick; Her's	25	March 27, 2019	Centennial, Arizona, United States	Road traffic collision
Audun Laading; Her's	25	March 27, 2019	Centennial, Arizona, United States	Road traffic collision
Simaro Lutumba	81	March 30, 2019	Paris, France	Unspecified illness
Nipsey Hussle	33	March 31, 2019	Los Angeles, California, U.S.	Shot
Shawn Smith; Brad, Satchel, Pigeonhed	53	April 3, 2019	Seattle, Washington, U.S.	Torn aorta and high blood pressure
Alberto Cortez	79	April 4, 2019	Móstoles, Madrid, Spain	Gastric hemorrhage
Wowaka; Hitorie	31	April 5, 2019	Japan	Heart failure
Giuliana Valci Italian singer and astrologer	73	April 12, 2019	Rome, Italy	
Paul Raymond; UFO, Michael Schenker Group, Waysted, Savoy Brown, Chicken Shack	73	April 13, 2019	UK	Heart attack
Eddie Tigner	92	April 18, 2019	Lithonia, Georgia, U.S.	
Dave Samuels; Spyro Gyra	70	April 22, 2019	New York City, New York, U.S.	Long illness
Dick Rivers; Les Chats Sauvages	74	April 24, 2019	Neuilly-sur-Seine, France	Cancer
Beth Carvalho	72	April 30, 2019	Rio de Janeiro, Brazil	Staph Infection
Maa Afia Konadu; Radio presenter from Peace FM	67	May 1, 2019	U.S.	Illness
Vincent James; Vocals for Sweet Sensation	68	May 9, 2019	Stirling, New Jersey, U.S.	Unknown
Doris Day	97	May 13, 2019	Carmel Valley Village, California, U.S.	Pneumonia
Mike Wilhelm; Flamin' Groovies, The Charlatans	77	May 14, 2019	San Francisco, California, U.S.	Cancer
Gabriel Diniz	28	May 27, 2019	Estância, Sergipe, Brazil	Plane crash
Willie Ford; The Dramatics	68	May 28, 2019	Detroit, Michigan, U.S.	Undisclosed illness
Leon Redbone	69	May 30, 2019	Bucks County, Pennsylvania, U.S.	Dementia
Roky Erickson; The 13th Floor Elevators	71	May 31, 2019	Austin, Texas, U.S.	Undisclosed
Dr. John	77	June 6, 2019	New Orleans, Louisiana, U.S.	Heart attack
Andre Matos; Viper, Angra, Shaman, Symfonia	47	June 8, 2019	São Paulo, Brazil	Heart attack
Manfred Temmel; Joy	60	June 8, 2019	Vienna, Austria	Undisclosed
Bushwick Bill; Geto Boys	52	June 10, 2019	Denver, Colorado, U.S.	Pancreatic cancer
Paul "Lil' Buck" Sinegal	75	June 10, 2019	Lafayette, Louisiana, U.S.	Health complications
Enrico Nascimbeni Italian singer-songwriter and journalist	59	June 11, 2019	Milan, Italy	
Bishop Bullwinkle	70	June 16, 2019	Plant City, Florida, U.S.	Heart attack
Elliot Roberts; Music executive from Asylum Records and manager	76	June 21, 2019	Los Angeles, California, U.S.	Undisclosed
Dave Bartholomew	100	June 23, 2019	New Orleans, Louisiana, U.S.	Heart failure
Gary Duncan; Quicksilver Messenger Service	72	June 29, 2019	Woodland, California, U.S.	Complications from a seizure
Ibrahim Emin; Yukhu	56	July 2, 2019	Sumgait, Azerbaijan	Esophageal cancer
João Gilberto	88	July 6, 2019	Rio de Janeiro, Brazil	Undisclosed
Jerry Lawson; The Persuasions	75	July 10, 2019	Phoenix, Arizona, U.S.	Guillain-Barré Syndrome
Johnny Clegg; Juluka, Savuka	66	July 16, 2019	Johannesburg, South Africa	Pancreatic cancer
Pat Kelly; The Techniques	74	July 16, 2019	Kingston, Jamaica	Kidney disease
Palma Calderoni Italian singer	73	July 17, 2019	Lugo, Italy	
Ras G Record producer for Brainfeeder	39	July 29, 2019	Los Angeles, California, U.S.	Undisclosed
Ian Gibbons; The Kinks	67	August 1, 2019	Portola Valley, California, United States	Bladder cancer
Roberto Merlone "Roby" Italian guitarist, composer and singer	61	August 2, 2019	Savona, Italy	
Katreese Barnes; Juicy	56	August 3, 2019	Manhattan, New York City, U.S.	Breast cancer
Henri Belolo; Music producer from The Ritchie Family, Village People	82	August 3, 2019	Paris, France	Pancreatic cancer
Joe Longthorne	64	August 3, 2019	Blackpool, England	Throat cancer
Damien Lovelock; The Celibate Rifles	65	August 3, 2019	Sydney, New South Wales, Australia	Cancer
Lizzie Grey; London, Mötley Crüe, Sister	60	August 5, 2019	Las Vegas, Nevada, U.S.	Lewy body disease
David Berman; Silver Jews, Purple Mountains	52	August 7, 2019	Brooklyn, New York City, U.S.	Suicide
Francesca Sundsten; The Beakers	58 or 59	August 7, 2019	Seattle, Washington, U.S.	Lymphoma
DJ Arafat	33	August 12, 2019	Abidjan, Ivory Coast	Motorcycle crash
Piero Pischedda Historic lead guitarist and co-founder of the Italian musical group Collage	63	August 14, 2019	Olbia, Italy	
Larry Taylor; Canned Heat	77	August 19, 2019	Lake Balboa, California, U.S.	Cancer
Clora Bryant	92	August 25, 2019	Los Angeles, California U.S.	Heart attack
Neal Casal; Ryan Adams and the Cardinals, Blackfoot, Chris Robinson Brotherhood	50	August 26, 2019	Ventura, California, United States	Suicide
Reb Foster; Radio disc jockey and band manager from Steppenwolf, Three Dog Night, The Turtles	83	August 26, 2019	Amarillo, Texas, United States	Unknown
Joana Sainz García	30	September 1, 2019	Las Berlanas, Spain	Stage explosion caused by pyrotechnics
LaShawn Daniels	41	September 3, 2019	Catawba, South Carolina, U.S.	Car crash
Camilo Sesto	72	September 8, 2019	Madrid, Spain	Kidney failure
Jeff Fenholt; Jesus Christ Superstar, Black Sabbath, Joshua	68	September 10, 2019	Riverside, California, U.S.	Health problems
Daniel Johnston	58	September 11, 2019	Waller, Texas, U.S.	Natural causes
Eddie Money	70	September 13, 2019	San Francisco, California, U.S.	Esophageal cancer
Ric Ocasek; The Cars	75	September 15, 2019	New York City, U.S.	Cardiovascular disease
Tony Mills; TNT, Shy	57	September 18, 2019	Tjørme, Norway	Pancreatic cancer
Francesco Specchia Italian lyricist		September 18, 2019	Milan, Italy	
Larry Wallis; Shagrat, UFO, Pink Fairies, Motörhead	70	September 19, 2019	England, UK	Undisclosed
Yonrico Scott; The Derek Trucks Band	63	September 20, 2019	Greenville, South Carolina, United States	Undisclosed
Robert Hunter; Lyricist for the Grateful Dead	78	September 23, 2019	San Rafael, California, United States	Undisclosed
José José	71	September 28, 2019	Homestead, Florida, U.S.	Pancreatic cancer
Beverly Watkins	80	October 1, 2019	Atlanta, Georgia, U.S.	Heart attack
Kim Shattuck; Muffs, The Pandoras, The Pixies	56	October 2, 2019	Los Angeles, California, U.S.	ALS
Vinnie Bell; Inventor of the electric sitar	87	October 3, 2019	Tenafly, New Jersey, U.S.	Alzheimer's disease
Ed Ackerson; Polara	54	October 4, 2019	Minneapolis, Minnesota, U.S.	Pancreatic cancer
Larry Junstrom; Lynyrd Skynyrd, 38 Special	70	October 6, 2019	Palatka, Florida, U.S.	Brain tumor
Ginger Baker; Cream, Blind Faith, Hawkwind, BBM, Baker Gurvitz Army, The Graham Bond Organisation	80	October 6, 2019	Canterbury, England	Heart problems
Joachim “Achim” Bauer Schrott nach 8		October 8, 2019		
Molly Duncan; Average White Band	74	October 12, 2019	Bocholt, Germany	Terminal cancer
Manuel Frattini Italian dancer, singer and actor	54	October 12, 2019	Milan, Italy	Heart attack
Steve Cash; The Ozark Mountain Daredevils	73	October 14, 2019	Springfield, Missouri, U.S.	Long illness
Plinio Maggi Italian singer, composer and lyricist	78	October 20, 2019	Catania, Italy	
Ed Cherney; Recording engineer and record producer	69	October 22, 2019	Los Angeles, California, U.S.	Cancer
Paul Barrere; Little Feat	71	October 26, 2019	Los Angeles, California, U.S.	Liver cancer
Marie Laforêt	80	November 2, 2019	Genolier, Switzerland	Unknown
Timi Hansen; Mercyful Fate, King Diamond	61	November 4, 2019	Copenhagen, Denmark	Cancer
Fred Bongusto Italian singer-songwriter	84	November 8, 2019	Rome, Italy	Long-term respiratory illness
Vittorio Inzaina Italian singer	77	November 16, 2019	Telti, Sassari, Italy	
John Mann; Spirit of the West	57	November 20, 2019	Vancouver, British Columbia	Alzheimer's Disease
Martin Armiger; The Sports	70	November 27, 2019	Pompadour, France	Long illness
Greedy Smith; Mental As Anything	63	December 2, 2019	Sydney, New South Wales, Australia	Heart attack
Antonio Dimitri Italian actor and singer	88	December 8, 2019	Rome, Italy	
Juice Wrld	21	December 8, 2019	Oak Lawn, Illinois, U.S.	Accidental overdose of oxycodone and codeine
Marie Fredriksson; Roxette	61	December 9, 2019	Djursholm, Sweden	Brain cancer
Jack Scott	83	December 12, 2019	Warren, Michigan, U.S.	Congestive heart failure
Roy Loney; Flamin' Groovies	73	December 13, 2019	San Francisco, California, U.S.	Severe organ failure
Joel Vandroogenbroeck; Brainticket	81	December 23, 2019	Arlesheim, Switzerland	Undisclosed
Les Chadwick; Gerry and the Pacemakers	76	December 26, 2019	Sydney, Australia	Brain cancer
Sleepy LaBeef	84	December 26, 2019	Siloam Springs, Arkansas, U.S.	Undisclosed
Jean-Pierre Massiera	78	December 28, 2019	Cagnes-sur-Mer, France	Unknown
Norma Tanega	80	December 29, 2019	Claremont, California, U.S.	Cancer

== See also ==
- List of murdered hip hop musicians
- 27 Club
