= Live in Japan (B. B. King album) =

Live album by B. B. King
- Released: May 18, 1999
- Recorded: March 4 & 6, 1971
- Genre: Blues, R&B, soul
- Label: MCA

B. B. King chronology
Blues on the Bayou (1998)	Live in Japan (1999)	Let the Good Times Roll (1999)

Professional ratings
Review scores
Source	Rating
The Penguin Guide to Blues Recordings	3/4 stars

Live in Japan is a live album by B. B. King recorded in Sankei Hall, Tokyo on March 4 and 6, 1971, and released 1971 only in Japan as double LP. It was reissued 1999 for the first time outside Japan.

== Track listing ==
1. "Every Day I Have the Blues" - 2:10
2. "How Blue Can You Get?" - 5:17
3. "Eyesight to the Blind" - 4:03
4. "Niji Baby" - 6:27
5. "You're Still My Woman" - 5:56
6. "Chains and Things" - 5:41
7. "Sweet Sixteen" - 6:00
8. "Hummingbird" - 4:08
9. "Darlin' You Know I Love You" - 4:26
10. "Japanese Boogie" - 9:17
11. "Jamming at Sankei Hall" - 9:35
12. "The Thrill Is Gone" - 5:36
13. "Hikari #88" - 7:57

== Personnel ==
- B.B. King - guitar, vocals
- Wilbert Freeman - bass
- Ron Levy - piano
- Sonny Freeman - drums
- Earl Turbington, Louis Hubert - saxophone
- Joe Burton - trombone
- John Browning - trumpet
