= Dylan Sahara =

Indonesian actress (1992–2018)

- Born: 23 December 1992; Ponorogo, East Java, Indonesia
- Died: 22 December 2018 (aged 25); Tanjung Lesung, Pandeglang, Banten, Indonesia
- Cause of death: Sunda Strait tsunami
- Occupations: Actress, presenter
- Spouse: Riefian Fajarsyah (m. 2016)

Dylan Sahara (23 December 1992 – 22 December 2018) was an Indonesian television actress and presenter. In 2016, she married Indonesian vocalist Riefian Fajarsyah who was a member of the Seventeen pop band. She died on 22 December 2018 during the Sunda Strait tsunami, a day short of her 26th birthday, as she attended the stage performed by the band Seventeen in event held by Perusahaan Listrik Negara (PLN) when the tsunami hit. She was survived by Fajarsyah, who was also the sole survivor of the Seventeen group which was washed out by tidal waves.

She was set to run for a seat in the People's Representative Council in the 2019 Indonesian legislative election for the Great Indonesia Movement Party (Gerindra).

== Death ==
The pop band Seventeen was performing at an event held by state electric company PLN at the Tanjung Lesung resort near the shore of Tanjung Lesung beach when an eruption from Anak Krakatau caused a tsunami that struck the stage from behind, at around 9:30 pm local time. Along with drummer Windu Andi Darmawan and guitarist Herman Sikumbang, she was recorded as missing after the tsunami. All three were later found dead. Shortly thereafter, her widower, Ifan, the only surviving member, announced his solo career.

== Filmography ==
- 2 Dewi (2011)
- Baper (2016–17)
