= King (2009 film) =

- Theatrical release poster
- Directed by: Ari Sihasale
- Written by: Dirmawan Halta
- Produced by: Ari Sihasale
- Starring: Rangga Raditya; Lucky Martin; Surya Saputra; Mamiek Prakoso; Valerie Thomas; Jonatan Christie; Kevin Sanjaya
- Distributed by: Alenia Pictures
- Release date: 25 June 2009 (Indonesia)
- Running time: 75 minutes
- Country: Indonesia
- Language: Indonesian

King is an Indonesian movie released in 2009, that tells about the dream of a village boy named Guntur (Rangga Raditya) to become an international badminton player. The film starred Rangga Raditya, Lucky Martin, Surya Saputra, Mamiek Prakoso, Valerie Thomas, Heryanto Arbi, Jonatan Christie, and Kevin Sanjaya. The film is the first film about badminton in the world.

== Synopsis ==
The film tells about the dream of a village boy named Guntur (Rangga Raditya) to become an international badminton player. His father Tedjo (Mamiek Prakoso), who is a swan feather collector, ingredients to make shuttlecock, is a huge fan of Liem Swie King, an Indonesian badminton legend told his son the greatness of King. After his father told him about the story, Guntur determined to become a top international badminton player by joining a local badminton club, where he met his rival Arya Jonatan Christie. Until one day, when he and his rival, Arya invited to a selection process to join the biggest badminton club in Indonesia PB Djarum. During the selection, Arya failed it and has to go back home, when Guntur was selected to join the club. Two years later he won the Asian U-16 Badminton Championship.

== Cast ==
- Rangga Raditya as Guntur
- Lucky Martin as Raden
- Surya Saputra as Mr. Herman
- Mamiek Prakoso as Tedjo, Guntur's father
- Valerie Thomas as Michelle
- Jonatan Christie as Arya
- Kevin Sanjaya as himself
- Aa Jimmy
