= Seventeen (Indonesian band) =

Indonesian pop rock band

- Origin: Yogyakarta, Indonesia
- Genres: Pop rock; alternative rock; slow rock; soft rock
- Years active: 1999–2018
- Labels: Universal; EMI; Mi2; GP
- Past members: Windu Andi Darmawan; M. Awal "Bani" Purbani; Herman Sikumbang; Riefian "Ifan" Fajarsyah; Yudhi Rus Harjanto; Yohan "Doni" Saputro; Zulianto Zulkifli "Zozo" Angga

Seventeen was an Indonesian pop rock band that was formed in 1999 in Yogyakarta by schoolmates Yudhi Rus Harjanto, Herman Sikumbang, Zulianto "Zozo" Angga, and Windu Andi Darmawan, all of whom were 17 when the group was formed. Vocalists Yohan "Doni" Saputro and Riefian "Ifan" Fajarsyah, and bassist M. Awal "Bani" Purbani joined the band at a later date.

The group was performing in a tent at the Tanjung Lesung resort on 22 December 2018 when the 2018 Sunda Strait tsunami, the result of an eruption from Anak Krakatau, struck the stage from behind, killing almost all members of the band. Fajarsyah was the sole survivor from the band, which was then dissolved. As of 2024, Fajarsyah, Harjanto, Saputro and Angga are the last surviving members of the band.

== History ==
The band was formed by Harjanto, Sikumbang, Angga, and Darmawan, students who attended a private high school in Yogyakarta. With a serious desire to form a band, they asked M. Awal "Bani" Purbani, Yudhi's cousin, to join the band. Seventeen was officially formed on January 17, 1999. The band's name, "Seventeen", was chosen because all of the band members were 17 years old. One year later, Saputro joined the band to fill the vocalist position.

Their debut album, Bintang Terpilih ("Selected Stars") was released on July 17, 2003, through Universal Music Indonesia. They asked the Indonesian MTV VJ at the time, Arie Untung, to do a duet on their song "Jibaku". This album achieved sales of up to 75,000 copies. Some of its songs were used for soap opera soundtracks. Shortly after the album's release, their label closed its local division. For the next two years, the band did not have a contract with a label. When the Universal Music local division was reopened, Seventeen immediately signed a contract. They released their second album, Sweet Seventeen, in 2005, which featured the single "Jika Kau Percaya" ("If You Believe").

In 2008, vocalist Saputro, drummer Darmawan, and guitarist Angga left the band. The remaining band members were anxious to find a replacement for the crucial vocalist position. After going through the audition process, they hired Riefian "Ifan" Fajarsyah as their new vocalist. The difference in vocal characteristics between Saputro and Fajarsyah ushered in a change in Seventeen's genre, moving their style from rock to a more pop sound. Seventeen's third album, Lelaki Hebat ("Great Man"), was released in 2008; illustrating thea drastic change from rock to pop. Seventeen released their third album, in the Glodok electronic goods shopping center, that has been known as a place for music pirates. After the release of their third album, Darmawan rejoined as a drummer. In 2011, the band released their fourth album, Dunia yang Indah ("The Beautiful World"), introducing the hit single "Jaga Slalu Hatimu" ("Always Keep Your Heart").

In 2013, due to differences in music vision, replacement guitarist Yudhi Rus Harjanto left the band just as the fifth album Sang Juara ("The Champion") was to be released. The album contains two singles, titled "Sang Juara" and "Sumpah Ku Mencintaimu" ("I Swear I Love You").

Three years later, on 31 March 2016, Seventeen released their sixth album Pantang Mundur ("Persistent"). In this album, they worked with music directors for the first time. The album contains 11 tracks, including five singles: "Cinta Jangan Sembunyi" ("Love Don't Hide"), "Bukan Main Main" ("Not Kidding"), "Aku Gila" ("I'm Crazy"), "Menunggu Kamu" ("Waiting for You") and "Kemarin" ("Yesterday").

In 2018, they released a single entitled "Jangan Dulu Pergi" ("Don't Go Away"), written for the vocalist Fajarsyah's deceased father. Its music video was released on 10 June 2018. It was the last song by the band before it disbanded.

== Sunda Strait tsunami ==
Seventeen was performing at the PLN Family Gathering in Tanjung Lesung, Pandeglang, Banten, when an eruption from Anak Krakatau caused a tsunami that abruptly struck the stage from behind. All the members were swept away by the tsunami, which hit at 9:30PM local time. Replacement bassist M. Awal "Bani" Purbani and road manager Oki Wijaya were declared dead at the scene. The body of guitarist Sikumbang (born 17 March 1982 in Tidore, North Maluku), was found several hours later. The body of drummer Darmawan was found the following day. Crew member Rukmana "Ujang" Rustam and vocalist Fajarsyah's wife, actress and TV personality Dylan Sahara, were also killed in the tsunami.

Fajarsyah survived the disaster as the only remaining member of Seventeen. He continued performing as a solo artist.

Despite being disbanded, the band's name is still carried by Fajarsyah in his solo career. On 13 November 2022, he announced that although the band no longer exists, he will continue to use the band name in honor of the deceased members, naming them as eternal members who retain the posts they had while alive. Fajarsyah made the move to preserve the Seventeen name in the Indonesian music industry, announcing that he will not form a new band or join any other band, in honor of his former band members. Since 12 March 2025, Fajarsyah appointed by President Prabowo Subianto as General Director of the State Film Productions, state-owned film financing company.

== Documentary film ==
In 2019, Mahakarya Pictures announced with Mahaka Radio Integra that they were working on a documentary film of Seventeen. The project was announced in October 2019 as Kemarin ("Yesterday"). The film was released on December 3, 2020, after facing several delays, including the COVID-19 pandemic.

== Band members ==
Final lineup

- Windu Andi Darmawan – drums (1999–2018; his death)
- M. Awal "Bani" Purbani – bass guitar (1999–2018; his death)
- Herman Sikumbang – guitar (1999–2018; his death)
- Riefian "Ifan" Fajarsyah – vocals (2008–2018)

Former members

- Zulianto Zulkifli "Zozo" Angga – guitar (1999–2008)
- Yudhi Rus Harjanto – guitar (1999–2012)
- Yohan "Doni" Saputro – vocals, guitar (2000–2007)

Timeline

== Discography ==
=== Studio albums ===
- Bintang Terpilih (2003)
- Sweet Seventeen (2005)
- Lelaki Hebat (2008)
- Dunia Yang Indah (2011)
- Sang Juara (2013)
- Pantang Mundur (2016)

=== Singles ===
- "Jibaku" (featuring Arie Untung) (2003)
- "Jika Kau Percaya" (2005)
- "Selalu Mengalah" (2008)
- "Untuk Mencintaimu" (2008)
- "Lelaki Hebat" (2008)
- "Jalan Terbaik" (2008)
- "Jaga Slalu Hatimu" (2011)
- "Hal Terindah" (2011)
- "Sang Juara" (2013)
- "Sumpah Ku Mencintaimu" (2013)
- "Cinta Jangan Sembunyi" (2016)
- "Bukan Main Main" (2016)
- "Aku Gila" (2016)
- "Menunggu Kamu" (2016)
- "Kemarin" (2016)
- "Jangan Dulu Pergi" (2018)
