= Las Berlanas =

- municipality
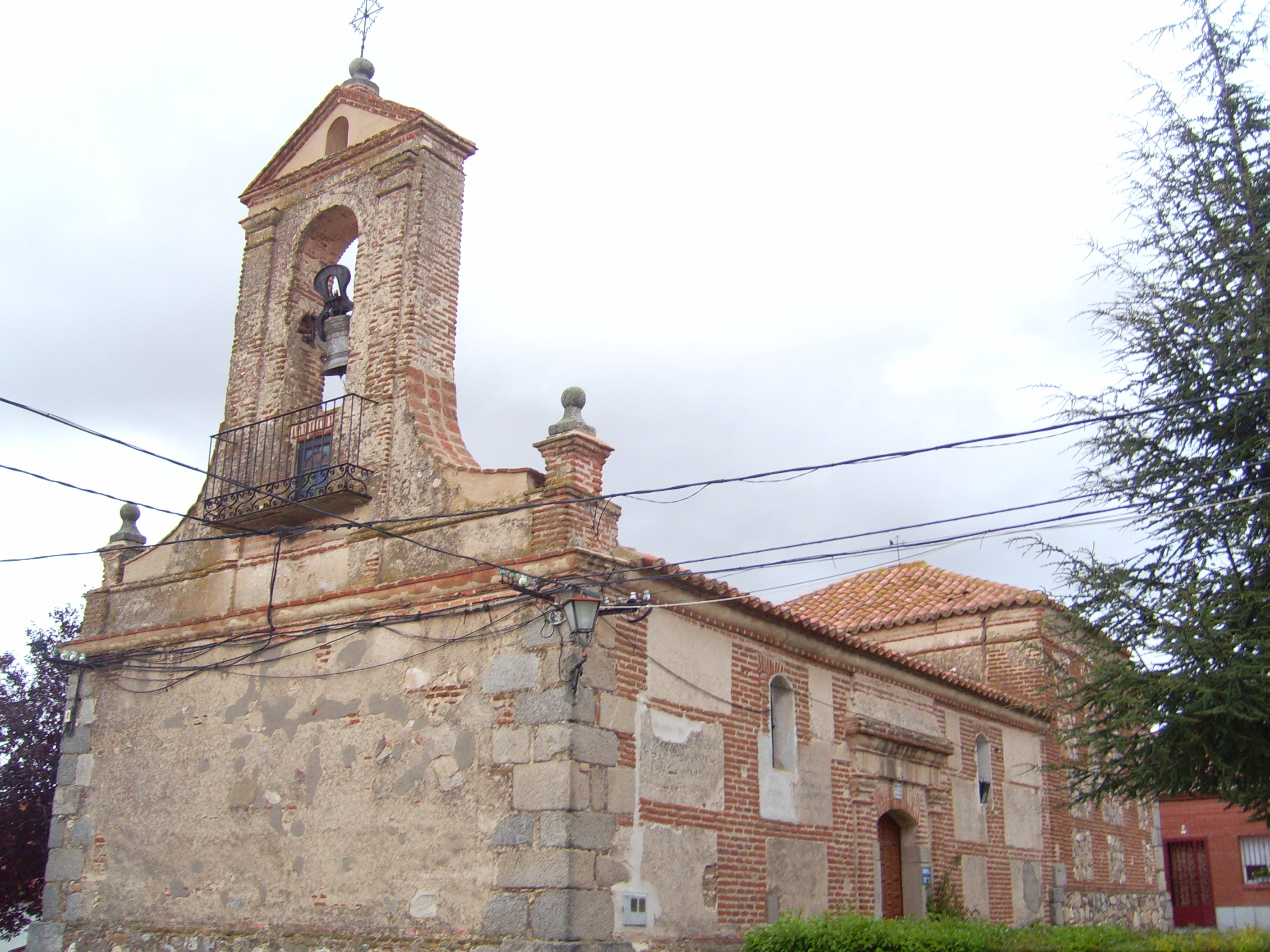
- Church of Our Lady of the Conception in Las Berlanas

- Flag Coat of arms

- Location in Spain. Las Berlanas (Castile and León)
- Coordinates: 40°48′11″N 4°45′38″W
- Country: Spain
- Autonomous community: Castile and León
- Province: Ávila

Area
  - Total: 16 km^{2} (6.2 sq mi)

Population (2025-01-01)
  - Total: 323
  - Density: 20/km^{2} (52/sq mi)
- Time zone: UTC+1 (CET)
  - Summer (DST): UTC+2 (CEST)
- Website: Official website

Las Berlanas is a municipality located in the province of Ávila, Castile and León, Spain.

== Population ==
Historical population
Year	Pop.	±% p.a.
2023	326	—
2024	323	−0.92%
2025	323	+0.00%
Source: INE
