= Tanjung Lesung =

Beach in Java, Indonesia

Tanjung Lesung ᮒᮔ᮪ᮏᮥᮀ ᮜᮨᮞᮥᮀ
- Beach
- Interactive map of Tanjung Lesung ᮒᮔ᮪ᮏᮥᮀ ᮜᮨᮞᮥᮀ
- Coordinates: 6.4786°S 105.6558°E
- Location: Banten, Java Island, Indonesia

Dimensions
  - Length: 15 km (9.3 mi)

Tanjung Lesung (Indonesian: Pantai Tanjung Lesung) is a beach in Pandeglang Regency, Banten, western tip of Java. It is 160 kilometres (99 mi) from the capital city of Indonesia, Jakarta, and can be reached by car or public bus in about a 3-4-hour drive. It is known as a beach resort with sea views, having a 15-kilometre (9.3 mi) white sand coastline and also marine life where visitors can enjoy snorkeling, diving as well as fishing. The area has been declared as a "cultural heritage" since the location is near Ujung Kulon National Park, Mount Krakatau and Umang Island.

Tanjung Lesung was launched by the Indonesian government as a special economic zone (SEZ) in tourism sector in 2012 and was declared ready for operation on 23 February 2015. The government is collaborating with private developer PT Banten West Java TDC (Tourism Development Corporation) and PT Tanjung Lesung Leisure Industry, subsidiaries of PT Jababeka Tbk. Tanjung Lesung SEZ has indeed been targeted by the government to be able to reach one million tourists from home and abroad in 2019 as the completion of some supporting infrastructure. It is also one of the 50 national tourism destinations stipulated by the Ministry of Tourism and also becomes one of 10 priority tourist areas whose development will be accelerated by government.

The beach was heavily damaged by the 2018 Sunda Strait tsunami, with significant casualties including Seventeen band's Bani, drummer Windu Andi Darmawan and guitarist Herman Sikumbang along with actress Dylan Sahara.

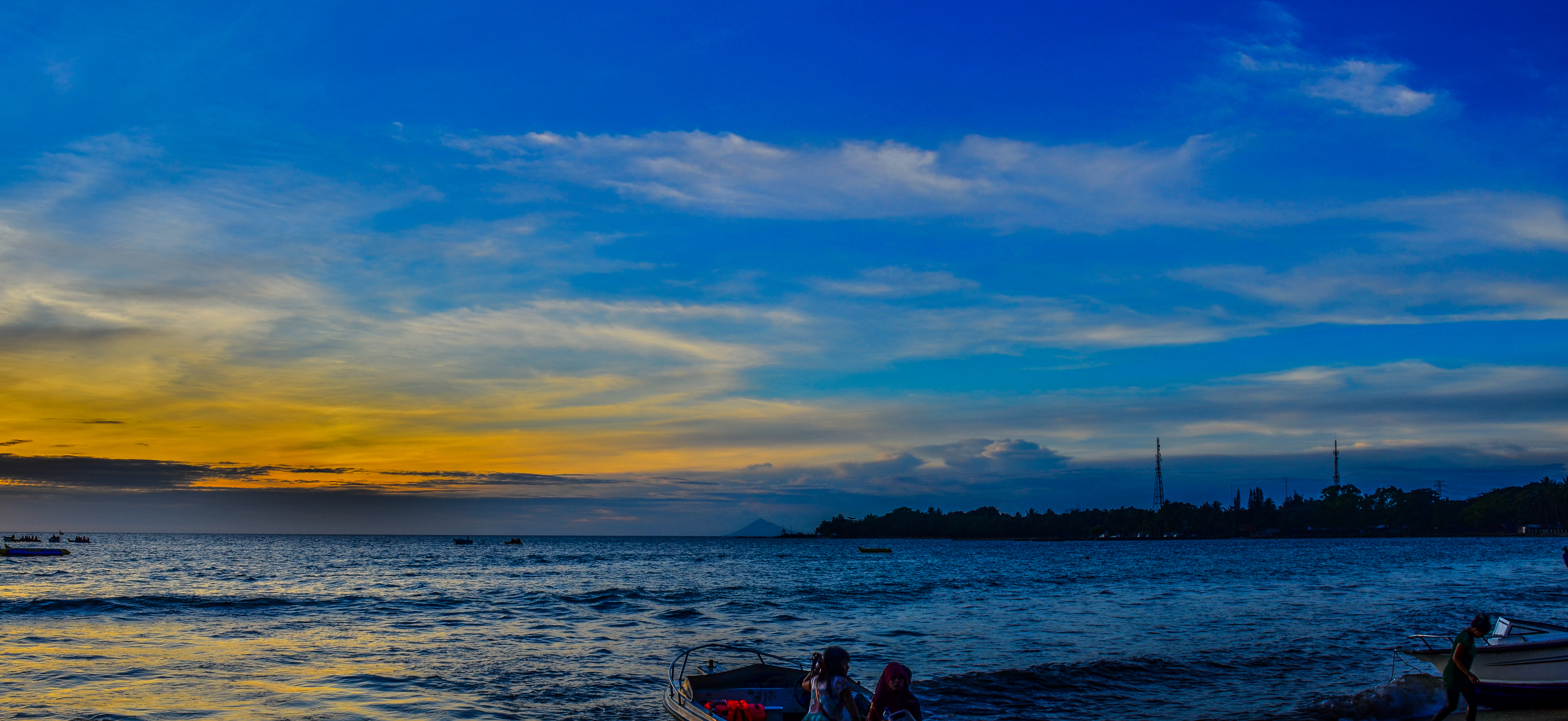
Tanjung Lesung Beach

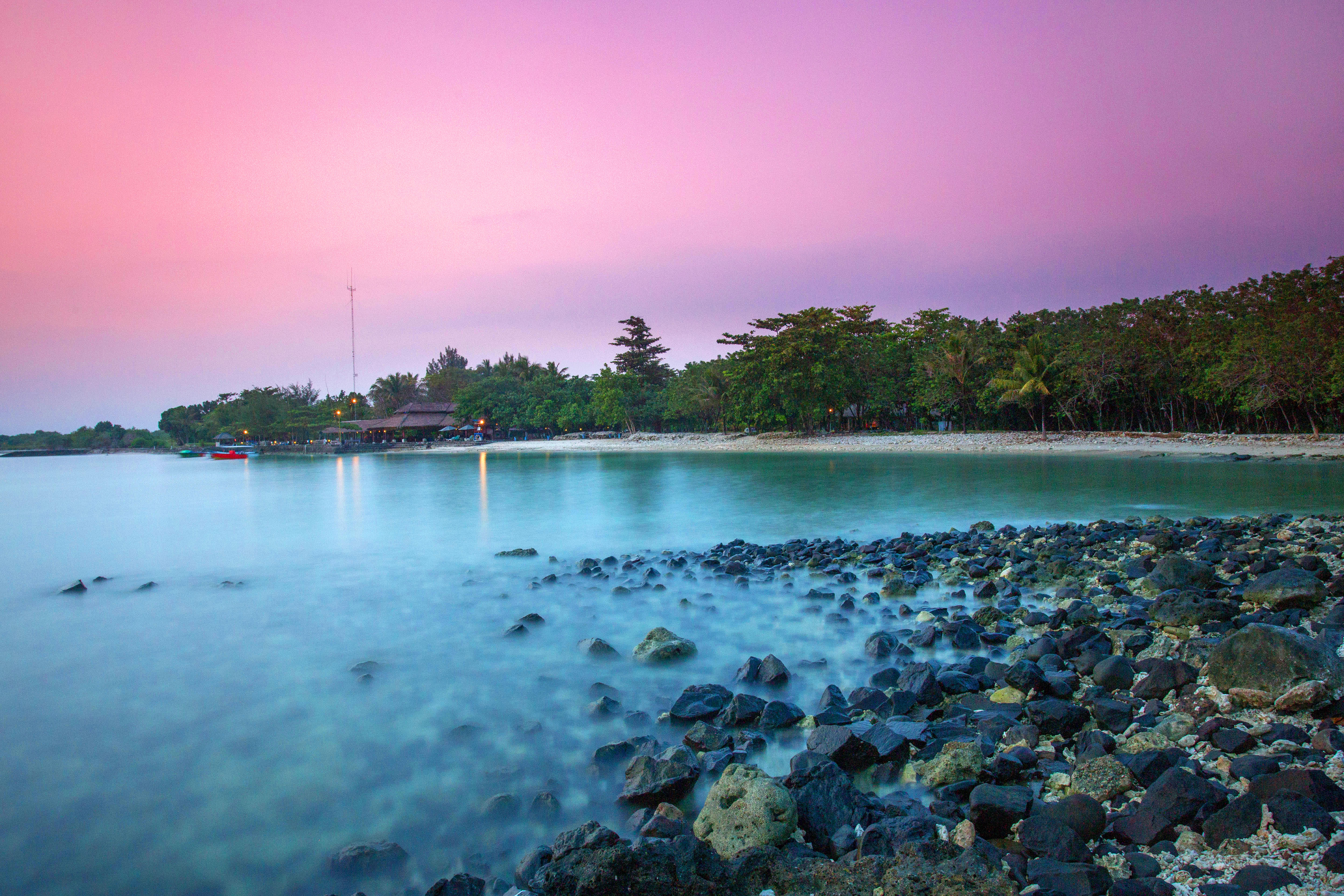
Tanjung Lesung in the Morning

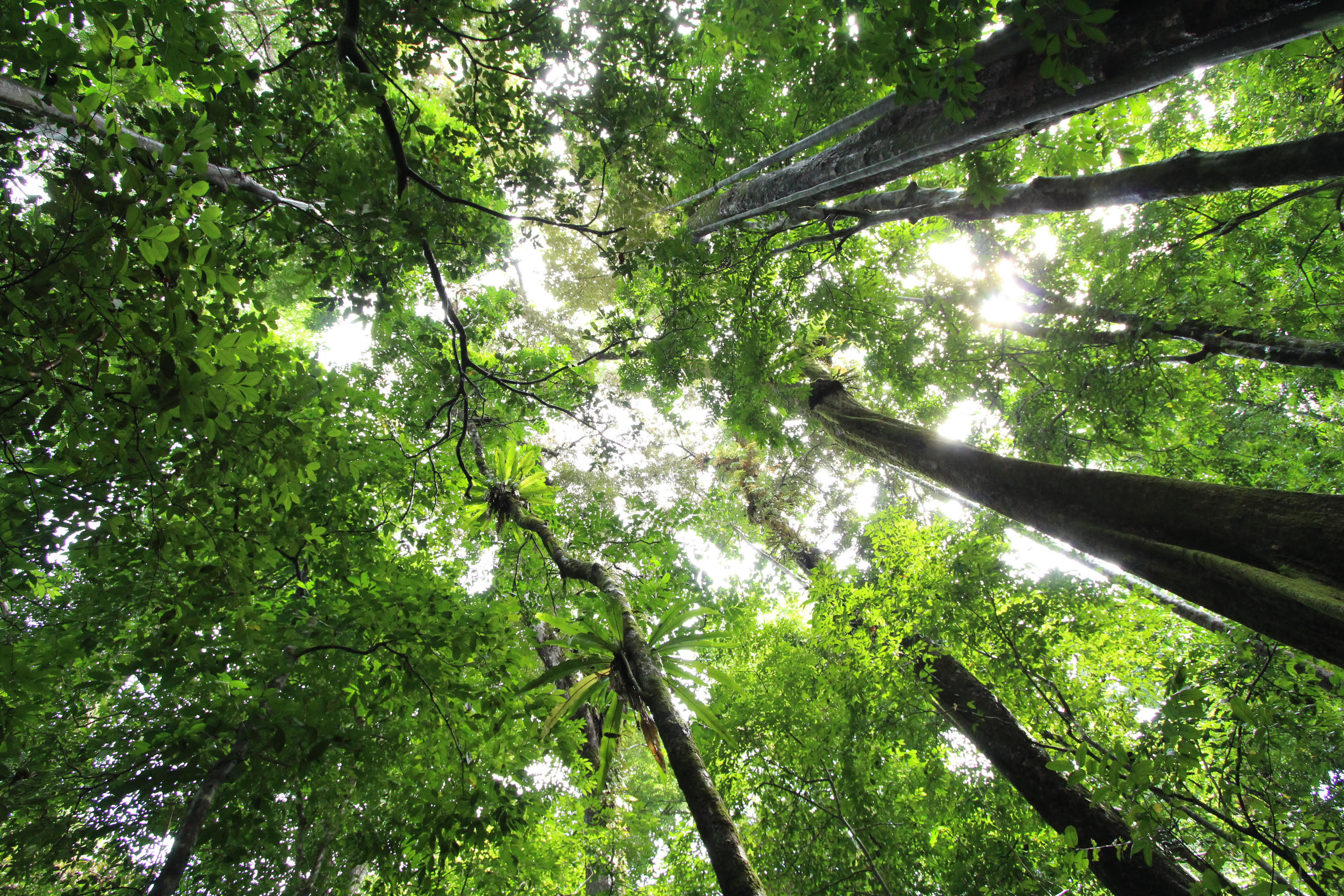
Tanjung Lesung Forest

== Transportation access ==
The government of the Indonesia has intensively developed transportation access for easy access to this place for the reasons of development of the SEZ. Construction of 83.9 km (52.1 mi) toll road Serang – Panimbang will be connected to the existing Jakarta – Merak toll road, targeted to be finished by 2018. This integration is targeted to accelerate travel time so that it will only take 2.5 hours from Jakarta. PT Wijaya Karya Serang Panimbang, a state-owned company and as Toll Road Enterprises (Badan Pengelola Jalan Tol/BPJT), plans to start the toll road construction process in the second quarter of 2017. Based on data of BPJT, this toll road is divided into 3 sections. Section I, Serang – Rangkas Bitung 26.5 km (16.5 mi) (operated since November 17, 2021 after inauguration by Indonesian President, Joko Widodo on November 16, 2021), section II, Rangkas Bitung – Cileles 24.5 km (15.2 mi) (construction began on late March 2021 and still in progress), and section III, Cileles – Panimbang 33 km (21 mi) (construction began on early August 2022 after groundbreaking, and still in progress).

The sole construction of the toll road is mainly targeting local tourists' comfort traveling from Jakarta to Tanjung Lesung. In order to cater for foreign tourists' comforts as well, a construction of an airport is planned in addition to the toll access. Tanjung Lesung is also currently being pursued to have its own tourist port. Facility to support regular stopover for a tour cruise without having to stop at Pandeglang harbour has been planned to be developed in the near future. Another transportation option to be developed is train transport. This line is already there and is now being explored to be revived to ease access to Tanjung Lesung SEZ.

== Accommodation ==
Indonesian government targets one million visits to Tanjung Lesung SEZ. To fulfill this target, they invited PT Jababeka Tbk, along with some local and overseas investors, to provide transportation access and suitable accommodation facility. The accommodations provided are hotels and resorts.

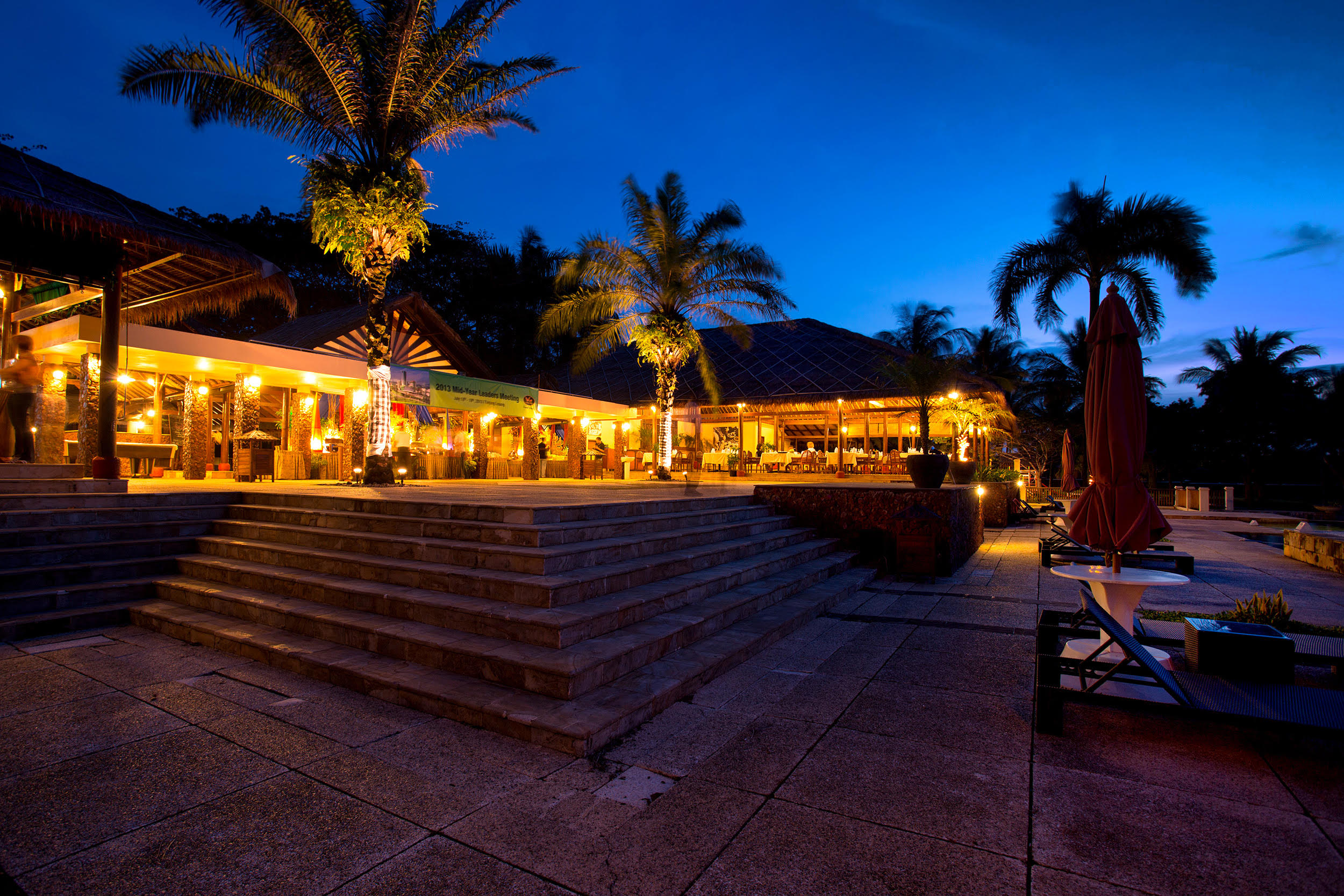
Tanjung Lesung Hotel

== Environment ==
Tanjung Lesung as a tourist destination was previously undeveloped for 20 years. Tourists were not many so that it could not boost the economy of the surrounding people. Occupancy rate of the hotels in Tanjung Lesung had been only 25% in average while to survive the rate should be minimal 35%–40%. Therefore, in line with the construction of toll road for easy access to the location, promotions and tour packages are offered. Another factor which burdens the local economy was the low-level education, especially in tourism, of people surrounding Tanjung Lesung. Thus, education and infrastructure issues become the focus of empowerment to be undertaken by Banten provincial government. Two solutions to these problems are to build a tourism school and develop a supporting tourist village outside Tanjung Lesung. Better education and training also opens up wide opportunity for the locals to fill the positions in and around the facilities of Tanjung Lesung. In order to achieve this, Banten provincial government has cooperated with central government to build tourism school and tourism village development to fully support Tanjung Lesung SEZ.
