= Calep Emphrey Jr. =

American blues drummer and bandleader

Calep H. Emphrey Jr. (May 1, 1949 – April 25, 2017) was an American blues drummer and bandleader, best known as a member of B. B. King's band.

Born in Greenville, Mississippi, he played French horn and saxophone in the school band at Coleman High School, before attending Mississippi Valley State College, where he majored in music. Around 1969, he began playing drums in Little Milton's band, before joining first Freddie King and then Albert King. In 1977, he joined B. B. King's band, remaining a member of King's band until around 2009. He formed his own Calep Emphrey Blues Band, and issued an album, Handcuffed to the Blues, in 2010.

Emphrey died in 2017, aged 67. In 2017 the Killer Blues Headstone Project placed the headstone for Calep Emphry Jr. at Oaklawn Cemetery in Greenville, Mississippi.
