= 2018 Sunda Strait tsunami =

Tsunami in coastal regions of Banten and Lampung, Indonesia

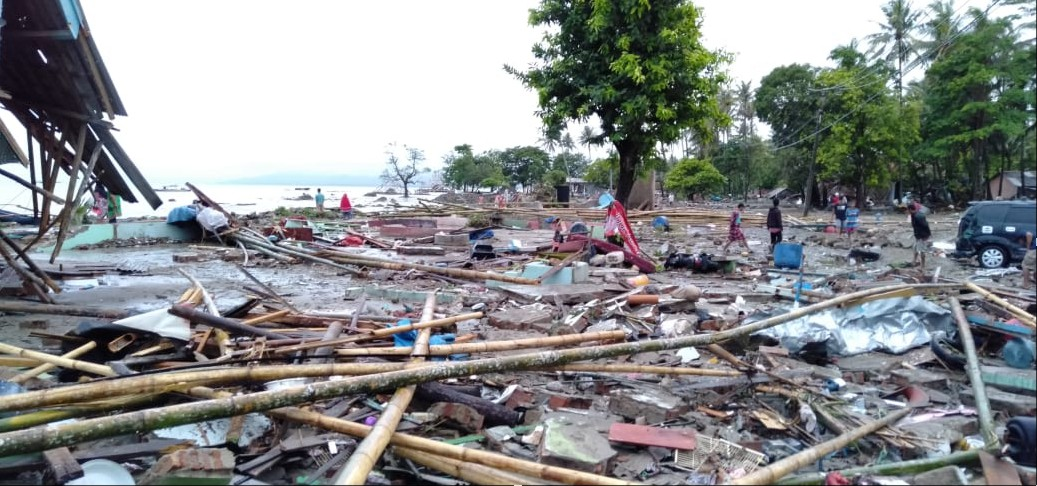
- Damage in Carita Beach, Banten, Java after the tsunami. Photo 23 December 2018.
- Date: 22 December 2018
- Time: around 21:38 WIB (14:38 UTC)
- Location: Sunda Strait, Indonesia; 6.103°S 105.423°E
- Type: Volcanic tsunami
- Deaths: 426
- Injuries: 14,059
- Missing: 25
- Property damage: 2,752 houses and 510 ships

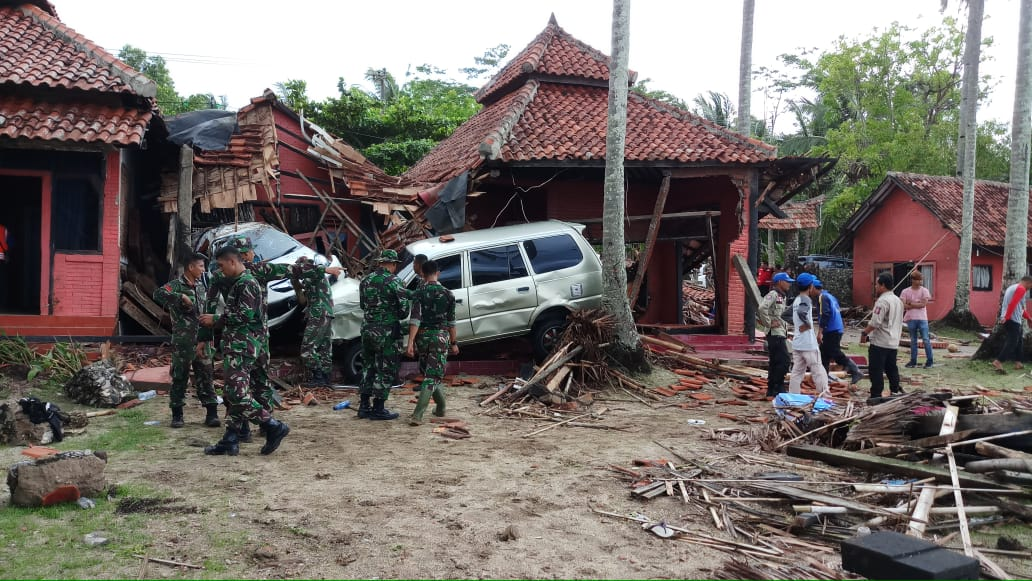
Damage from the Sunda strait tsunami, Banten, 23 December 2018

The 2018 Sunda Strait tsunami (Indonesian: Tsunami Selat Sunda 2018) occurred on 22 December 2018 at around 21:38 local time after large parts of the southwestern side of Anak Krakatoa collapsed onto its caldera. The landslide spawned a tsunami wave that struck multiple coastal regions in Banten and Lampung, including the tourist destination of Anyer.

Lack of warnings on the arrival of the tsunami, coinciding with the Christmas and New Year holiday season in the nation and the tsunami occurring at nighttime, contributed to the large loss of life. With 426 deaths, the tsunami was the deadliest volcanic tsunami in Indonesia since the 1883 Krakatoa tsunami, which originated from the same island.

Following the tsunami, Indonesian authorities installed multiple emergency early warning systems in tsunami-prone areas. The newer system would detect any significant disturbances on water levels, including changes caused by volcanic activity or undersea landslide.

== Background ==
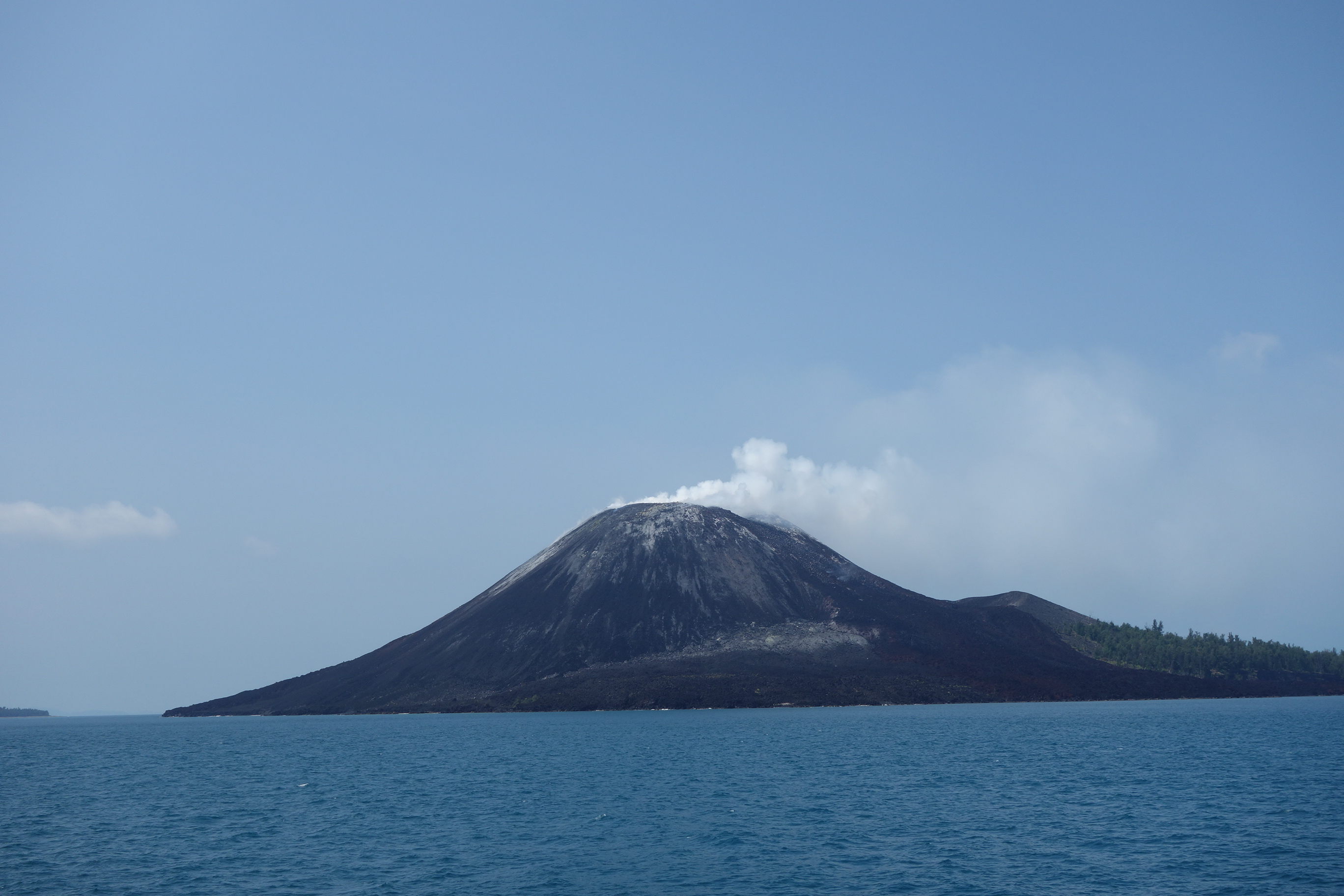
Anak Krakatau in 2013 five years before the eruption

Lying on the Ring of Fire, Indonesia experiences frequent earthquakes and is home to 127 active volcanoes. One such volcano is Krakatoa in the Sunda Strait. The volcano was famous for its historic eruption in 1883, one of the most violent eruptions in recorded history. That eruption, through tsunamis and ash fall, killed more than 36,000 people, many of whom lived in the same regions where the 2018 tsunami struck. The 1883 eruption was violent enough to destroy the majority of the island, causing it to collapse into its caldera.

Approximately 45 years after the historic eruption of Krakatoa in 1883, Anak Krakatau ("Child of Krakatau") rose out of the sea where the old Krakatau volcano had collapsed. Since then, Anak Krakatau had grown to a height of around 338 m (1,109 ft) above sea level. Its frequent volcanic activity poses risks to the nearby coastal regions and seafarers. As such, in 1980, the Indonesian government set up a permanent volcano observatory in the island to observe its activity and to prevent another disastrous event in the region.

An investigation in 1928 during the volcano's re-emergence found that the western slope had grown considerably steeper than its eastern slope, which was caused by the strong current in the region and the steep wall of its basin. Researchers reported in 1995 that the subsequent eruptions of Anak Krakatau did not result in an infilling of the caldera and thus concluded that the possibility of a sector collapse could not be excluded. In 2012, a study conducted by international researchers suggested the possibility of a major sector collapse on Anak Krakatau at some point in the future, which could produce dangerous tsunami waves. The hypothetical tsunami from Anak Krakatau was calculated to reach an initial height of 43 meters before finally striking the western coast of Java and southeastern coast of Sumatra at a height of approximately 2–3 meters, considerably lower than that in 1883. However, owing to the population density in the region, insufficient mitigation measures could cause significant numbers of deaths and major damage to the area.

In the months leading up to the 2018 tsunami, Anak Krakatau had seen increased activity. Starting in June 2018, Anak Krakatau saw an increase of volcanic activity with a Strombolian eruption, producing lava flows and ash plumes as high as 5 km. One day prior to the collapse, on 21 December, an eruption was observed which lasted more than two minutes and produced an ash cloud 400 metres (1,300 ft) high.

== Tsunami ==
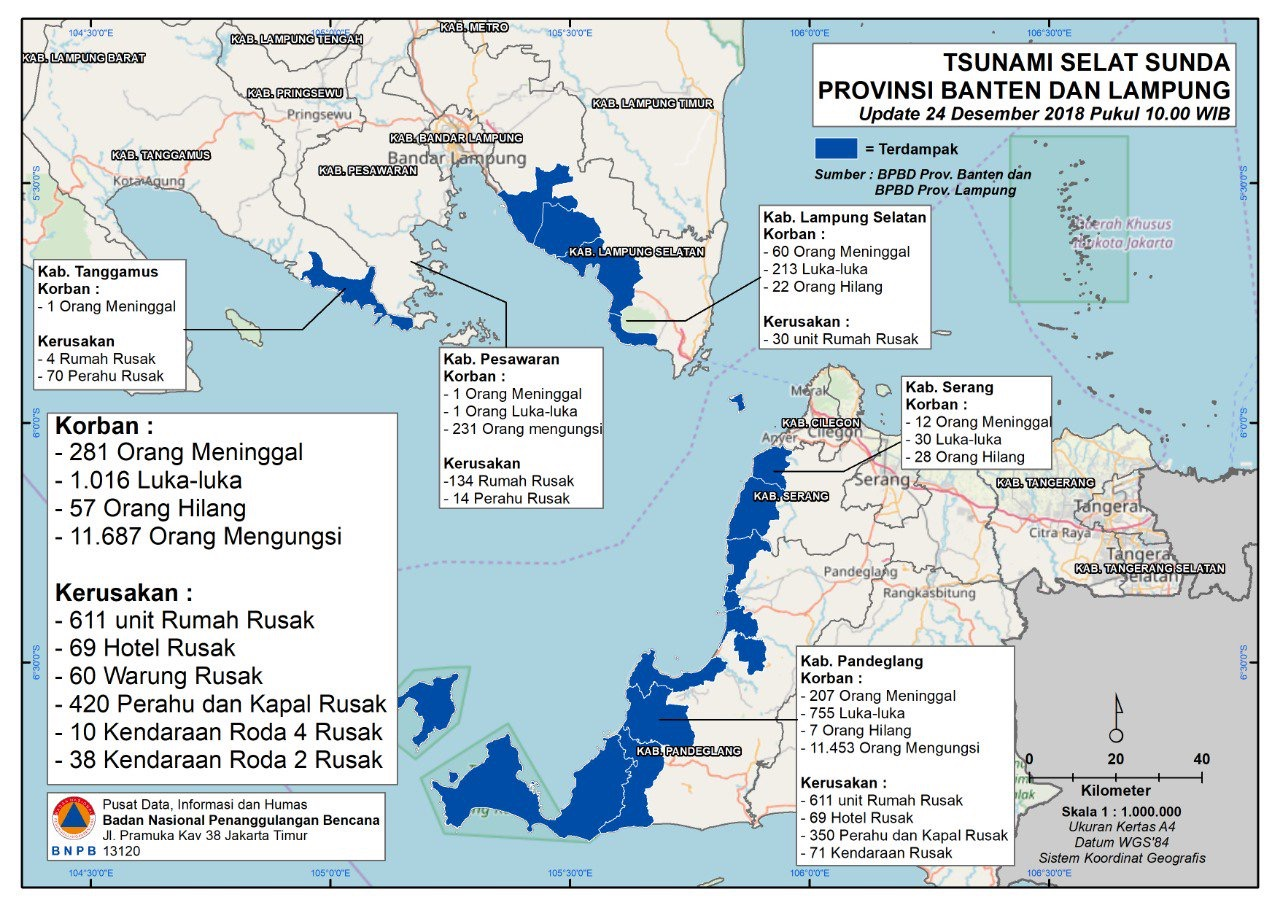
Affected area across the Sunda Strait.

The Volcanological Survey of Indonesia (PVMBG) recorded a dramatic increase in activity of Anak Krakatau. On 22 December, from 12:00 to 18:00 local time, a total of 423 eruptions were recorded by the agency. The danger level of the volcano was increased to Level 2. Authorities warned people not to conduct any activities within two kilometres (1.2 mi) of the volcano.

On 22 December 2018, at 21:03 local time (14:03 UTC), Anak Krakatau erupted and damaged local seismographic equipment, though a nearby seismographic station detected continuous tremors. A large part of the volcano's southwestern side broke off and fell into the sea, causing a tsunami. Officials stated that approximately 64 hectares (160 acres) of the volcano had collapsed into the ocean. The collapse caused the height of the volcano to be reduced from 338 to 110 metres (1,109 to 361 ft).

The Meteorology, Climatology, and Geophysical Agency (BMKG) detected a tsunami around 21:27 local time (14:27 UTC) at the western coast of Banten, even though the agency had not detected any preceding tectonic events. The Indonesian National Agency for Disaster Countermeasure (BNPB) spokesman Sutopo Purwo Nugroho said, "Dozens of buildings were destroyed by the wave, which hit beaches in Lampung and Banten about 21:30 local time (14:30 UTC) on Saturday." According to The Jakarta Post, authorities said that the tsunami "may have been triggered by an abnormal tidal surge due to a full Moon and an underwater landslide following the eruption of Anak Krakatau." The BMKG initially refused to label the event as a tsunami, claiming that it was a "normal" high tide and that no tsunami had occurred on the coast of Banten.

Previously, BMKG had issued a high wave warning for the waters of the strait. Tide gauges measured the tsunami at around 90 centimetres (35 in) in Serang and 30 centimetres (12 in) in Lampung, on top of the two-metre (6 ft 7 in) high tide. While Indonesia possesses a tsunami warning system for tsunamis caused by earthquakes, there is none for volcanic tsunamis. Hence there were no early warnings. On 23 December, satellite data and helicopter footage confirmed that the southwest sector of the volcano had collapsed, which triggered the tsunami, and that the main volcanic conduit was erupting from underwater, producing Surtseyan-style activity.

The waves struck about 313 kilometres (194 mi) of coastline with various heights. In Carita, the waves reportedly struck with a height of at least two metres (6 ft 7 in), while in Tanjung Lesung a height of more than five metres (16 ft) was reported. Further surveys conducted on 31 December by the Ministry of Maritime Affairs and Fisheries, with assistance from Tohoku University and Chuo University, revealed that the tsunami struck the coastline of Banten and Lampung at a height of 13.4 metres (44 ft).

Øystein Lund Andersen, a Norwegian volcano photographer who photographed the eruption of Anak-Krakatau prior to the tsunami, described the eruption as "quite heavy". Andersen was alone at the shore when the tsunami waves arrived, but managed to escape: "The wave came out of nowhere," he said, "and within seconds I had to run," he stated in an interview with Forbes. Following the event he published an eyewitness account.

== Casualties ==
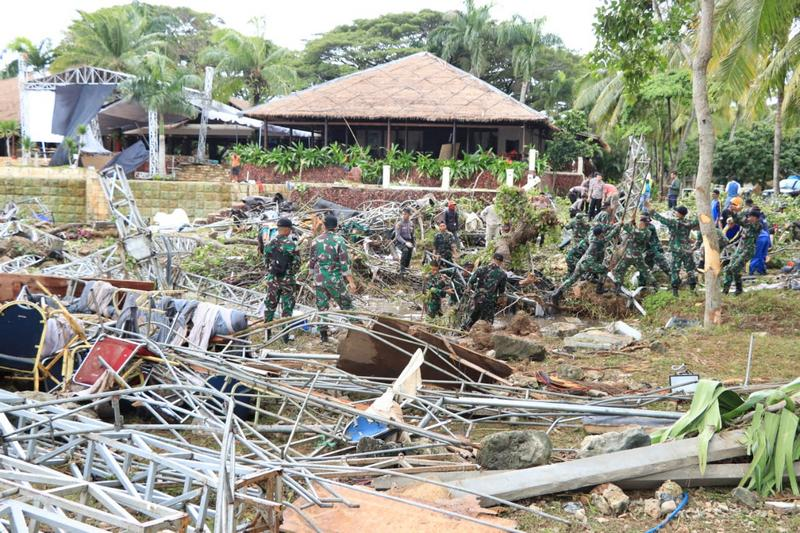
The aftermath of the tsunami at the venue of Seventeen's beachfront concert at Tanjung Lesung

The Indonesian National Board for Disaster Management (BNPB) initially reported 20 deaths and 165 injuries. By the following day, the figure had been revised to 43 deaths — 33 in Pandeglang, seven in South Lampung, and three in Serang Regencies, with 584 injured, and two missing; most of the injuries recorded (491) also occurred in Pandeglang. The death toll was further updated to 62 with 20 missing persons later that day. Missing persons were also reported from small islands that are part of Pandeglang Regency. By 13:00 local time on 23 December, BNPB had confirmed 168 fatalities and 745 injuries with 30 having been reported as missing, and the figure was further increased to 281 dead and 1,016 injured. As of 31 December, the death toll was 437, with 14,059 reported injured and 24 missing. Indonesian officials later revised the death toll to 426, with 24 reported missing and at least 7,202 injured in total.

The areas of Pandeglang Regency struck by the wave included beaches that are popular tourist destinations, such as Tanjung Lesung. The tsunami struck during peak season, where hundreds had arrived to celebrate the Christmas and New Year holiday. In Pandeglang, the popular pop group Seventeen was performing a concert when the tsunami struck without warning. A pasar malam (funfair) was also being held in Sumur District, Pandeglang. Eyewitnesses from the funfair recalled the tsunami struck with a height nearly as high as the light pole, with dozens, including children, reportedly dragged by the rushing wave.

Indonesian officials stated that most of those who died were found inside villas and hotels, especially those located at Carita Beach, Banten. At least 24 people were killed inside a single villa in Carita, with dozens more reportedly found inside other villas. Indonesian Navy stated that dozens of bodies were also recovered from the sea.

Among the victims were Aa Jimmy, an Indonesian actor and comedian, and several members of the Indonesian band Seventeen — bassist Awal "Bani" Purbani, guitarist Herman Sikumbang, road manager Oki Wijaya, and crewmember Ujang was declared to be dead at the scene. After one day being announced missing, drummer Windu Andi Darmawan and Dylan Sahara, wife of Seventeen's vocalist Ifan were reported to have been found dead. A video circulated online showing the band's stage being struck by the tsunami in the middle of their show at Tanjung Lesung, causing it to collapse and the audience to flee. Officials confirmed that dozens of concert-goers had been killed by the tsunami. Tour groups from state-owned company PLN and the Sports and Youth Ministry were also affected by the tsunami. It was confirmed that 260 people had attended the gathering event, where the Seventeen concert was being held. On 23 December, officials from the company stated that at least 14 people related to the PLN had been killed, 89 people from the company had been declared missing and more than 150 had been injured by the tsunami. This number later rose to 23 in the afternoon. On 25 December, it was announced that 43 people from PLN had been killed, while 156 others survived. Most of them were killed while watching the Seventeen concert.

== Impact ==
=== Damage ===
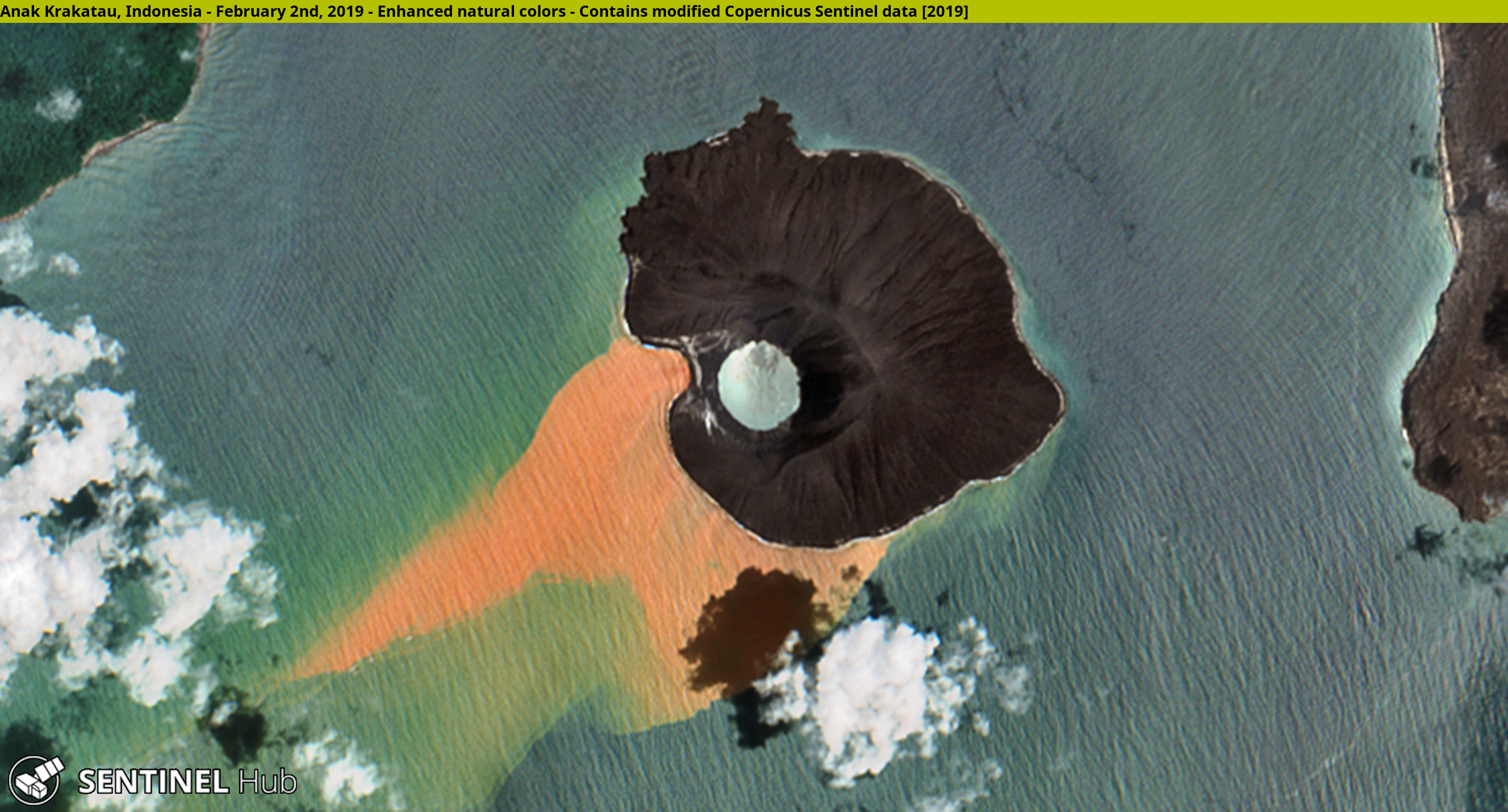
Anak Krakatau, seen from space in February 2019, more than a month after the collapse. The photo showed a large-scale deformation on the southwest side of the volcano, with sediments flowing towards the sea.

Widespread damages were reported throughout southern Lampung and the eastern coast of Banten, particularly in Pandeglang. More than 400 structures, including villas and resorts, were heavily damaged or destroyed by the tsunami. In Sumur District, Pandeglang Regency, a village was virtually wiped out by the tsunami. Sumur District was considered to be the most heavily affected. 7 other villages in Pandeglang were also regarded as the most heavily affected villages. There were widespread reports of blackout in the affected areas in Banten. The Indonesian state owned electric company PLN reported that at least 248 of their power stations were affected and 41 power lines were toppled by the tsunami. However, there were no electricity problems reported in Lampung. The road connecting Serang and Pandeglang was cut off. South Lampung Regency was the worst affected regency in Lampung, with 4 districts: Kalianda, Rajabasa, Sidomulyo, and Katibung, were listed as the most heavily affected districts.

The tsunami however did not damage much vital infrastructure. Telecommunications in Banten and Lampung were not heavily affected. There were reports that several base transceiver station were temporarily inoperable. 2 days after the tsunami, authorities stated that 99% of telecommunication network in the affected areas had been restored. Electricity in Sumur District, regarded as the most heavily affected area, was restored within 48-hour. Communication was fully restored on 28 December 5 days after the disaster.

The Indonesian government stated that the tsunami caused an estimated total damage of 150 billion rupiah in Tanjung Lesung alone, which is a popular tourist hotspot located in Pandeglang Regency. At least 30% of structures in Tanjung Lesung were damaged or destroyed. Experts stated that Tanjung Lesung would need at least 6 months to fully recover from the tsunami. The Government of South Lampung Regency reported a preliminary damage cost of 202 billion rupiah.

=== Effect on local economy ===
As the tsunami struck the region popular with tourist and due to the fact that another tsunami had struck Indonesia in September, the presence of another tsunami in December caused substantial fears among Indonesians to travel to or near the beach. Fishermen in Pacitan, East Java decided not to fish due to fears of tsunami. The Indonesian tourism industry was hit hard. 90% of reservations in Anyer, Banten was cancelled due to the tsunami. Travel industry throughout the country reported a drop in reservations and incomes. Popular beaches in South Lampung had to be closed due to the tsunami. In Ancol, Jakarta, there were reports of significant drop in tourist arrival.

=== Lessons ===
The 2018 Sunda Strait tsunami highlighted several critical areas for improvement in disaster preparedness and response. This includes volcanic Tsunami awareness; this event underscored the need for greater awareness of tsunamis caused by volcanic activity, not just earthquakes. This led to increased research and education efforts worldwide on volcanic tsunami hazards. There has also been a resurgence in early warning systems; the lack of a specific warning system for volcanic tsunamis prompted Indonesia and other countries to reassess and upgrade their tsunami detection and alert mechanisms. Many countries have since integrated volcanic activity into their tsunami warning protocols. The disaster emphasized the importance of monitoring multiple hazards simultaneously. As a result, many countries have adopted more comprehensive, integrated approaches to natural disaster monitoring.

Additionally the event led to improvements in emergency response procedures, with many countries updating their disaster management plans to better handle complex, cascading events. These rapid response protocols could mitigate many future disasters. There has also been a global push to better educate coastal communities about various tsunami risks and appropriate evacuation procedures. These lessons have collectively contributed to more robust and comprehensive disaster preparedness strategies worldwide, potentially saving lives in future events.

=== Rising volcanic activity ===
After the disaster on 22 December, the volcanic activity of Anak Krakatau skyrocketed. A massive eruption occurred on 26 December and the sound of the eruption was noticeably heard by residents in Cianjur, West Java and Ogan Komering Ulu, South Sumatra, which was located more than 200 km from the volcano. Most people compared the sound of the eruption to a bomb blast or gas tank explosion. The BMKG stated that sensors would be installed around the volcano and that the volcano would be observed intensively due to its unstable condition. On 27 December, the status of the volcano was raised to Level 3, the second highest danger level. Residents were not allowed to conduct any activities within 5 km of the volcano.

== Response ==
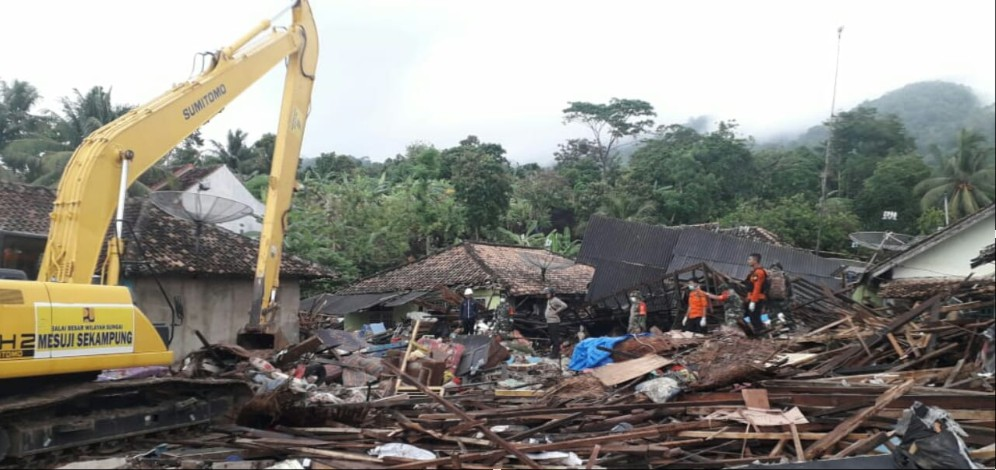
Heavy equipment and soldiers were dispatched to assist the search and rescue efforts. Lampung, Sumatra, 24 December 2018.

=== Domestic ===
President of Indonesia Joko Widodo ordered an immediate field response by BNPB, the Social Ministry, and the Indonesian National Armed Forces. Vice President Jusuf Kalla held an emergency meeting with Minister of Public Works and Public Housing Basuki Hadimuljono, Minister of Administrative and Bureaucratic Reform Syafruddin and the Directorate General of Indonesia's Ministry of Public Works and Public Housing Danis Hidayat Sumadilaga in Jakarta to discuss the management of the disaster. The Ministry of Tourism temporarily halted all promotion for tourism to Lampung and Banten. An emergency response period was set up, spanning two weeks for Pandeglang and a week for South Lampung. The emergency response period in South Lampung Regency was later extended to 19 January 2019. The Ministry of Health sent a freezer container to Pandeglang. Ministry of Internal Affairs stated that emergency funds would be provided to repair damaged government buildings in Banten and Lampung. Minister of State-owned enterprises of Indonesia Rini Soemarmo donated 3 billion rupiah from her ministry to the survivors. The Coordinating Minister for Human Development and Culture Puan Maharani stated that the government would provide a 15 million rupiah compensation to each of the victims. Indonesian National Board for Disaster Management would provide 500 million rupiah to the affected areas.

On 26 December, President Joko Widodo examined the damage in Pandeglang Regency. He would supervise the search and rescue efforts in the affected areas. On his second visit on 2 January, he ordered every local officials in Lampung and Banten to relocate, reconstruct and to "redesign" the coastal residential and commercial zone that are located on the coast. This order was then forwarded to every head of the local governments in Indonesia, especially those who live in an earthquake and tsunami prone area.

The Indonesian Central Government stated that 1 billion rupiah of aid would be provided to the local governments in Banten and Lampung. The Government of Serang Regency provided aid funds of 4 billion rupiah for the rehabilitation process. On 27 December, the Indonesian Government announced that additional aid worth 1 billion rupiah would be sent to the survivors. The Indonesian Ministry of Social Affairs announced that 7 community kitchen were set up across Pandeglang, while 5 others were set up in Lampung. Government of West Java sent volunteers, assessment team and emergency funds to Banten. The Government of Central Java sent 49 volunteers and deployed 6 trucks carrying aid worth Rp 492 million. Government of Banten announced that they would build 700 new permanent houses for the survivors of the tsunami. In South Lampung Regency, the Indonesian National Board for Disaster Management announced that they would build temporary housing for the survivors.

A landslide tsunami in Indonesia is regarded as a rare occurrence by the Indonesian National Board for Disaster Management. Thus, it is not considered as an imminent threat and therefore authorities often do not pay enough attention to it. Due to this fact, the Indonesian Coordinating Ministry for Maritime held a joint discussion with the Indonesian Meteorology, Climatology, and Geophysical Agency, the Indonesian Agency for Assessment and Application of Technology, geological agencies and the Indonesian Institute of Sciences to investigate and to study the tsunami and Mount Anak Krakatau.

Multiple political parties sent aids, volunteers, ambulances and logistics to the affected areas. The Great Indonesia Movement Party announced that a community dinner would be held for the survivors of the tsunami. One of the party's wing, the Kesehatan Rakyat Indonesia (Indonesian People's Healthcare), had sent logistics, volunteers and clothes to Pandeglang. The East Java branch of the NasDem Party sent trucks carrying logistics to Banten. Head of the National Awakening Party Muhaimin Iskandar urged his party's MPs to "secure" the funds that had been relocated by the government for disaster mitigation and to collaborate for further coordination in the handling of the disaster. The Prosperous Justice Party sent volunteers to the group of islands in Sunda Strait that were cut off by the tsunami to distribute aids. Crescent Star Party set up a command center in Serang Regency, Banten for the management of the aids distribution. The Speaker of the People's Representative Council Bambang Soesatyo issued a recommendation to the Indonesian Regional Board for Disaster Management and the Meteorology, Climatology, and Geophysical Agency to fix the "disaster early warning systems" in Indonesia.

More than a dozen state-owned enterprises of Indonesia offered assistance to the survivors of the tsunami. The Indonesian petrol company Pertamina sent 27,000 LPG tanks to Pandeglang and 200 liters of petroleum to Legundi Island, Lampung. Heavy equipment such as excavator were sent to Banten and Lampung. The state-owned pharmaceutical company Bio Farma sent vaccines and a medical team. Free vaccinations was also provided by the company. Ignasius Jonan, Minister of Energy and Mineral Resources, dispatched 17 Emergency Response Teams from his ministry to the affected areas. Telkomsel sent 400 units of sembako, dozens of instant food, blankets, and other essential supplies worth 170 million rupiah.

The Indonesian Red Cross created a website for the families whose relatives went missing in the tsunami. 300 Indonesian Red Cross volunteers from Banten were sent to Serang and Pandeglang. Banser, a Nahdlatul Ulama affiliated organisation, sent hundreds of volunteers to the affected areas.

More than 5,000 people were displaced by the tsunami, with 3,050 people in Pandeglang Regency, Banten and more than 2,500 in Lampung. Local mosques and fields were turned into evacuation centres. In Lampung, the regional government buildings were declared as crisis centres and as evacuation centres. On 2 January, officials announced that nearly 40,000 people had evacuated to the nearest evacuation centres, of whom more than 22,000 were from Pandeglang Regency and nearly 8,000 were from Lampung. In Pandeglang, more than 12,000 people evacuated due to trauma from the tsunami, while the other 10,000 evacuated as their houses had been either damaged or destroyed. 41 schools were turned into evacuation centres.

Following the tsunami, a malfunction caused the tsunami warning siren at a Pandeglang village to ring and prompted residents to evacuate. Meanwhile, the Indonesian National Board for Disaster Management warned coastal residents that there was a possibility that another tsunami would strike the region again, citing the unstable condition of the slope due to the landslide. Officials announced that at least 2 new cracks, one of which was 1 km long, had been formed on the volcano and that these cracks could widen if a magnitude 3.4 earthquake or stronger occur near the volcano, which could cause another landslide and could trigger another devastating tsunami. Residents who lived within 1 km of the coastline were evacuated.

In response to the tsunami, Facebook activated its safety check. In social media, thousands of Indonesians offered their condolences and started online fundraising. Charity lines were set up and charity concerts were also conducted throughout the country. Prayer services for the victims were also held throughout the country.

=== International ===
Hours after the event, Australian Prime Minister Scott Morrison offered aid for the affected areas. Aids were also sent by Oxfam Australia. Indian Prime Minister Narendra Modi also offered condolences and help. Queen Elizabeth, along with Prince Philip, also offered their condolences. Chinese President Xi Jinping and South Korean President Moon Jae-in also offered their condolences and wished for quick recovery for the victims. Malaysian Deputy Prime Minister Wan Azizah Wan Ismail also offered assistance. Singaporean President Halimah Yacob and Singaporean Prime Minister Lee Hsien Loong also sent a letter of condolence to President Joko Widodo. The Singapore Red Cross pledged S$50,000 in humanitarian aid and would send volunteers and medical team to Banten and Lampung. A public fundraising conducted by the Singapore Red Cross managed to collect a total of S$80,000, which would be used for buying aids and supplies for the survivors. U.S. President Donald Trump sent condolences and prayers to the victims, stating that "America is with you". Pope Francis sent condolences to Indonesia, asking people to pray for the victims. Later on, the Pope sent his contribution to the relief efforts through the Vatican's Dicastery for Promoting Integral Human Development. Russian President Vladimir Putin phoned President Joko Widodo and offered his condolences. New Zealand Prime Minister Jacinda Ardern extended her condolences and offered relief and recovery efforts to Indonesia following the tsunami. New Zealand Minister of Foreign Affairs Winston Peters stated that the government would send $1.5 million to help the recovery efforts through the International Federation of the Red Cross. Japanese Prime Minister Shinzo Abe immediately phoned President Joko Widodo to offer his condolences and also stated that Japan would provide aid to Indonesia. Israeli Foreign Ministry offered "profound sympathies" for the affected. Israel-based international humanitarian aid agency IsraAID sent emergency response team to Banten and Lampung. Philippines President Rodrigo Duterte ordered several national government agencies to prepare the financial assistance to Indonesia. Taiwan Foreign Ministry announced that the Taiwanese Government would donate US$500,000 to support relief efforts in Indonesia. The European Union extended their sympathies for the victims and announced that they would provide €80,000 for the relief efforts. Jamaica Tourism Minister, Edmund Bartlett, offered assistance through the Global Tourism Resilience and Crisis Management Centre. Japan Governor of Ehime Prefecture Tokihiro Nakamura met with Vice President Jusuf Kalla on 14 January to deliver donations collected from several local governments in Ehime.

The American Jewish Joint Distribution Committee provided health services, aids and supplies for the survivors. The international humanitarian organisation Islamic Relief provided aids and essential supplies to the affected, stating that they were working together with local humanitarian organisation PKPU Human Initiative. Baltimore-based Catholic Relief Services sent emergency team and provided temporary shelter for the survivors. Christian Aid sent medical team to the affected areas. The Malaysian Consultative Council for Islamic Organisations (MAPIM) sent volunteers and aids to the survivors. Humanitarian Care Malaysia (MyCARE) also sent basic aids to the survivors. Médecins Sans Frontières sent medical team and provided mobile clinics and health services to the survivors.

In the aftermath of the tsunami, at least 3 countries; Australia, Canada, and United Kingdom, issued travel advice for its citizens.

== See also ==
- List of tsunamis affecting Indonesia
- 2022 Hunga Tonga–Hunga Haʻapai eruption and tsunami
- 2018 Sulawesi earthquake and tsunami
- 2009 Samoa earthquake and tsunami
- 2004 Indian Ocean earthquake and tsunami
- 1888 Ritter Island eruption and tsunami
- 1792 Unzen earthquake and tsunami
- 1883 Krakatoa eruption and tsunami
