= List of entertainers who died during a performance =

Through history, many entertainers have died while performing live or while recording a performance. The following list excludes deaths involving film and television stunt persons, as they are listed separately.

== 17th century ==
- 1673:
  - Molière, the French actor and playwright, who suffered from pulmonary tuberculosis, died after being seized by a violent coughing fit while playing the title role in his play Le Malade imaginaire (The Imaginary Invalid). However, he did not die on stage — as he was able to finish the play — but died a few minutes later at his home. The superstition that green brings bad luck to actors is said to originate from the colour of the clothing he was wearing at the time of his death.

== 19th century ==
- 1817:
  - An actor known as Mr. Cummins died on stage while playing the part of Dumont in The Tragedy of Jane Shore by Nicholas Rowe, at the Leeds Theatre in Hunslet. He died of "ossification of the heart" (aortic stenosis) on 20 June having uttered his final words from the play "May such befall me at my latest hour ...".
- 1829:
  - Sam Patch, an American daredevil, died in Rochester, New York, during a jump into the High Falls of the Genesee River. He had successfully leapt into High Falls one week previously.
- 1844:
  - Dancer Clara Vestris Webster's dress caught fire during The Revolt of the Harem at Theatre Royal, Drury Lane. Webster was badly burned and died three days later.
- 1861:
  - The four Gale sisters were a team of British ballerinas who were appearing at Philadelphia's Continental Theater. They were among eight dancers who died when Zelia Gale's gauze dress caught on fire from a gas tube. The deadly flames spread to the other three sisters Hannah, Ruth, and Adeline when they tried to rescue their sibling.
- 1872:
  - Lion tamer Thomas Macarte, known as Massarti the Lion Tamer, who had previously lost an arm when attacked by one of the lions, entered the lion's cage for a performance with a travelling menagerie in Bolton market on 3 January. Attacked by the lions, he attempted to fight them off with his sword and a pistol loaded with blanks but they overcame him. Although other members of the show eventually forced the animals back into an inner cage they dragged Macarte with them. Eventually rescued, he died on the way to the hospital.
- 1873:
  - The actress Matilda Pascaly died from injuries suffered on stage while playing the part of an angel in Don Juan de Maraña. Stagehands mishandled her wires and sent her crashing upside down into a wall.
- 1882:
  - The actress Annie Von Behren died during a performance of Si Slocum at Cincinnati's Coliseum when a firearm wielded by her castmate, Frank Frayne, accidentally discharged, shooting her in the head.
- 1888:
  - Frederick Federici had a heart attack as he descended through a trap door just after singing his last note as Mephistopheles in Gounod's opera Faust at the Princess Theatre in Melbourne.
- 1897:
  - Operatic bass Armand Castelmary died onstage at New York City's Metropolitan Opera House during a performance of Friedrich von Flotow's Martha. The audience, believing his collapse to be a stroke of brilliant acting, rewarded him with a loud ovation as the curtain was lowered.

== 20th century ==
- 1903:
  - Aerialist Nellie Reed, performing in the musical Mr. Blue Beard, was one of the 602 victims of the Iroquois Theatre fire in Chicago, Illinois, on 30 December. Reed's role was to fly as a fairy over the audience on a trolley wire, showering them with pink carnations. She was trapped above the stage while waiting for her entrance and fell during the fire. She died from burns and internal injuries three days later.
- 1904:
  - Emil Hasda, a Polish comic actor, took six curtain calls after a performance in Nimptsch, Germany (now part of Poland), on 11 April before shooting himself in the head in front of the audience, apparently because a female member of the company had rejected his marriage proposal.
- 1911:
  - On 9 May: Sigmund Neuberger, a vaudeville performer known as "The Great Lafayette", died in Edinburgh's Empire Palace Theatre while performing his "Lion's Bride" illusion after a stage lamp sparked a fire that killed Neuberger, his double, the lion, and ten other performers.
- 1912:
  - William Theodore Brailey, Roger Marie Bricoux, John Frederick Preston Clarke, Wallace Hartley, John Law Hume, Georges Alexandre Krins, Percy Cornelius Taylor, and John Wesley Woodward were the eight musicians hired to entertain on board the RMS Titanic. The band reportedly continued playing music until the sinking ship's last moments in an effort to calm the passengers.
- 1918:
  - William Ellsworth Robinson, a magician performing in the yellowface stage identity of "Chung Ling Soo", was shot in the chest on stage during a bullet catch illusion gone wrong.
- 1920:
  - Aviator and movie actor Ormer Locklear crashed in an airplane he was piloting while filming a nighttime movie scene for the movie The Skywayman.
- 1922:
  - Eugenie Blair, actress, was performing in the original production of Anna Christie. Despite feeling unwell and suffering a headache, she declined the opportunity to be replaced by an understudy. After completing her last scene, she went offstage to sit down and died in the chair.
- 1924:
  - Jack Pleasants, music hall entertainer, is said to have dropped dead on stage at age 49 during a pantomime performance.
- 1930:
  - Cinematographer Conrad Wells, director Kenneth Hawks, six other crew members and two pilots were killed in a two-plane collision off the Santa Monica coast while filming aerial scenes for the film Such Men Are Dangerous.
- 1931:
  - Acrobat Lillian Leitzel died after falling from her rigging during a performance in Copenhagen.
- 1937:
  - Louis Vierne, a French organist and composer, died while performing his 1,750th organ recital on 2 June 1937, at the Cathedral of Notre Dame in Paris.
- 1938:
  - On 1 April 1938, actor Joseph Greenwald died during a West Coast premiere performance of Golden Boy at the Lobero Theatre in Santa Barbara, California. Greenwald collapsed and died on the stage after saying the line "I wait for this moment all my life."
- 1941:
  - British swing bandleader Ken "Snakehips" Johnson died while performing at the Café de Paris, London, when it was hit by a German bomb in the Blitz during the Second World War.
- 1943:
  - Albert Stoessel was conducting an orchestra for the American Academy of Arts and Letters in New York, when he died of a heart attack on 12 May 1943.
- 1944:
  - Aroldo Lindi, a 55-year-old Swedish tenor, died during a performance of Pagliacci in San Francisco after finishing the aria "Vesti la giubba".
- 1951:
  - Concert pianist Simon Barere died of a cerebral hemorrhage at Carnegie Hall while playing Grieg's Piano Concerto.
- 1953:
  - Gaetano Merola, San Francisco Opera General Director and co-founder, collapsed and died of a heart attack on August 30, while conducting an outdoor concert in Stern Grove. San Francisco legend is that he fell as soprano Brunetta Mazzolina, singing "Un bel dí" from Madama Butterfly by Giacomo Puccini, reached the word "morir", meaning "to die".
- 1955:
  - Actress Isabel Bonner suffered a heart attack while on stage at the Carthay Circle Theatre in Los Angeles, during a performance of The Shrike.
- 1958:
  - Katsuki Hiromi, a Takarazuka Revue actress, died during the 1 April performance of Spring Dance at Takarazuka Grand Theater in Takarazuka, Japan. Her clothes were caught in a stage lift, which ripped her body in two.
  - Gareth Jones was portraying a character who died of a heart attack in a live science fiction play Underground in ABC Television's Armchair Theatre television series (30 November) when he died of a real heart attack between his scenes. The actors and director improvised to account for his absence.
  - Comedian Harry Einstein, father of Albert Brooks and Bob Einstein (the latter also known for his Super Dave Osborne character), died almost immediately after performing as "Parkyakarkus" (a pun on "park your carcass"), at the Friars Club of Beverly Hills roast of Lucille Ball and Desi Arnaz. When he died, he collapsed onto Milton Berle.
  - Tyrone Power was stricken by a massive heart attack while filming a dueling scene with his frequent co-star and friend George Sanders for the film Solomon and Sheba. He died while being transported to the hospital in Madrid on 15 November, aged 44.
  - South African actor Morry Barling suddenly died onstage during a performance at the National Theatre, Launceston, Tasmania, Australia.
- 1960:
  - Actor Louis Jean Heydt died of a heart attack upon conclusion of the first act of the Boston production of There Was a Little Girl, also featuring Jane Fonda.
  - Singer Leonard Warren died after performing in the opera La forza del destino at the New York Metropolitan Opera. He had sung Don Carlo's act III aria, which begins Morir, tremenda cosa ("to die, a momentous thing"), when he started coughing and gasping. He fell face first to the ground and it was revealed he had died of a massive heart attack.
  - Pianist and conductor Dimitri Mitropoulos died of a heart attack on 2 November while conducting a rehearsal of Mahler's Third Symphony at Milan's La Scala Opera House.
- 1961:
  - Actor Alan Marshal died on stage while appearing with Mae West in her play Sextette in Chicago.
  - Composer Joseph E. Howard, best known for co-writing "Hello! Ma Baby" and "I Wonder Who's Kissing Her Now", died onstage at Chicago Opera House on 19 May. He collapsed with a heart attack while taking a curtain call after having led the audience in a singalong of the song "Let Me Call You Sweetheart".
- 1962:
  - German conductor Franz Konwitschny died of a heart attack while conducting a rehearsal in Belgrade on 28 July.
- 1965:
  - Wagnerian bass-baritone Hermann Uhde died on stage of a heart attack during a performance in Copenhagen's Royal Danish Theatre on 10 October 1965.
- 1966:
  - Vaudeville doubletalk comedian Al Kelly died immediately following his performance at the New York Friars Club roast of Joe E. Lewis, after returning to his seat on the dais and during the applause.
- 1967:
  - Singer and actor Nelson Eddy, famous for his roles in such movie musicals as Rose Marie, died on 6 March after suffering a cerebral hemorrhage while performing onstage at a Miami Beach hotel.
  - Comedian and singer Jodie "Butterbeans" Edwards, the surviving member of the long-running vaudeville duo Butterbeans and Susie, died on 28 October as he walked onstage at the Dorchester Inn outside Chicago.
- 1968:
  - Joseph Keilberth, conductor, died in Munich after collapsing while conducting Wagner's Tristan und Isolde at the Bavarian State Opera, in exactly the same place as Felix Mottl did in 1911.
- 1969:
  - Professional wrestler Mike DiBiase suffered a heart attack in the ring while wrestling his opponent Man Mountain Mike on 2 July in Lubbock, Texas. CPR was unsuccessful, and an autopsy revealed coronary artery disease. DiBiase was the adoptive father of wrestling star Ted DiBiase.
  - Country music star Spade Cooley died from a heart attack while backstage during the intermission of a benefit concert in Oakland, California, on 23 November. Cooley was serving a life term in prison for beating his wife to death in front of their daughter, and played the show on a weekend furlough. He was scheduled to be paroled three months later, in February 1970.
  - Performer Kenneth Horne, star of the radio comedy show Round the Horne, died of a heart attack while hosting the annual Guild of Television Producers' and Directors' Awards at the Dorchester Hotel in London, moments after the show scriptwriters had received an award and Horne had urged the audience to tune into its next series which had been due to commence shortly.
- 1970:
  - 7 November: Noted virtuoso plectrum banjoist Eddie Peabody died from a brain hemorrhage while playing his instrument onstage at the Lookout House Supper Club in Covington, Kentucky.
  - Thai actor Mitr Chaibancha fell to the ground in the last shooting day of his film Insee Thong (Thai: อินทรีทอง, or Golden Eagle). The stunt shot required him to grasp the helicopter's rope ladder, ascend from the ground and fly off into the sunset, serving as the final shot in the film. During filming, he leapt from the ground to seize a rope ladder suspended from the aircraft, attaining only the lowest rung. Unfortunately, the helicopter pilot, oblivious to this, ascended to greater heights. Eventually, Mitr was unable to maintain his grip, falling to the ground. The entire accident was captured on camera. It was left in the final theatrical release but has been removed from DVD versions.
- 1971:
  - Musician Lil Hardin Armstrong, the former wife of Louis Armstrong, was appearing on a Chicago tribute to the jazz legend in August, a month after Louis Armstrong had died. She was playing St. Louis Blues on piano when she had a heart attack and fell to the floor.
  - P. C. Sorcar, an Indian magician, died during a performance at Asahikawa, Hokkaidō, Japan. He was 58.
  - David Burns died while performing in 70, Girls, 70 in Philadelphia.
  - Longevity expert J. I. Rodale was a guest on The Dick Cavett Show. After his interview was done, Pete Hamill was being interviewed by Cavett when Rodale slumped. Hamill, noticing something was wrong, said in a low voice to Cavett, "This looks bad." Rodale had died of a heart attack at age 72. The episode was never aired.
- 1972:
  - Les Harvey, lead guitarist of the Glasgow rock band Stone the Crows, died after being electrocuted by his microphone while performing at Swansea's Top Rank Ballroom.
  - Jazz musician Lee Morgan was murdered by his live-in girlfriend while performing at Slugs' Saloon in New York.
  - Luther Lindsay, one of the first black stars in professional wrestling, died of a heart attack at the end of a match in Charlotte, North Carolina. Lindsay had just delivered his winning move and died while lying on top of his opponent.
- 1975:
  - Predrag Jovičić, vocalist of the Yugoslav rock band San, died from an electric shock during a concert in Čair Hall in Niš.
- 1976:
  - 26 April: British actor Sid James died at 63 after collapsing on stage at the opening night performance of The Mating Season at the Sunderland Empire Theatre.
  - 10 September: Finnish magician Aimo Leikas accidentally shot himself in front of a crowd while performing his Russian roulette act. He had been performing the act for about a year, selecting six bullets from a box of assorted live and dummy ammunition.
  - Godfrey Cambridge, an American comedian, died of a heart attack on the set of Victory at Entebbe at Burbank, California. Cambridge was due to play Idi Amin.
- 1977:
  - Actor Zero Mostel collapsed and died in Philadelphia from an aortic aneurysm during the first preview performance of The Merchant, a Broadway-bound adaptation of The Merchant of Venice.
- 1978:
  - Romanian-Israeli concert pianist Mindru Katz died suddenly onstage of a heart attack on January 30, 1978, while performing Beethoven's "Tempest" sonata in Istanbul.
  - Karl Wallenda died when he lost his balance and fell to his death while tightrope walking on a wire that was suspended 123 feet (37 m) in the air between two buildings in San Juan, Puerto Rico. Local TV station WAPA-TV taped the incident.
  - Cuban singer Miguelito Valdés (Mr Babalú) suffered a fatal heart attack while singing at Hotel Tequendama, Bogotá, Colombia, 8 November 1978.
  - 4 August: Comedian Frank Fontaine died of a heart attack immediately after performing at a benefit show where he had just raised $25,000 for heart research.
- 1979
  - British daredevil Robin Winter-Smith was killed after his motorcycle crashed as he was attempting to jump over a 212-foot (65 m) row of Rolls-Royce automobiles in Hertfordshire.
- 1980:
  - Malayalam cinema actor Jayan was killed in a helicopter accident while refilming a stunt for the action movie Kolilakkam. Jayan was hanging onto the helicopter's landing skids when it crashed and later succumbed to his injuries.
  - Danish actor and comedian Dirch Passer suffered a fatal heart attack backstage immediately prior to going on stage in Tivoli Gardens on 3 September 1980.
- 1981:
  - East German comedian Rolf Herricht on 23 August 1981 died of a heart attack while acting at Metropol Theater in East Berlin.
- 1982:
  - 5 January: Actor Harvey Lembeck suffered a heart attack while performing in an episode of Mork & Mindy and collapsed as he was leaving the stage.
  - 14 April: Actor Arthur Lowe suffered a stroke in his dressing room at the Alexandra Theatre, Birmingham, shortly before a performance of Home at Seven in which he was due to appear with his wife, Joan. He died in the hospital later.
  - Actor Vic Morrow and two children, My-Ca Dinh Le (age 7) and Renee Shin-Yi Chen (age 6), died in an accident while filming on location for the Twilight Zone: The Movie at Indian Dunes in Los Angeles County, California. Morrow, Le, and Chen were filming a scene set during the Vietnam War in which their characters attempt to escape from a pursuing U.S. Army helicopter out of a deserted Vietnamese village. The helicopter was hovering at about 25 feet (7.6 m) above them when pyrotechnic explosions damaged it and caused it to crash on top of them, killing all three instantly.
  - Actor and comedian Joe E. Ross suffered a heart attack and died while performing on stage on the evening of 13 August. His wife reportedly collected just half of Ross's fee because he had failed to do a full show.
- 1983:
  - Musician Rebop Kwaku Baah died of a cerebral hemorrhage while performing in Stockholm.
- 1984:
  - Pianist and singer Tuts Washington died while performing at the World's Fair in New Orleans on 5 August 1984.
  - Actor Jon-Erik Hexum died after shooting himself with a blank pistol. On 12 October 1984, the cast and crew of the TV series Cover Up were filming the seventh episode of the series, "Golden Opportunity", on Stage 17 of the 20th Century Fox lot. One of the scenes filmed that day called for Hexum's character to load blanks into a .44 Magnum handgun. When the scene did not play as the director wanted, there was a delay in filming. Hexum became restless during the delay and began playing around to lighten the mood. He had apparently unloaded all but one blank round when, at 5:15pm, he spun the cylinder and, as if playing Russian roulette, put the revolver to his right temple and pulled the trigger. The force of the blank round was sufficient to dislodge fragments of his skull, which acted as projectiles in lieu of a bullet loaded in the cartridge. The skull fragments were propelled into his brain.
  - Magician and comedian Tommy Cooper suffered a heart attack during a performance on the London Weekend Television variety show Live From Her Majesty's. Cooper was known for getting his illusions deliberately and comically wrong. After Cooper collapsed, his audience laughed for almost a minute, thinking that his stage character had swooned at the appearance of a pretty magician's assistant (even she thought Cooper was improvising a comic bit). The TV show cut away to an unscheduled break. Efforts to revive Cooper backstage failed, and he was taken to a hospital where he was pronounced dead on arrival.
  - Singer Onie Wheeler died of a massive heart attack while performing on the stage of the Grand Ole Opry.
  - British comedian Eric Morecambe collapsed from a heart attack as he left the stage of the Roses Theatre in Tewkesbury following a performance; he died in hospital a few hours later.
  - British actor-comedian Leonard Rossiter died of a heart attack in his dressing room at the Lyric Theatre, London, whilst preparing to go on stage during a performance in Joe Orton's play Loot.
- 1985:
  - Butoh dancer Yoshiyuki Takada was performing The Dance of Birth and Death with a Tokyo artistic troupe, on the side of Seattle's Mutual Life building. His rope broke, and he fell six stories to his death.
  - Italian actor Claudio Cassinelli died on the set of Sergio Martino's Vendetta dal futuro in Page, Arizona. His helicopter crashed against the Navajo Bridge, allegedly due to an error of the pilot, while filming an action scene.
- 1986:
  - Actor Adolph Caesar died of a heart attack on the set of the film Tough Guys.
  - Actress Edith Webster died onstage from a heart attack while performing her death scene in the play The Drunkard, in a lodge in Baltimore. The role called for her to sing "Please Don't Talk About Me When I'm Gone" and then slump to the floor, which she did.
- 1987:
  - Saxophonist Warne Marsh collapsed at a Los Angeles jazz club while soloing on the standard "Out of Nowhere".
  - Comedian Dick Shawn died on stage while performing at the University of California, San Diego after suffering a fatal heart attack. He lay motionless on the stage for several minutes, while audience members (thinking it was part of his act) began shouting comments, such as: "Take his wallet" and "How long is this going to go on?". The stage manager came out to check on Shawn several times before realizing it was not part of the show. A doctor was called up from the audience to perform CPR on the comedian until the paramedics arrived. He was later pronounced dead at Scripps Memorial Hospital.
  - Soviet actor Andrei Mironov suffered a brain aneurysm while performing the title character of Beaumarchais's play The Marriage of Figaro in Riga, on 14 August. He died 2 days later, having never regained consciousness.
  - British wrestler Mal "King Kong" Kirk died of a pre-existing heart condition in the ring. His opponent, Big Daddy, was cleared of all charges as the coroner ruled the fatal attack happened while he was standing, before Big Daddy jumped and landed on him during a match at the Great Yarmouth Hippodrome.
- 1988:
  - On 1 June 1988, Ricky May had a fatal heart attack at the Regent Hotel, Sydney, after getting a standing ovation on the opening night of a new cabaret show. He was pronounced dead on arrival at a hospital. He was 44 years of age.
  - Ferial Karim, a Lebanese actress, died on stage during a performance on 4 July.
- 1989:
  - On 11 February, actor George O'Hanlon died from a stroke during recording sessions for Jetsons: The Movie; the rest of his lines were filled in by Jeff Bergman, who also provided additional lines for Mel Blanc's character, Cosmo Spacely.
  - On 30 May, Italian conductor Giuseppe Patane, 57, died from an apparent heart attack while conducting a performance of The Barber of Seville at the Bavarian State Opera in Munich.
- 1990:
  - Escape artist Joseph W. "Amazing Joe" Burrus died on Halloween when the glass 'coffin' he was attempting to escape from collapsed under the weight of wet cement poured on top of it. Burrus died on the 64th anniversary of the death of Harry Houdini, who was Burrus' inspiration for the performance.
- 1991:
  - Actor Redd Foxx suffered a fatal heart attack on the set of the CBS sitcom The Royal Family. It was noted that initially cast mates on set thought Foxx was only fooling around after he clutched a chair and fell to the floor, since his character on Sanford and Son often faked heart attacks.
- 1992:
  - On 22 February, Polish actor Tadeusz Łomnicki died of a heart attack during one of the last dress rehearsals at the Poznań-based Teatr Nowy of Shakespeare's King Lear, in which he was playing the lead role, much awaited by public and critics. The piece was due to be premiered a week later.
  - On 3 May, Malayalam cinema actor Alummoodan died of a heart attack while performing at the sets of Adwaitham. He died in the arms of co-star Mohanlal while filming.
  - On 10 May, jazz/cabaret singer Sylvia Syms died of a heart attack during a set at New York City's Oak Room at the Algonquin Hotel.
- 1993:
  - Brandon Lee, son of martial artist Bruce Lee, died while filming the movie The Crow in Wilmington, North Carolina. A prop gun had been squib-loaded, causing the blank cartridge to propel the bullet into Lee and kill him. Contrary to urban legend, the footage of his death was not kept in the movie. Instead, they re-shot the scene using a different actor, whose death in the film was by a throwing knife.
  - On 11 June 1993, English comic actor Bernard Bresslaw died of a sudden heart attack in his dressing room at the Open Air Theatre in Regent's Park, London, where he was to play Grumio in the New Shakespeare Company's production of The Taming of the Shrew.
  - On 13 December, professional wrestler Larry Cameron died of a heart attack while wrestling a match with Tony St. Clair in Bremen, Germany. He was 41 years old.
- 1994:
  - Italian actor Gian Maria Volonté died from a heart attack at the age of 61 at Florina, Greece, during the filming of Ulysses' Gaze.
  - Radio disc jockey Jack Spector died during his daily broadcast on Long Island radio station WHLI. His death was discovered when he failed to speak following the end of a record.
- 1995:
  - Country Dick Montana, singer/drummer/guitarist of The Beat Farmers, suffered a massive heart attack and died three songs into the band's set at the Long Horn in Whistler, British Columbia, Canada.
- 1996:
  - Actor Ken Steadman was killed in a dune buggy accident while filming in Victorville, California, for the television show Sliders.
  - Singer Tiny Tim suffered a fatal heart attack while turning to leave the stage during a benefit concert in Minneapolis.
  - Motorcycle daredevil Butch Laswell died in Mesquite, Nevada, attempting to set a new world record by jumping over a 38-foot-high (12 m) pedestrian bridge. While in the air, Laswell was blown off course by crosswinds, pushing him to the left of the landing ramp. He flat-landed and crashed.
  - Turkish singer Zeki Müren died of a heart attack during a live performance on stage at TRT İzmir Television.
  - Opera singer Richard Versalle died on stage at the Metropolitan Opera during the company's première performance of The Makropulos Case when he suffered a heart attack while standing on a sliding ladder attached to a file cabinet. He was stricken after singing the line, "Too bad you can live only so long."
  - Guitarist/singer Johnny "Guitar" Watson collapsed and died onstage during a performance in Yokohama, Japan. The cause of death was a heart attack.
- 1997:
  - English actor Anthony Wheeler died by strangulation while playing Judas Iscariot at a performance of Jesus Christ Superstar in Chalkidiki, Greece. He hanged himself after failing to attach the rope to a safety harness that would have kept pressure from his neck, though he had successfully performed the stunt numerous times over the preceding three years.
  - On stage recreating a scene from the TV series Flodder during a private party for a car importer, Dutch actor Coen van Vrijberghe de Coningh died from a cardiac arrest attempting to jump on the hood of the pink Chevrolet Caprice convertible associated with his character. Filming of what consequently was the last season had wrapped days earlier.
- 1998:
  - Paolo "Feiez" Panigada, member of the Italian band Elio e le Storie Tese, died of a brain haemorrhage while performing onstage at the Roialto club in Milan.
  - English reggae performer Judge Dread died from a heart attack as he walked off stage after performing at The Penny Theatre in Canterbury.
- 1999:
  - Owen Hart, a Canadian-born professional wrestler for WWF, died during Over the Edge, a pay-per-view event, when performing a stunt. It was planned to have Hart come down from the rafters of Kemper Arena on a safety harness tied to a rope to make his ring entrance. The safety latch was released and Hart dropped 78 feet (24 m), bouncing chest-first off the top rope, resulting in a severed aorta, which caused his lungs to fill with blood.
  - Mark Sandman, bassist and lead vocalist for the band Morphine, collapsed on stage at the Giardini del Principe in Palestrina, Latium, Italy (near Rome), while performing with Morphine. He was pronounced dead of a heart attack.
- 2000:
  - On 7 January, professional wrestler Gary Albright suffered a heart attack during a match against Lucifer Grimm in Hazleton, Pennsylvania. Grimm was scheduled to lose the match, and thus rolled Albright's motionless body on top of himself. Albright was carried from the ring and pronounced dead at the scene.
  - Actor Renato Di Paolo was portraying Judas in a passion play outside of Rome on the day before Easter. During the hanging scene he accidentally hanged himself and died soon after.
  - Saudi Arabian singer Talal Maddah collapsed and died suddenly on Al Meftaha Stage (Arabic: مسرح المفتاحة) in front of his fans just after performing the intro to one of his popular oldie songs. The concert was being aired live on Saudi national television.

== 21st century ==
- 2001:
  - Conductor Giuseppe Sinopoli died of a heart attack while conducting Giuseppe Verdi's Aida at the Deutsche Oper Berlin.
- 2002:
  - 23–26 October: During the Nord-Ost Siege at Russia's Dubrovka Theater, 17 actors and members of the orchestra were murdered during the initial terrorist raid or in the following days.
- 2003:
  - 20 February: Ty Longley, guitarist for the band Great White, died in The Station nightclub fire that caused the deaths of 99 other people in West Warwick, Rhode Island. Longley had re-entered the venue after escaping, with conflicting reports that it was either to ensure the safety of friends attending, or to save his guitar.
  - 20 October: New Vagrants drummer Joe Forgione died of a heart attack onstage at the Downtime Club, New York.
  - 26 November: Scottish actor Gordon Reid collapsed and died on stage from a heart attack at the Finborough Theatre, London, halfway through Act Two of a performance of Samuel Beckett's Waiting for Godot.
- 2004:
  - 4 February: Czech actor Jan Odl died on stage of the Antonín Dvořák Theatre (a venue of the National Moravian-Silesian Theatre) in Ostrava while playing the part of Argante in Molière's comedy Scapin the Schemer.
  - 8 December: Dimebag Darrell, ex-guitarist of the heavy metal band Pantera, was murdered on stage by a gunman while performing with his new band Damageplan at the Alrosa Villa in Columbus, Ohio.
- 2005:
  - 20 July: Patrick Sherry, 29, frontman of the UK-based rock band Bad Beat Revue, died of head trauma as a result of a head-first stage dive from a lighting gantry at the Warehouse club in Leeds, fracturing his skull. Sherry's death is recognized by the Guinness Book of World Records as the first fatal stage dive by a musician.
  - 3 October: Franco Scoglio, Italian football manager and sport TV commenter, died of a heart attack while on the air during a program on the Genoan private TV station Primocanale, after a heated discussion over the phone with Genoa chairman Enrico Preziosi. He passed out in his seat while Preziosi continued with his call.
- 2006:
  - 22 February: Classical pianist and multi-award winner Anthony Burger had a massive heart attack while performing a piano piece entitled "Hear My Song, Lord" during a cruise aboard the Holland America cruise ship the Zuiderdam.
  - 4 September: Australian zookeeper, conservationist, and television programmer Steve Irwin was killed by a stingray while filming the nature documentary Ocean's Deadliest in the Great Barrier Reef.
  - 1 December: Ali Khan Samsudin, a snake charmer known as "Snake King" as well as "Scorpion King", died after being bitten by a king cobra during a live performance.
- 2007:
  - 3 October: M. N. Vijayan, an Indian writer, orator and academic, died of cardiac arrest during a televised interview.
- 2008:
  - 13 June: Journalist Tim Russert collapsed and died of a heart attack while recording voiceovers for Meet the Press.
  - 9 November: Miriam Makeba suffered a heart attack shortly after singing her hit song "Pata Pata" in a concert held in Castel Volturno, near Caserta, Italy.
  - 5 December: Icelandic musician Rúnar Júlíusson suffered a heart attack and died while performing on stage in Keflavík, aged 63.
- 2009:
  - 13 June: Japanese wrestler Mitsuharu Misawa suffered a cervical spine injury while receiving a suplex move during a match at the Hiroshima Green Arena, causing fatal cardiac arrest.
- 2010:
  - 24 February: SeaWorld trainer Dawn Brancheau was pulled under the water by the orca Tilikum and drowned toward the end of a "Dine with Shamu" show at SeaWorld Orlando.
  - 16 April: During a performance by the band You Say Party! We Say Die!, drummer Devon Clifford stopped playing and fell onto the floor. After Clifford's death, the band shortened its name to You Say Party!
  - 27 November: Indian folk artist Vitthal Umap died of a heart attack at age 80 after collapsing on stage during a performance in Nagpur.
- 2011:
  - 3 March: Swedish comedian Lasse Eriksson died during the final number of his show Fyra lyckliga män 2 (Four happy men 2) at Reginateatern in Uppsala, Sweden. He was one of Sweden's first stand-up comedians.
- 2012:
  - 23 December: American guitarist Mike Scaccia (Rigor Mortis, Ministry, Revolting Cocks) collapsed on stage during a special Rigor Mortis performance in Fort Worth, Texas. Scaccia was taken to hospital, where he was pronounced dead. The cause of death was listed as a heart attack.
- 2013:
  - 9 June: Acrobat Sarah Guyard-Guillot fell to her death during a performance of the Cirque du Soleil show Kà in Las Vegas.
  - 7 July: Funk ostentação singer and rapper MC Daleste was fatally shot in the abdomen during a free performance in Campinas, São Paulo, before a crowd of four thousand people.
  - 27 July: Mick Farren died on-stage at The Borderline, London, while performing with his band, The Deviants. The cause of death was stated to be a heart attack.
- 2014:
  - 7 December: Italian singer Mango died from a heart attack during a concert in Policoro, province of Matera, while performing his song "Oro".
- 2015:
  - 29 January: conductor Israel Yinon collapsed and died during a concert in Lucerne, Switzerland, in the middle of conducting Strauss's An Alpine Symphony.
  - 21 March: Mexican wrestler Perro Aguayo Jr. suffered fatal cardiac arrest caused by cervical spine damage during a match in Tijuana. The severity of Aguayo's condition was not immediately apparent because he fell awkwardly and was draped limply onto the ring ropes, a position that is typically assumed by opponents of Rey Mysterio, another wrestler in the match.
  - 30 October: Four of the five members of the Romanian metalcore band Goodbye to Gravity died during the Colectiv nightclub fire. The band's pyrotechnics, consisting of sparkler firework candles, ignited the club's flammable polyurethane acoustic foam, and the fire spread rapidly, killing 62 people in total. Guitarists Mihai Alexandru and Vlad Țelea were pronounced dead on the scene, while drummer Bogdan Enache and bassist Alex Pascu died shortly thereafter in the hospital due to injuries sustained in the fire.
- 2016:
  - 3 April: Indonesian dangdut singer Irma Bule died during a performance in Karawang, West Java, after she was bitten by a king cobra she brought on stage as a prop. She continued singing for 45 minutes after being bitten before she collapsed and died.
  - 24 April: Papa Wemba died during a performance around 9:00 pm in Abidjan, Ivory Coast.
  - 15 May: Atlanta Symphony Orchestra Principal Bass Emeritus Jane Little collapsed and died on stage during the last 30 seconds of the orchestra's final encore of "There's No Business Like Show Business", from the musical Annie Get Your Gun by Irving Berlin. Little was 87 years old and had been a member of the orchestra for 71 years.
  - 21 May: Former Megadeth drummer Nick Menza collapsed and died of cardiac arrest during a performance with his band OHM at The Baked Potato in Los Angeles.
  - 10 June: 22-year-old singer Christina Grimmie was fatally shot while signing autographs for fans following a performance at The Plaza Live in Orlando, Florida.
  - 15 June: Milorad Mandić suddenly died of a heart attack onstage during a matinee performance of Peter Pan.
  - 8 October: Taiwanese singer Kuo Chin-fa collapsed on stage during a performance in Kaohsiung. He was then declared dead in a hospital of cardiorespiratory failure.
  - 23 November: Italian guitarist and electronic music producer Alberto Bertapelle, better known by his stage name Brainbug, died of a heart attack during a performance in Tavagnacco of Udine, Italy.
- 2017:
  - 3 January: Nepali actor Bishnu Bhakta Phuyal died while acting on stage. He fainted during a performance at the theater in Kathmandu.
  - 18 March: Former Boston drummer Sib Hashian died after collapsing during a performance on the Legends of Rock cruise.
  - 1 May: Guitarist and jam band performer Colonel Bruce Hampton collapsed and died of a heart attack during a jam at an all-star concert held in honor of his 70th birthday at the Fox Theatre in Atlanta, Georgia. Hampton collapsed in the middle of a performance of "Turn On Your Love Light" while guitarist Brandon Niederauer performed a solo, an action that the other musicians on stage first assumed was humorous act of homage by the older musician to the younger guitarist before they realized Hampton was not moving. Before his death, Hampton had often joked to friends and journalists that he would prefer to die onstage if given the choice.
  - 7 July: Spanish acrobat Pedro Aunión died after falling from a 20-meter height while performing during a musical intermezzo between Alt-J and Green Day at the Mad Cool music festival in Madrid.
  - 19 July: French barefoot singer Barbara Weldens collapsed while performing in a church in Gourdon, France, apparently from electrocution from a faulty cable on the floor.
  - 17 September: Laudir de Oliveira, Brazilian percussionist and former member of the band Chicago, died of a heart attack during a performance in Rio de Janeiro, Brazil.
- 2018:
  - 28 January: Veteran Ottan Thullal artist Kalamandalam Geethanandan collapsed on stage and died during a performance in Irinjalakkuda, Kerala.
  - 6 February: Kathakali dancer Madavoor Vasudevan Nair slumped on stage and died during a performance at the Agasthyakode Mahadeva Temple in Anchal. Kerala.
  - 22 December: Three out of four members of Indonesian band Seventeen were killed after a tsunami caused by the eruption of Anak Krakatau crashed into their concert site at a beach in Tanjung Lesung, Banten. Also killed were band manager Oki Wijaya and Dylan Sahara, the wife of the band's lone survivor Riefian "Ifan" Fajarsyah.
- 2019:
  - 11 March: Argentine singer Sergio Denis suffered a 3-meter (10-foot) fall from the stage during a performance in San Miguel de Tucumán. Unconscious and with a broken shoulder, he was transported to the hospital in which he was induced in a coma. He died without regaining consciousness on 15 May 2020, a year and two months after his fall.
  - 11 April: Comedian Ian Cognito died of a heart attack during a show in Bicester. He is reported to have "sat on a chair and laid back for five minutes," with audience members initially believing it to be part of his routine until the event's compère called an ambulance. A few minutes earlier, Cognito had joked about having a stroke that would cause him to start speaking in Welsh, and said, "Imagine if I died in front of you lot here."
  - 11 May: Luchador Silver King was wrestling a match in Camden Town, London, England, against Juventud Guerrera when he suffered a heart attack.
  - 20 June: Eddie Garcia, Filipino actor, died from a cervical vertebrae fracture after tripping over a cable and falling during the filming of a television series. The incident prompted the Philippine government to enact the "Eddie Garcia Law".
  - 2 September: Joana Sainz García, Spanish singer and dancer of Super Hollywood Orchestra, died in Las Berlanas, Spain, when a pyrotechnic was shot in the wrong direction during an on-stage explosion.
  - 27 November: Godfrey Gao, Taiwanese-Canadian model and actor, died of cardiac arrest while filming the reality TV show Chase Me.
  - 31 December: Juliano Cezar, a Brazilian sertanejo singer, died of a heart attack during a concert in Uniflor, Paraná.
- 2020:
  - 18 January: Singer-songwriter David Olney, 71, died in Santa Rosa Beach, Florida, while at the 30A Songwriters Festival. While performing alongside Amy Rigby, he became motionless. Fellow performer Scott Miller said, "David was playing a song when he paused, said 'I'm sorry' and put his chin to his chest. He never dropped his guitar or fell off his stool. It was as easy and gentle as he was."
- 2021:
  - 18 July: Milan Lasica, Slovak comedian and author, died in Bratislava during his singing performance with Bratislava Hot Serenaders. Just after he finished a song called "I am an Optimist" and gave a bow, he slid down the stage and lost consciousness. After 20 minutes of resuscitation, he was pronounced dead from cardiac arrest.
- 2022:
  - 22 July: Austrian conductor Stefan Soltész, 73, collapsed while conducting a performance of Die schweigsame Frau at the Bavarian State Opera in Munich, and was pronounced dead at a local hospital.
  - 12 September: American drag performer Valencia Prime, 25, collapsed and died from heart disease while performing at a nightclub in Philadelphia.
  - 16 October: Haitian singer Michael Benjamin a.k.a. "Mikaben", 41, fell unconscious on Accor Arena's stage, right after he finished performing at a Carimi reunion show. He was pronounced dead a few minutes after.
  - 24 October: Radio presenter Tim Gough, 55, died at his home in Suffolk, UK, whilst presenting his breakfast show. Music suddenly stopped during the programme before starting again later.
- 2023:
  - 11 March: South African rapper Costa Titch, 28, collapsed and died while performing at the Ultra South Africa music festival in Johannesburg.
  - 26 May: Cuban-American musician Juan Carlos Formell (son of Juan Formell), 59, died from a heart attack during a concert in New York City.
  - 5 November: Juan Jumalon, known as DJ Johnny Walker, was shot during a live radio broadcast in the Philippines.
  - 19 November: Polina Menshikh, a Russian actress, was killed during a shelling of Russian soldiers in the village of Kumachove located in Donetsk Oblast in eastern Ukraine. A video shows Menshikh performing in a hall when the singing and lighting ended abruptly.
  - 13 December: Pedro Henrique, a Brazilian gospel singer, collapsed and died from a heart attack on stage whilst performing at a religious event in Feira de Santana, Bahia.
- 2024:
  - 13 January: Cajun accordionist Jo-El Sonnier died of a heart attack after a concert in Llano, Texas.
  - 13 July: Brazilian singer Ayres Sasaki, 35, died of electrocution from hugging a wet concertgoer while performing at a hotel in Salinópolis, Brazil.
  - 31 August: American rapper Fatman Scoop, 56, collapsed during a performance in Hamden, Connecticut, on 30 August. He was pronounced dead the following morning.
  - 24 November: Actor Julien Arnold died during a performance of A Christmas Carol at the Citadel Theatre in Edmonton, Alberta.
- 2025:
  - 13 January: Indian singer Rajib Sadiya died of heart attack during a performance in Tinsukia, Assam.
  - 31 March: Turkish folk singer Volkan Konak collapsed on stage during a concert in Famagusta, Cyprus, on 30 March. He died shortly afterwards.
  - 8 April: Dominican merengue singer Rubby Pérez was killed during a performance at the Jet Set nightclub in Santo Domingo along with at least a hundred spectators when the nightclub's roof collapsed.
  - 18 August: French streamer Jean Pormanove died in his sleep during a several-days-long livestream on Kick.
- 2026:
  - 12 June: 30-year-old Yemeni daredevil Al-qaqa Ibn Antar, known as "Spiderman of Yemen", fell 120 meters (393 feet) while attempting to scale the vertical rock faces of the Hardah Dam volcanic Crater in Damt city in the Al-Dhalea province, in front of spectators and cameras.
  - 18 July: 88-year-old Italian jazz drummer Gianni Cazzola died of a heart attack while performing at a concert in Busto Arsizio.

== See also ==
- List of television actors who died during production
- List of unusual deaths
- Sportspeople who died during their careers
- List of film and television accidents
