= Richard Versalle =

American opera singer

Richard Versalle in the title role of Tannhäuser, Bayreuth, 1985

Richard Lee Versalle (3 December 1932 – 5 January 1996) was an American operatic tenor.

== Life and career ==
Richard Versalle was born in Kalamazoo, Michigan on 3 December 1932. After serving in the submarine branch of the US Navy, he worked in business while studying singing. He was initially known as a concert and oratorio singer and did not make his operatic stage debut until the age of 45 when he sang Augustin Moser in Die Meistersinger von Nürnberg at Chicago Lyric Opera. He specialized in the heroic tenor roles such as the title role in Otello, Florestan in Fidelio, Tristan in Tristan und Isolde, and most notably the title role in Tannhäuser, which made him a sought after Tenor, who performed regularly at the Bayreuth Festspiele in 1985, 1986, 1987, and 1989, as well as in Genoa, Tokyo, Vienna, Bonn, Sydney, Pittsburg, Chicago, and the Met.

Versalle made his debut at the Metropolitan Opera on 8 December 1978, when he sang the minor role of the Messenger in Aida. Primarily performing in Europe, he became a well-known figure in the world wide Operatic community, having made his European debut in 1981 as Verdi's Otello at the Saarbrücken opera house. At Saarbrücken he also sang the title role in Peter Grimes and Siegmund in Die Walküre (1988). He returned to the Met in 1992 when he sang Tannhäuser. He was at the Met again in 1995 singing Jacob Schmidt in John Dexter's production of Rise and Fall of the City of Mahagonny.

On 5 January 1996, Versalle was singing the role of Vitek, a law clerk, at the Metropolitan Opera premiere of Janáček's The Makropulos Case, sung in English translation. Only a few minutes into the performance, after singing the line "You can only live so long" whilst halfway up a 20-foot (6-meter) ladder, he suffered a heart attack, and fell to the stage. The performance was halted; Joseph Volpe, the General Manager at the time had to pull the fire alarm to clear the audience, who believed this was part of the performance. Versalle was taken to St. Luke's-Roosevelt Hospital, where he was pronounced dead on arrival. His death was reported that same evening.

Versalle was married twice. His first marriage produced four children; Michael, Jeffrey, who preceded his father in death from AIDS in 1991, Jody, and Tim. He and his second wife, Alexis Darden, had a daughter, Tessa. His widow and his four remaining children survive him.

== Recordings ==
- Mahler: Symphony No.8 – London Philharmonic Orchestra and Choir, Klaus Tennstedt (conductor). Label: EMI CD
- Wagner: Tannhäuser – Bayreuth Festival Orchestra and Chorus, Giuseppe Sinopoli (conductor). Label: Euroarts DVD
- Wagner: Tristan und Isolde – Teatro Real Madrid Orchestra and Chorus, Peter Schneider (conductor). Label: Fiori CD

== See also ==
- List of entertainers who died during a performance

== Sources ==
- Davis, Peter G., "The Makropulos Curse", New York Magazine, 29 January 1996.
