= Joana Sainz García =

Spanish singer-songwriter and dancer (1989–2019)

Joana Sainz Garcia (1989 – September 1, 2019) was a Spanish singer, dancer, and songwriter from Madrid, Spain. She was killed in a stage explosion on September 1, 2019.

== Biography ==
Garcia was raised in Santander, a port city on Spain's north coast in the Cantabria region. She later moved to Suances, also in Cantabria. "The first time I saw her, when she came, I realized her virtues. She was a girl with a lot of energy, with a lot of desire. From the beginning, I saw her a dancer,” Garcia's teacher, Marta Rojo, told El Español. Rojo remembered that Garcia started formal dance training in 2010.

Sainz was the principal dancer and chief choreographer of Spain's Super Hollywood Orchestra. The group used many special effects in their performances, including fireworks.

Joana Sainz died on September 1, 2019, while performing in front of an audience of 1000 people, at a four-day music festival at Las Berlanas. A pyrotechnic device used during the performance exploded next to her. She was struck in the stomach by a faulty cartridge used in the pyrotechnic device.
