= List of television performers who died during production =

The following lists television performers who died during production of the television show in which they were appearing. In many cases, a show would kill off their character following an actor's death or otherwise writing them out of the show. In other cases, the show may recast the part with another actor. In extreme cases, the show may be cancelled outright.

== List ==
Actor	Character	Show	Number of appearances	Date of death	Cause of death	Season in production	Effect on production
Robert Ripley	Presenter and participant	Ripley's Believe It or Not	13	1949-05-27	Heart attack	1	Died three days after live broadcast of the 13th episode. Ripley's friends and associates filled in as presenters for the remainder of the first season. Robert St. John replaced Ripley as host for the second season. The series' final episode was on October 5, 1950, more than a year-and-a-half following Ripley's death.
Don "Creesh" Hornsby	Presenter and star performer	Broadway Open House	0	1950-05-22	Polio	1	Scheduled to be the show's host, but died a week before the May 29, 1950, premiere. Replaced by Morey Amsterdam (Mondays and Wednesdays) and Jerry Lester (Tuesdays, Thursdays and Fridays).
Richard Hart	Ellery Queen	The Adventures of Ellery Queen	11	1951-01-02	Heart attack	1	Character recast; replaced by Lee Bowman.
Barton Yarborough	Sgt. Ben Romero	Dragnet	1	1951-12-19	Heart attack	1	Romero was written out in the opening scene of the second episode of the series, shown in September 1952, with his character dying of the same cause as Yarborough. After a few episodes, the character of Romero was replaced by Frank Smith; played by Ben Alexander.
Hattie McDaniel	Beulah, the maid	Beulah	6	1952-10-26	Breast cancer	3	Character recast; replaced by Louise Beavers.
Nana Bryant	Julia, Margaret Williams's mother	Make Room for Daddy		1955-12-24	Unknown	3	No on-screen explanation given; the character was written out midway through the third season.
Fred Allen	Panelist	What's My Line?	92	1956-03-17	Heart attack	6	Died the day before filming a live episode he was scheduled to appear. Steve Allen took his place on the live broadcast the following day and subsequently by guest panelists.
Charles King	Various extras	Gunsmoke	28	1957-05-07	Cirrhosis of the liver	2	While an urban legend states that he died on the set after playing a corpse; the final episode he appeared in that aired during his lifetime was "Cheap Labor", which aired on May 4, 1957, days before his death. Seven additional episodes featuring King were aired between May 11 and July 6, 1957.
George Cleveland	George "Gramps" Miller	Lassie	116	1957-07-15	Heart attack	4	Character killed off.
Harry Green	Mose	ITV Television Playhouse	1	1958-05-31	Heart attack	3	Remainder of Poet's Corner – being broadcast live at the time of Green's backstage death – improvised to cover up his character's absence, such as another character receiving plot information by telephone from Green's character. Initial reports claimed that Green had died after, rather than during, the play.
Ward Bond	Major Seth Adams	Wagon Train	Approximately 130	1960-11-05	Heart attack	4	No on-screen explanation given; the character was written out midway through the fourth season and was replaced by John McIntire (Christopher Hale) as the "new wagon master."
Joseph Kearns	George Wilson	Dennis the Menace	100	1962-02-17	Cerebral hemorrhage	3	Character written out with season 3 episodes still in production, the first two episodes filmed after Kearns' death did not feature his character nor any acknowledgement of why he was absent; the episodes simply focus on other characters. Starting with the last six episodes of Season 3, the character of John Wilson (Gale Gordon as George's brother) is introduced and would remain for the rest of the series' run; the initial explanation of George's absence is that he was "away" on business. George (along with wife, Martha) is written out in the fourth-season premiere as having moved, and after a few scattered mentions in a few subsequent episodes, the characters were never seen or mentioned again afterwards.
Dick Powell	Host/Occasional star	The Dick Powell Show	41	1963-01-02	Lung cancer	2	Replaced by several other actors who served as guest hosts (at which point the series was renamed The Dick Powell Theatre), until the series was cancelled at the end of the season.
Larry Keating	Roger Addison	Mister Ed	81	1963-08-26	Leukemia	4	Character written out without explanation and replaced by Gordon Kirkwood, portrayed by Leon Ames.
John Larkin	Major General Wiley Crowe	Twelve O'Clock High	25	1965-01-29	Heart attack	1	Character written out without explanation.
Henry Kulky	Chief Curly Jones	Voyage to the Bottom of the Sea	22	1965-02-12	Heart attack	1	Character written out and replaced during the second season by Chief Sharkey, portrayed by Terry Becker.
Dorothy Kilgallen	Panelist	What's My Line?	784	1965-11-08	Combined drug and alcohol overdose	24	Died on the day following the live broadcast she had appeared on. Her place on the following week's live broadcast was taken by Kitty Carlisle, a panelist from To Tell the Truth (which, like What's My Line?, was produced by Goodson-Todman Productions) and subsequently by guest panelists.
Alice Pearce	Gladys Kravitz	Bewitched	60	1966-03-03	Ovarian cancer	2	Character recast, replaced by Sandra Gould starting with season 3. With season 2 production still continuing when Pearce died, an interim character, Harriet Kravitz (Mary Grace Canfield), Gladys' sister-in-law, is introduced, with the explanation that Gladys was visiting her mother, while Harriet visits with Abner to keep house.
Walt Disney	Himself/Host	Walt Disney's Wonderful World of Color		1966-12-15	Lung cancer	12	Hosting segments featuring Disney filmed before his death aired posthumously for the remainder of the season, with these segments removed starting with the following season.
Ann Sheridan	Henrietta Hanks	Pistols 'n' Petticoats	21	1967-01-21	Cancer	1	Character written out in the last five episodes. Afterwards, the series was canceled.
Smiley Burnette	Charley Pratt	Petticoat Junction		1967-02-16	Leukemia	4	Character written out without explanation, and replaced by Floyd Smoot (Rufe Davis) and later, Wendell Gibbs (Byron Foulger).
Charles Bickford	John Grainger	The Virginian	18	1967-11-09	Pneumonia and blood infection	6	Character either written out or killed off and replaced by his brother, Clay Grainger, portrayed by John McIntire.
Marion Lorne	Aunt Clara	Bewitched	27	1968-05-09	Heart attack	4	Character written out without explanation and replaced during the sixth season by Esmeralda, portrayed by Alice Ghostley.
Bea Benaderet	Kate Bradley	Petticoat Junction	163	1968-10-13	Lung cancer	5	No on-screen acknowledgement or direct comment on her death was ever made. The character of Kate Bradley is said to be "out of town". Kate's absence is alluded to have died in the season seven premiere episode when her daughters, Billie Jo and Bobbie Jo (Meredith MacRae and Lori Saunders) comment wistfully, "Mom taught us to swim in that very same water tower". Benaderet's character was replaced by Dr. Janet Craig, played by June Lockhart.
Barton MacLane	General Martin Peterson	I Dream of Jeannie	35	1969-01-01	Double pneumonia	4	Character written out without explanation and replaced during the fifth season by General Winfield Schaeffer, portrayed by Vinton Hayworth.
Robert Taylor	Host	Death Valley Days		1969-06-08	Lung cancer	17	Replaced by Dale Robertson.
Barbara Pepper	Doris Ziffel	Green Acres	30	1969-07-18	Coronary thrombosis	4	Character recast; role taken over by Fran Ryan.
Inger Stevens	Vanessa Smith	The Most Deadly Game	1	1970-04-30	acute barbiturate poisoning	1	Died more than five months before series premiere and her character was recast, with Yvette Mimieux taking the part. The premiere was postponed from September to October and ultimately the series was canceled after production of 13 episodes. The pilot episode with Stevens was never broadcast.
Frank Silvera	Don Sebastian Montoya	The High Chaparral	14	1970-06-11	Accidental electrocution	3	Character written out.
Arthur Leslie	Jack Walker	Coronation Street		1970-06-30	Heart attack		Character killed off with a heart attack.
Pete Duel	Hannibal Heyes (Joshua Smith)	Alias Smith and Jones	33	1971-12-31	Suicide by gunshot	2	Character recast with Roger Davis, the series' narrator.
Dan Blocker	Hoss Cartwright	Bonanza	400+	1972-05-13	Pulmonary embolism following surgery	13	Character written out with no on-screen explanation, although Hoss' death is alluded to in at least two episodes. David Canary reprised his role as Candy Canaday to replace Hoss; however, Blocker's death was partially cited as a reason for the series' ratings going into decline in the fall of 1972 and eventual cancellation.
Roger Delgado	The Master	Doctor Who	37	1973-06-18	Traffic collision	10	Planned final appearance for the character, The Final Game, cancelled. Character returned in 1976's The Deadly Assassin, having regenerated and now played by Peter Pratt.
James Beck	Private Joe Walker	Dad's Army	58	1973-08-06	Pancreatitis	6	Character written out during the episode "The Recruit" with a letter saying he was "gone to The Smoke". Character was never seen or mentioned again.
Glenn Strange	Sam	Gunsmoke	238	1973-09-20	Lung cancer	14	Character killed off.
Frank McGee	Co-host (with Barbara Walters)	The Today Show		1974-04-17	Pneumonia and multiple myeloma		Replaced by Jim Hartz.
Patricia Cutts	Blanche Hunt	Coronation Street	2	1974-09-06	Suicide by barbiturate poisoning		Character recast, replaced by Maggie Jones.
Paul Dixon	Presenter	Paul Dixon Show	Over 1000	1974-12-28	Aneurysm rupture	21	Series ended.
Larry Blyden	Host (intended)	Showoffs	0	1975-06-06	Injuries sustained in a car accident	1	Replaced by Bobby Van; a pilot episode with Blyden as the host was taped, but never broadcast.
Barbara Colby	Julie Erskine	Phyllis	3	1975-07-24	Gunshot wound, inflicted during drive-by shooting	1	Character recast with Liz Torres taking over the role.
Graham Haberfield	Jerry Booth	Coronation Street		1975-10-18	Heart failure		Character killed off with a heart attack.
Judith Lowry	Sally "Mother" Dexter	Phyllis	22	1976-11-29	Heart attack	2	Character written out without explanation; episodes Lowry completed prior to her death continued to air on schedule.
Freddie Prinze	Chico Rodriguez	Chico and the Man	62	1977-01-29	Suicide by gunshot	3	Episodes completed prior to Prinze's death were aired on schedule. The first aired episode after Prinze's death included an on-air acknowledgement from series creator and executive producer, James Komack. Following the airing of Prinze's last completed episode, for the rest of season three, Chico's absence is explained as being "away" (either on business or visiting his father), with completed scripts focusing on other characters and Chico's lines either removed or rewritten for other characters. Starting in season 4, Chico was replaced by a 12-year-old boy named Raul (Gabriel Melgar), while other characters initially continued to explain that Chico was away. Finally, in the season 4 episode, "Raul Runs Away," which aired January 20, 1978 (nearly one year after Prinze's death), it is explained that Chico had died but with no explanation of his cause of death. However, the ratings declined and, with Prinze's death a primary factor, the series was cancelled in the spring of 1978.
Diana Hyland	Joan Bradford	Eight is Enough	4	1977-03-27	Breast cancer	1	Character killed off before the beginning of the next season. Joan's death is addressed in the second-season premiere, and a new character, played by Betty Buckley, is introduced early in the second season.
Debbie Weems	Debbie, Phoebe, Baby Duck	Captain Kangaroo		1978-02-22	Fall from a building, possible suicide		Her characters were written out of the series.
Zara Cully	"Mother" Olivia Jefferson	The Jeffersons		1978-02-28	Lung cancer	4	Character killed off and addressed briefly in an early Season 5 episode.
Will Geer	"Grandpa" Zeb Walton	The Waltons		1978-04-22	Respiratory failure	6	Character killed off, with his death addressed in the seventh-season premiere.
Arthur Brough	Mr. Ernest Grainger	Are You Being Served?	34	1978-05-28		6	Character written out without explanation and replaced by Mr. Tebbs, portrayed by James Hayter.
Karl Swenson	Lars Hanson	Little House On the Prairie		1978-10-08	Heart attack	4	Character killed off, as having died from complications of a stroke he had suffered after the series' main setting, Walnut Grove (the town which he founded), had fallen into an economic depression. The final episode that featured his character aired eight days after his death.
Jack Soo	Detective Nick Yemana	Barney Miller		1979-01-11	Esophageal cancer	5	Character written out without explanation, though some episodes allude to Yemana's death. His last appearance was season 5 episode 9 "The Vandal". The fourteenth episode from fifth season The Voice Analyzer was aired on the same day Jack Soo died. A special tribute episode, with Soo's castmates giving out-of-character tributes to him, was aired in spring 1979.
Ted Cassidy	Voice of Incredible Hulk and The Narrator	The Incredible Hulk		1979-01-16	Complications from heart surgery	2	Character recast; replaced by Charles Napier.
Richard Beckinsale	Stan	Bloomers	5	1979-03-19	Coronary artery disease	1	Series cancelled, scheduled filming for a sixth episode was cancelled.
Bob Clayton	Announcer	The $20,000 Pyramid	1040	1979-11-01	Cardiac arrest	5	Replaced by Steve O'Brien.
Mary McCarty	Nurse Clara "Starch" Willoughby	Trapper John, M.D.	22	1980-03-30	Heart attack	1	Character written out, explained to have retired after getting married in the season 2 premiere; Character was replaced by Nurse Ernestine Shoop (played by Madge Sinclair).
Patrick Campbell, 3rd Baron Glenavy	Team captain	Call My Bluff		1980-11-10		15	Replaced by Arthur Marshall.
Jim Davis	Jock Ewing	Dallas	75	1981-04-26	Multiple myeloma	4	Character killed off with a helicopter crash after an extended absence.
Harold Bennett	Young Mr. Grace	Are You Being Served?	50	1981-09-11	Heart attack	9	Character written out, but continued to be mentioned. Later, character killed off in the first episode of the spinoff series Grace & Favour.
Johnny Jacobs	Announcer	Treasure Hunt	25	1982-02-08	Undisclosed	1	Replaced by Tony McClay, who had served as Jacobs' fill-in.
Michael Thoma	Greg Cranfield	Fame	7	1982-09-03	Cancer	1	His character was due to be fired but the pupils forced the school board to reconsider. His job was saved but Thoma died shortly after the episode was filmed. In the episode "Tough Act to Follow", the character was killed off with a heart attack; the episode was dedicated to Thoma.
Will Lee	Mr. Hooper	Sesame Street		1982-12-07	Heart attack	14	Character killed off, with his death addressed in the season 15 episode, "Goodbye, Mr. Hooper", aired on November 24, 1983, almost a year after his death. Episodes featuring Mr. Hooper that were taped prior to Lee's death were aired posthumously, with no acknowledgement of the reason for his absence from between his final aired appearance in early 1983, until the airing of that episode on Thanksgiving Day.
Frank Reynolds	Co-Anchor (with Peter Jennings and Max Robinson)	World News Tonight		1983-07-20	Hepatitis and Multiple myeloma		Reynolds' last broadcast was on April 20, 1983, it was initially expected that he would return to the program, but died before he could; program revamped with Jennings becoming the sole anchor.
Carolyn Jones	Myrna Clegg	Capitol	108	1983-08-03	Colon cancer	2	Temporary substitute Marla Adams played Myrna Clegg during periods when Jones was too ill to perform. At the time of Jones' death, Marla Adams was cast in The Young and the Restless and the role was assigned to Marj Dusay, who continued in the part for nearly four years, until Capitol's cancelation in March 1987.
Peter Dudley	Bert Tilsley	Coronation Street		1983-10-20	Heart attack		Character killed off with a heart attack.
Jessica Savitch	Host	Frontline	25	1983-10-23	Drowned in a car accident	1	Replaced during the second season by Judy Woodruff.
Michael Conrad	Phil Esterhaus	Hill Street Blues		1983-11-22	Urethral cancer	4	Character killed off while having sex with Grace Gardner. Episodes completed prior to his death were aired, with the first episode completed after Conrad's death addressing Esterhaus' death.
Ralph Wright	Eeyore	Welcome to Pooh Corner		1983-12-31	Heart attack	2	Character recast with Ron Gans taking over the role.
John Comer	Sid	Last of the Summer Wine	47	1984-02-11	Throat cancer	7	Character killed off, death mentioned on screen in following episodes.
Jack Howarth	Albert Tatlock	Coronation Street		1984-03-31	Liver complaint		Character killed off with a heart attack.
Jack Barry	Host	The Joker's Wild		1984-05-02	Cardiac arrest		Replaced by Bill Cullen.
Bernard Youens	Stan Ogden	Coronation Street		1984-08-27	Gangrene		Character killed off with gangrene.
Ève Gagnier	Cannelle	Passe-Partout	125	1984-09-19	Kidney Complications	2	Character recast; replaced by Lucie Beauvais.
Toke Townley	Sam Pearson	Emmerdale		1984-09-27	Heart attack		Character killed off in his sleep.
Charlotte Long	Eloise	The Tripods		1984-10-06	Car crash	1	Character written out but was briefly recast, with Cindy Shelley appearing as Eloise during a dream sequence in an episode.
Jon-Erik Hexum	Mac Harper	Cover Up	7	1984-10-18	Gunshot wound to the head, accidentally self-inflicted with a blank cartridge	1	Character killed off and replaced by Jack Striker, portrayed by Antony Hamilton.
Lennard Pearce	Grandad	Only Fools & Horses	26	1984-12-15	Heart attack	4	Character killed off. Pearce died while filming the series four episode "Hole in One" (several scenes were subsequently reshot with Buster Merryfield).
Carol Wayne	Matinee Lady (in Art Fern's Tea Time Movie sketches)	The Tonight Show Starring Johnny Carson		1985-01-13	Drowned		Replaced by Teresa Ganzel.
Nicholas Colasanto	Coach Ernie Pantusso	Cheers	71	1985-02-12	Heart disease	3	Character killed off at the beginning of the next season and replaced as bartender by Woody Boyd, portrayed by Woody Harrelson.
Dolph Sweet	Chief Carl Kanisky	Gimme a Break!	88	1985-05-08	Stomach cancer	4	Character killed off, and his character's death was addressed in the fifth-season premiere.
Selma Diamond	Selma Hacker	Night Court		1985-05-13	Lung cancer	2	Character killed off and addressed in the third-season premiere.
Samantha Smith	Elizabeth Culver	Lime Street	4	1985-08-25	Crash of Bar Harbor Airlines Flight 1808	1	Production initially continued, but series cancelled after airing only five out of eight episodes produced.
Sidney Clute	Detective Paul LaGuardia	Cagney & Lacey	80	1985-10-02	Cancer	4	Character written off, with an onscreen explanation that he retired and moved away. As a tribute, Clute's name was kept in the opening credits for the remainder of the series.
Johnny Olson	Announcer	The Price Is Right		1985-10-12	cerebral hemorrhage	13	Replaced in February 1986 by Rod Roddy (on-air auditions were held in the interim).
Bill Scott	Moosel, Brat	The Wuzzles	13	1985-11-29	Heart attack	1	Series cancelled.
Bill Scott	Gruffi Gummi, Toadwart, Sir Tuxford	Disney's Adventures of the Gummi Bears	13	1985-11-29	Heart attack	1	Characters recast for the second season; Corey Burton voiced Gruffi Gummi and Toadwart while Roger C. Carmel voiced Sir Tuxford (before his own death the following year).
Anne Baxter	Victoria Cabot	Hotel		1985-12-12	Stroke	3	Character killed off.
Dustin Gee	Himself (performer)	The Laughter Show	12	1986-01-03	Heart attack	3	N/A
Florence Halop	Florence Kleiner	Night Court		1986-07-15	Lung cancer	3	Character killed off and addressed in the fourth-season premiere. Her successor was played by Marsha Warfield, who remained for the rest of the series run.
Ted Knight	Henry Rush	The Ted Knight Show	129	1986-08-26	Colorectal cancer	6	Series cancelled; production was set to resume in September 1986, with Knight planning to return to work. First-run episodes that were completed prior to his death were aired on schedule through the end of the 1986–1987 season.
Roger C. Carmel	Cyclonus, Bruticus, Motormaster	The Transformers		1986-11-11	Congestive heart failure	3	Bruticus and Motormaster both written out. Replaced as voice of Cyclonus during the fourth season by Jack Angel.
Roger C. Carmel	Sir Tuxford	Disney's Adventures of the Gummi Bears		1986-11-11	Congestive heart failure	2	Character recast with Brian Cummings.
James Coco	Nick Milano	Who's the Boss?	3	1987-02-25	Heart attack	3	Character killed off, with his death addressed in a fourth season episode.
Joe Gladwin	Wally Batty	Last of the Summer Wine	45	1987-03-11		9	Character killed off, death mentioned on screen in following episodes.
Eamonn Andrews	Host	This Is Your Life		1987-11-05	Heart failure		Andrews had completed his last edition of the show six days before his death on October 30. This and two others that had yet to be broadcast, were postponed until they were broadcast in January 1988, with his widow's permission. Replaced by Michael Aspel.
Grigory Tolchinsky	Filya	Good Night, Little Ones!	1000+	1988-03-05	Natural causes	24	Character recast, replaced by Igor Galunenko.
Daws Butler	Various characters (most notably Yogi Bear and Huckleberry Hound)	Yogi's Treasure Hunt	27	1988-05-18	Heart attack	3	Series ended two months before Butler's death; replaced by sequel series The New Yogi Bear Show with the title character voiced by Greg Burson.
Jack Clark	Announcer	Wheel of Fortune		1988-07-21	Bone cancer	8	Replaced by M.G. Kelly, and later by Charlie O'Donnell.
Jack Haig	Monsieur Roger LeClerc	'Allo 'Allo!	51	1989-07-04	Cancer	5	Character written out as to have returned to prison (where he came from at the start of the show) because he liked the food better there than at René's Café. Replaced by his brother Ernest LeClerc, portrayed by Derek Royle.
Derek Royle	Monsieur Ernest LeClerc	'Allo 'Allo!	8	1990-01-23	Cancer	6	Character recast, role taken over by Robin Parkinson.
David Rappaport	MAL	Captain Planet and the Planeteers	4	1990-05-02	Suicide by gunshot	1	Character recast; replaced by Tim Curry.
Jim Henson	various Muppets, most notably Ernie and Kermit the Frog	Sesame Street		1990-05-16	Streptococcal toxic shock syndrome	21	Season ended five days before his death. Henson's final day performing Ernie and Kermit on the show was on November 21, 1989, where he taped three musical segments. In the following seasons, some characters recast with other Muppet performers, most notably Steve Whitmire, who assumed the roles of Ernie and Kermit. A number of other characters, however, were written out outside of special occasions.
Kevin Peter Hall	Harry	Harry and the Hendersons	16	1991-04-10	AIDS-related pneumonia	1	Character recast with Dawan Scott taking over the role.
Emily McLaughlin	Jessie Brewer	General Hospital		1991-04-26	Cancer		Character killed off.
Arthur Pentelow	Henry Wilks	Emmerdale		1991-08-06	Heart attack		Character killed off with a heart attack.
Redd Foxx	Alphonso Royal	The Royal Family	7	1991-10-11	Heart attack	1	Character killed off. The show was retooled with Jackee Harry being introduced as Al and Victoria's other daughter, who moved in with the Royals to help them overcome Al's death. Despite this move being well-received, the show was cancelled after one season.
Richard Hunt	Various Muppets	Sesame Street		1992-01-07	AIDS complications	23	Some episodes already taped during fall months prior to his death were aired posthumously, with his characters written out of the show the following season and some of them recast by other Muppet performers, most notably David Rudman and Jennifer Barnhart.
Larry Riley	Frank Williams	Knots Landing	111	1992-06-06	AIDS-related kidney failure	13	Character written out; No on-screen explanation given.
John Hancock	Ike Johnson	Love & War	7	1992-10-12	Heart attack	1	Character killed off and replaced by his brother Abe, portrayed by Charlie Robinson.
Werner Stocker	Darius	Highlander: The Series	5	1993-05-27	Brain cancer	1	Character killed off in the season finale; was originally planned to appear in flashbacks in subsequent episodes, but had to be completely written out instead.
James Hunt	Color commentator	Grand Prix		1993-06-15	Heart attack		Replaced by Jonathan Palmer.
Raymond Burr	Perry Mason	Perry Mason	26	1993-09-12	Cancer		Character written out as being out of town in the final four films (which were retitled A Perry Mason Mystery) and was replaced first by Paul Sorvino as Anthony Caruso, then by Hal Holbrook as Wild Bill McKenzie in the other three.
Raúl "Chato" Padilla	Various characters (most notably Jaimito, el cartero and Licenciado Morales)	Chespirito	600+	1994-02-03	Diabetes	15	Series ended.
MacDonald Carey	Tom Horton	Days of Our Lives	2,955	1994-03-21	Lung cancer		Character killed off.
Mark McManus	Jim Taggart	Taggart	31	1994-06-06	Alcohol induced liver failure	11	Character disappears and is subsequently killed off.
Dominic Lucero	Himself/Various characters	Roundhouse	52	1994-07-01	Lymphoma	3	His characters were recast by other cast members or written out without explanation, Lucero was paid tribute in the series finale.
Robert Lansing	Captain Paul Blaisdell	Kung Fu: The Legend Continues	24	1994-10-23	Cancer	2	Character written out; No on-screen explanation given.
Hugh O'Connor	Lonnie Jamison	In the Heat of the Night		1995-04-07	Suicide by gunshot	8	Final television movie, which had already completed production, was dedicated to O'Connor when it aired about a month after his death.
Kōhei Miyauchi	Kame Sennin	Dragon Ball Z		1995-06-02	abdominal varices		Miyauchi recorded dialogue for the role three months before his death. Character recast; replaced by Jōji Yanami for a single episode then Hiroshi Masuoka thereafter in Dragon Ball GT.
Kei Tomiyama	Yang Wen Li	Legend of the Galactic Heroes	72	1995-09-25	pancreatic cancer	3	Character killed off but Tomiyama had already completed his lines before his death; replaced by Hozumi Gōda for spin-off series.
Kei Tomiyama	Tomozou Sakura	Chibi Maruko-chan		1995-09-25	pancreatic cancer	2	Character recast, taken over by Takeshi Aono.
Linda Gary	Aunt May	Spider-Man	28	1995-10-05	Brain cancer	3	Character recast for the fourth season; taken over by Julie Bennett.
Doris Grau	Lunchlady Doris	The Simpsons	21	1995-12-30	Respiratory failure	7	Character initially written out, but reappears in later seasons with character recast by Tress MacNeille.
John Beradino	Steve Hardy	General Hospital		1996-05-19	Pancreatic cancer		Character killed off.
Ray Combs	Host	Family Challenge		1996-06-02	Suicide by hanging	2	Replaced by Michael Burger, rebranded as "The New Family Challenge".
Dana Hill	Charles Duckman	Duckman	49	1996-07-15	Complications caused by diabetes	4	Character recast; replaced by Pat Musick.
Victor Aaron	John Redcorn	King of the Hill	2	1996-09-04	Car accident	1	Character recast; replaced during the second season by Jonathan Joss.
Robert Ridgely	Commander	Dexter's Laboratory	3	1997-02-08	Cancer	1	Character recast; replaced by Earl Boen.
David Doyle	Grandpa Lou Pickles	Rugrats		1997-02-26	Heart attack	5	Character recast; replaced by Joe Alaskey.
Iain Anders	Superintendent Jack McVitie	Taggart	39	1997-09-05	Infection following a short illness	14	Character written out; No on-screen explanation given.
Dermot Morgan	Father Ted Crilly	Father Ted		1998-02-28	Heart attack	3	Production completed filming before his death.
Gera Sufimova	Karkusha	Good Night, Little Ones!	1000+	1998-04-15	Natural causes	34	Character recast, replaced by Galina Marchenko.
Kevin Lloyd	DC Alfred "Tosh" Lines	The Bill		1998-05-02	Asphyxia	14	Character written out; No on-screen explanation given.
Phil Hartman	Bill McNeal	NewsRadio	75	1998-05-28	Murdered by his wife, Brynn Hartman	5	Character killed off with a heart attack at the beginning of the season in a tribute episode. Replaced for the fifth season by Jon Lovitz as Max Louis.
Phil Hartman	Troy McClure and Lionel Hutz	The Simpsons	54	1998-05-28	Murdered by his wife, Brynn Hartman	10	Characters written out, occasionally being used in background shots.
Shari Lewis	Herself, Lamb Chop, Charlie Horse, Hush Puppy, and Lewis	The Charlie Horse Music Pizza	23	1998-08-02	Pneumonia	2	Series cancelled.
Phil Leeds	Judge Dennis "Happy" Boyle	Ally McBeal	5	1998-08-16	Pneumonia	2	Character killed off.
Bob Trow	Bob Dog, Robert Troll, and Harriet Elizabeth Cow	Mister Rogers' Neighborhood		1998-11-02	Heart attack	29	Characters written out.
Michelle Thomas	Callie Rogers	The Young and the Restless	38	1998-12-23	Desmoplastic tumor	26	Character recast, replaced by Siena Goines.
Gene Siskel	Host	Siskel & Ebert		1999-02-20	Complications from brain surgery		Show renamed to Roger Ebert & the Movies, with Ebert accompanied by guest critics; Richard Roeper later joined Ebert as permanent co-host.
David Strickland	Todd Stities	Suddenly Susan		1999-03-22	Suicide by hanging	3	Character written out, the season three finale features his character missing but ended without explanation of the character's fate, nor was mentioned during season four, although an off-screen death was hinted.
Jill Dando	Presenter	Crimewatch		1999-04-26	Murdered		Replaced by Fiona Bruce.
Buster Merryfield	Uncle Albert	Only Fools & Horses		1999-06-23	Brain tumour	7	Character killed off.
Bill Owen	Compo Simmonite	Last of the Summer Wine	186	1999-07-12	Pancreatic cancer	21	Character killed off with a heart attack and addressed in a season 22 episode. Bill Owen's son Tom Owen plays character's on screen son Tom Simmonite in following episodes.
Mary Kay Bergman	Various characters (including Liane Cartman and Sheila Broflovski)	South Park	44	1999-11-11	Suicide by gunshot	3	Characters recast, taken over by Mona Marshall, Eliza Schneider, and later April Stewart.
Mary Kay Bergman	Jay Jay, Herky, Savannah, Revvin' Evan	Jay Jay the Jet Plane	38	1999-11-11	Suicide by gunshot	2	Characters recast; replaced by Debi Derryberry.
Mary Kay Bergman	Timmy Turner	Oh Yeah! Cartoons		1999-11-11	Suicide by gunshot	2	Character recast with Tara Strong taking over the role.
Madeline Kahn	Pauline Fox	Cosby	83	1999-12-03	Ovarian cancer	4	Character written out without explanation. A special tribute episode, with Kahn's castmates giving out-of-character tributes to her, was aired a few weeks after her death.
Madeline Kahn	Mrs. Shapiro	Little Bill	1	1999-12-03	Ovarian cancer	1	Character recast; replaced by Kathy Najimy.
Nancy Marchand	Livia Soprano	The Sopranos		2000-06-18	Lung cancer and emphysema	3	Character killed off.
Myles Ferguson	Scott Linton	Edgemont	13	2000-09-29	Car accident	1	Character written out without explanation.
David Dukes	Joseph McPhee	Dawson's Creek	7	2000-10-09	Heart attack	4	Character written out.
Michael Cuccione	Jason "Q.T." McKnight	2gether: The Series	19	2001-01-13	Respiratory failure	2	Series cancelled.
Kenneth MacDonald	Mike	Only Fools and Horses	30	2001-08-07	Heart attack	9	Character written out with the explanation of being in prison for fraud.
Kathleen Freeman	Mrs. Gordon	As Told by Ginger		2001-08-23	Lung cancer	2	Character written out as having retired. Original ending of episode "No Hope For Courtney" was to have Mrs. Gordon return to work as a teacher.
Ginzō Matsuo	Alexander T. Oyajiide	Ojamajo Doremi		2001-08-25	Acute subarachnoid hemorrhage	3	Character recast for season 4 by Nobuaki Kanemitsu.
Graeme Strachan	Host/Carpenter	Our House		2001-08-29	Helicopter crash	9	A tribute episode to Shirl was aired several weeks after his death, series later cancelled.
Billie Lou Watt	Ma Bagge	Courage the Cowardly Dog	6	2001-09-07	Lung cancer	3	Character written out.
Natalia Derzhavina	Khryusha	Good Night, Little Ones!	1000+	2002-03-10	Heart Failure	38	Character recast, replaced by Natalia Golubentseva, then Oksana Chabanyuk.
Gordon Wharmby	Wesley Pegden	Last of the Summer Wine	139	2002-05-18	Lung cancer	23	Character killed off, death mentioned in following episodes.
Josh Ryan Evans	Timmy Lenox	Passions	302	2002-08-05	Complications of heart surgery	4	Character killed off in the episode that aired the day of his death. The character was originally planned to reappear as an angel in later episodes, but had to be written out instead.
Yō Inoue	Ryo Bakura	Yu-Gi-Oh! Duel Monsters		2003-02-28	lung cancer		Character recast; replaced by Rica Matsumoto.
Lynne Thigpen	Ella Mae Farmer	The District		2003-03-12	Cerebral hemorrhage	3	Character killed off from the cancer she was in remission from. Third season finale included a tribute to her character.
Lynne Thigpen	Luna the Moon	Bear in the Big Blue House		2003-03-12	Cerebral hemorrhage	4	Production ended one year before her death, with the last remaining episodes airing posthumously in 2006, after three years of hiatus, replaced with spin-off Breakfast with Bear in 2005.
Thora Hird	Edie Pegden	Last of the Summer Wine	152	2003-03-15	Stroke	24	Character killed off, death implied on screen in following episodes.
Michael Jeter	Mr. Noodle's Brother, Mister Noodle	Sesame Street	23 (Elmo's World)	2003-03-30	Epileptic seizure	34	Character written out at the end while the original Mr. Noodle (Bill Irwin) remained. The Elmo's World episodes featuring Mr. Noodle's brother that were completed before Jeter's death, "Ears" and "Wild Animals", originally aired as part of the new episodes of the season in the days and weeks after his death. The season 35 premiere, which is a special entitled "The Street We Live On", aired in 2004 and was dedicated in the memory of Jeter, a year after his death.
Gregory Hines	William "Big Bill" Glover	Little Bill		2003-08-09	Liver cancer	4	Series ended.
Harry Goz	Captain Hazel "Hank" Murphy	Sealab 2021		2003-09-06	Multiple myeloma	3	Character written out as having left Sealab to fight in "The Great Spice Wars". Replaced by his son Michael as Captain Bellerophon "Tornado" Shanks.
Jaclyn Linetsky	Caillou	Caillou		2003-09-08	Traffic accident		Character recast; replaced by Annie Bovaird.
Jaclyn Linetsky	Lori	What's with Andy?	26	2003-09-08	Traffic accident	2	Character recast; replaced by Eleanor Noble.
Jaclyn Linetsky	Megan O'Connor	15/Love	13	2003-09-08	Traffic accident	1	Both characters killed off in a plane crash.
Vadim Schneider	Sébastien Dubé	15/Love	13	2003-09-08	Traffic accident	1	Both characters killed off in a plane crash.
John Ritter	Paul Hennessy	8 Simple Rules		2003-09-11	Undiagnosed aortic dissection	2	Character killed off from an implied heart attack, with his character's death explained in the two-part episode "Goodbye". The first three episodes of the second season completed before Ritter's death were aired weeks later with an introduction by Katey Sagal. Two new characters, portrayed by James Garner and David Spade, were introduced to replace Ritter's character.
John Ritter	Clifford	Clifford the Big Red Dog	65	2003-09-11	Undiagnosed aortic dissection	3	Series ended five months before Ritter's death; replaced by prequel Clifford's Puppy Days, which debuted ten days before Ritter's death, with the title character voiced by Lara Jill Miller. Later, character recast by Adam Sanders on the 2019 revival series.
John Ritter	Sam Dorian	Scrubs	2	2003-09-11	Undiagnosed aortic dissection	3	Character killed off in the episode "My Cake", which was a tribute towards Ritter.
Tony Capstick	Policeman	Last of the Summer Wine	33	2003-10-23	Aneurysm following pneumonia	25	Character written out; No on-screen explanation given, and replaced by another policeman, portrayed by Louis Emerick.
Rod Roddy	Announcer	The Price Is Right		2003-10-27	Colon cancer	32	Replaced in April 2004 by Rich Fields (on-air auditions were held in the interim).
Robert F. Colesberry	Detective Ray Cole	The Wire	12	2004-02-09	Complications from cardiac surgery	3	Character killed off in the third season episode "Dead Soldiers".
Richard Biggs	Milo Morton	Strong Medicine		2004-05-22	Aortic dissection	5	Character killed off.
Richard Biggs	FBI Agent	Drake & Josh	1	2004-05-22	Aortic dissection	2	Biggs completed filming the episode he appeared on, "The Gary Grill", before his death, which aired posthumously and was dedicated to him.
Christopher Reeve	Dr. Virgil Swann	Smallville	4	2004-10-10	Heart failure	4	Character killed off in the fourth season episode "Sacred".
David Bailey	Alistair Crane	Passions		2004-11-25	Drowned in his pool	6	Character recast, replaced by John Reilly.
Jerry Orbach	Lennie Briscoe	Law & Order: Trial by Jury	2 (Trial by Jury); 282 (all Law & Order programs)	2004-12-28	Prostate cancer	1	Character killed off; character's off-screen death mentioned on other shows within the Law & Order franchise.
John Vernon	Dean Toadblatt	The Grim Adventures of Billy & Mandy	3	2005-02-01	Complications from heart surgery	5	Character recast; replaced by Ronnie Schell.
Stan Richards	Seth Armstrong	Emmerdale		2005-02-11	Emphysema		Character killed off with a heart attack while flying home from Australia.
Frank Gorshin	Hugo Strange	The Batman	3	2005-05-17	Lung cancer	3	Character recast, replaced by Richard Green.
Richard Whiteley	Host	Countdown		2005-06-26	endocarditis		Replaced by Des Lynam.
Peter Jennings	Anchor	World News Tonight with Peter Jennings		2005-08-07	Lung cancer		Replaced by Bob Woodruff and Elizabeth Vargas in January 2006, and by Charles Gibson later in the year.
Pat Morita	Master Udon	SpongeBob SquarePants	1	2005-11-24	Kidney failure	4	Morita recorded dialogue for the episode "Karate Island" before his death and his character's screams and grunts performed by Tom Kenny; the episode was dedicated to him.
John Spencer	Leo McGarry	The West Wing	155	2005-12-16	Heart attack	7	Character killed off with a heart attack; running mate Matt Santos (portrayed by Jimmy Smits) wins presidential election.
Vernon Roberts	Papa Nichols	Drake & Josh	1	2005-12-25	Heart Attack	3	Roberts completed filming the episode he appeared on before his death, which aired posthumously.
Len Carlson	Buzz	Cyberchase		2006-01-26	Heart Attack	5	Character recast, replaced by Philip Williams.
Len Carlson	Minimus P.U., Greenbeard and Spindly Tam Kanushu	Atomic Betty		2006-01-26	Heart Attack	2	Character recast, replaced by Dwayne Hill.
Len Carlson	Narrator	Friends and Heroes	13	2006-01-26	Heart Attack	1	Replaced by Adam James.
Benjamin Hendrickson	Harold "Hal" Munson Jr.	As the World Turns		2006-07-02	Suicide by gunshot		Character killed off on the line of duty.
Mako Iwamatsu	Iroh	Avatar: The Last Airbender	31	2006-07-21	Esophageal cancer	2	Completed voice work for the second season prior to his death. Character had a non-speaking appearance in the beginning of the next season and was then recast with Greg Baldwin, who accurately imitated Mako's voice and voiced the character for the third and final season, along with two guest appearances in season two of the sequel series The Legend of Korra.
Tony Jay	Spiderus, Cloud King	Miss Spider's Sunny Patch Friends	17	2006-08-13	Complications from cancer surgery	3	Series ended.
Steve Irwin	Himself/Crocodile Hunter	The Crocodile Hunter	64	2006-09-04	Stingray injury	5	Series cancelled. In 2018, the remaining family members starred in the series, Crikey! It's the Irwins, following their work at the Australia Zoo.
Bo Schembechler	Himself	Big Ten Ticket	77	2006-11-17	Heart attack		Died of a heart attack at the studios of WXYZ-TV in Southfield, Michigan, while preparing for weekly interview segment on the program. The episode was to air the next day, prior to a Michigan–Ohio State game, but was never produced due to his death. Series resumed in the 2007 college football season and continued for several years with numerous reporters replacing Schembechler.
Darlene Conley	Sally Spectra	The Bold and the Beautiful		2007-01-14	Stomach cancer		Character written out in the South of France, "surrounded by hunky cabana boys".
Howard Attfield	Geoff Noble	Doctor Who	1	2007-10-31	Cancer	4	Attfield's filmed scenes as Donna Noble's father were refilmed with Bernard Cribbins playing the (previously unconnected) character Wilfred Mott, now Donna's grandfather. Character's off-screen death mentioned in the series.
Nina Foch	Victoria Mallard	NCIS	3	2008-01-24	Natural causes	5	Character killed off in season 7.
Christopher Allport	Andrew Campbell	Mad Men		2008-01-25	Avalanche	1	Character killed off with a plane crash.
Ashley Callie	Lee Haines	Isidingo	500+	2008-02-15	Traffic Accident	11	Character went missing and later killed off-screen without specifying her cause of death.
Mark Speight	Presenter	SMart	173	2008-04-07	Suicide by hanging	14	A special tribute to Speight was broadcast. Along with the final two series' new format, guest presenters appear each week to assist the two presenters, Kirsten O'Brien and Mike Fischetti.
Stanley Kamel	Dr. Charles Kroger	Monk	46	2008-04-08	Heart attack		Character killed off with a heart attack and replaced as Adrian Monk's psychiatrist by Dr. Neven Bell, portrayed by Héctor Elizondo.
Tim Russert	Moderator	Meet the Press		2008-06-13	Heart attack		Replaced by Tom Brokaw, and later by David Gregory.
Clive Hornby	Jack Sugden	Emmerdale		2008-07-03	Cancer		Character killed off with a heart attack.
Kathy Staff	Nora Batty	Last of the Summer Wine	246	2008-12-13	Brain tumor	29	Character written out as visiting Australia, and replaced by Barbara Young as her sister, Stella, who is house-sitting for her.
Wayne Allwine	Mickey Mouse	Mickey Mouse Clubhouse	99	2009-05-18	Complications caused by diabetes	3	Character recast for season 4; replaced by Bret Iwan as the current voice of Mickey Mouse.
Billy Mays	Himself (host)	PitchMen	12	2009-06-28	Hypertensive heart disease	1	Series continued with Anthony Sullivan becoming the sole host.
Maggie Jones	Blanche Hunt	Coronation Street		2009-12-02	Undisclosed		Character killed off.
Brittany Murphy	Luanne Platter and various characters	King of the Hill		2009-12-20	Pneumonia	13	The original series ended three months before Murphy's death, with six unaired episodes broadcast six months after her death. Character written out without explanation (alongside Tom Petty, who played Lucky in the original series and died in 2017) in the fourteenth/revival season.
Phil Harris	Himself	Deadliest Catch		2010-02-09	Intracranial hemorrhage	6	Replaced by Derrick Ray as captain for the remainder of the season.
Charlie O'Donnell	Announcer	Wheel of Fortune		2010-11-01	Heart failure	22	Replaced in June 2011 by Jim Thornton (on-air auditions were held in the interim).
Elisabeth Sladen	Sarah Jane Smith	The Sarah Jane Adventures	53	2011-04-19	Cancer	5	Production suspended before the commencement of filming of three planned two-part serials, resulting in an abbreviated broadcast season and leaving some story arcs and plot points unresolved. Series later ended.
Ryan Dunn	Himself (host)	Proving Ground	9	2011-06-20	Car crash	1	Series cancelled.
Andy Whitfield	Spartacus	Spartacus: Blood and Sand		2011-09-11	Non-Hodgkin lymphoma	4	Character recast with Liam McIntyre taking over the role.
Frances Bay	Aunt Ginny	The Middle	11	2011-09-15	Complications from pneumonia	3	Character killed off in Season 3 episode, "The Map".
Betty Driver	Betty Williams	Coronation Street	2,800+	2011-10-15	Pneumonia		Character killed off with an illness.
Evin Esen	Şaziment Özkaya (Şaziment Kaynana)	Akasya Durağı	150	2012-01-18	Intracranial hemorrhage	4	Character absent in episodes 151 and 152, then character recast, replaced by Bilge Şen in episode 153.
Ian Abercrombie	Chancellor Palpatine/Darth Sidious	Star Wars: The Clone Wars	29	2012-01-26	Kidney Failure	5	Character recast; replaced by Tim Curry.
Ian Abercrombie	Ganthet	Green Lantern: The Animated Series	5	2012-01-26	Kidney Failure	1	Series ended.
Ernest Borgnine	Mermaid Man	SpongeBob SquarePants	15	2012-07-08	Kidney failure	8	Character written out (alongside Barnacle Boy).
Jerry Nelson	The Count and other characters	Sesame Street		2012-08-23	Chronic obstructive pulmonary disease	44	Many of Nelson's characters recast; replaced by Matt Vogel. An episode loosely inspired by Nelson's death and centered on The Count aired in 2013.
Larry Hagman	J.R. Ewing	Dallas	356 (original series); 17 (revival series)	2012-11-23	Acute myeloid leukemia	2	Character killed off with two fatal gunshot wounds (a reference to the "Who shot J.R.?" cliffhanger of the original series), an episode revolving around his funeral, and an episode detailing his master plan.
Jenni Rivera	Herself	I Love Jenni		2012-12-09	Crash of Mexico Learjet 25	3	Series ended; In 2016, the remaining family members starred in the spin-off series The Riveras, which featured her daughter Chiquis Rivera.
Richard Collins	Philadelphia "Phil" Collins	Trailer Park Boys	13 (excluding films and specials)	2013-04-15	Heart attack	7	Character written out without explanation. Collins died between the series' original cancellation in 2007 and its revival in 2014; his final appearance as the character was in the 2014 feature film Trailer Park Boys: Don't Legalize It, which was dedicated to his memory.
Jeanne Cooper	Katherine Chancellor	The Young and the Restless	1,296	2013-05-08	Chronic obstructive pulmonary disease	40	Character killed off in her sleep. A tribute episode was later made in honor of Cooper.
Richard Thorp	Alan Turner	Emmerdale	2100+	2013-05-22			Character killed off in his sleep.
James Gandolfini	John Stone	The Night Of	0	2013-06-19	Heart attack	1	Gandolfini was set to portray the role of John Stone. However, he died before filming began. Production delayed, character recast; replaced by John Turturro. Gandolfini was posthumously credited as executive producer. The first episode, "The Beach", which aired three years after his death was dedicated to him.
Cory Monteith	Finn Hudson	Glee	81	2013-07-13	Drug and alcohol overdose	5	Production delayed; character killed off in the season 5 episode, "The Quarterback", without specifying cause of death and it was made in tribute to Monteith.
Lee Thompson Young	Barold "Barry" Frost	Rizzoli & Isles	56	2013-08-19	Suicide by gunshot	4	Production suspended; character was said to be on vacation at the end of the fourth season, then later killed off in a car accident on the way home; his funeral was held in the second episode of the fifth season.
Marcia Wallace	Edna Krabappel	The Simpsons	178	2013-10-25	Pneumonia	25	Character originally written out, later killed off screen. Edna's death (which includes previously recorded dialogue by Wallace) is acknowledged in the season 25 episode "The Man Who Grew Too Much."
Christopher Evan Welch	Peter Gregory	Silicon Valley	5	2013-12-02	Cancer	1	Character killed off screen while taking a trip in Serengeti after suffering an implied heart attack while running away from a tent incident.
Philip Seymour Hoffman	Thom Payne	Happyish	0	2014-02-02	Acute combined drug intoxication	1	Hoffman was originally set to play the role of Thom Payne, but died after filming began. Character recast; replaced by Steve Coogan.
Ralph Waite	Jackson Gibbs	NCIS	8	2014-02-13	Natural causes	11	Character killed off with a stroke in Season 11 finale episode, "Honor Thy Father". Later, character recast by Robert Taylor in the prequel series, NCIS: Origins, in 2024.
James Rebhorn	Frank Mathison	Homeland	8	2014-03-21	Melanoma	4	Character killed off with a stroke while Carrie is working overseas, the season 4 finale was dedicated to him.
Walter Massey	Principal Haney	Arthur		2014-08-04	Undisclosed	19	Character written out as having moved to Tanzania to build a school.
J. J. Murphy	Denys Mallister	Game of Thrones	1	2014-08-08	Natural causes	5	Character written out.
Don Pardo	Announcer	Saturday Night Live	726	2014-08-18	Natural causes	38	Replaced by former SNL cast member Darrell Hammond.
Joan Rivers	Host	Fashion Police		2014-09-04	Anoxic encephalopathy due to hypoxic arrest	5	Replaced by Kathy Griffin, and later by NeNe Leakes and Margaret Cho.
Joan Rivers	Bubbe	Arthur	2	2014-09-04	Anoxic encephalopathy due to hypoxic arrest	19	Character killed off in the season 25 episode "Listen Up".
Elizabeth Peña	Maritza Sandouai	Matador	7	2014-10-14	Cirrhosis	1	Series cancelled.
Carol Ann Susi	Debbie Wolowitz	The Big Bang Theory	39	2014-11-11	Cancer	8	Character killed off in her sleep while on vacation in Florida.
Warren Clarke	Charles Poldark	Poldark	4	2014-11-12	Died in his sleep following a short illness	1	Character killed off in his sleep while on his deathbed in Season 1, Episode 4.
Edward Herrmann	Richard Gilmore	Gilmore Girls: A Year in the Life	86 (original series)	2014-12-31	Brain Cancer	1	Died before production of miniseries began. Character killed off with a heart attack.
Lam Pou-chuen	Doraemon (Cantonese dub)	Doraemon	320 + 1215 (1979 series)	2015-01-02	Myocardial infarction		Character recast, replaced by Wong Yan-yu.
Anne Kirkbride	Deirdre Barlow	Coronation Street	1,439	2015-01-19	Breast cancer		Character killed off, possibly with brain aneurysm.
Monty Oum	Lie Ren	RWBY		2015-02-01	Allergic reaction	3	Character recast; replaced by his older brother Neath Oum as the current voice of Lie Ren.
Shirley Stelfox	Edna Birch	Emmerdale		2015-12-07	Cancer		Character killed off with ovarian cancer.
Yūko Mizutani	Sakiko Sakura	Chibi Maruko-chan		2016-05-17	Breast cancer		Character recast with Machiko Toyoshima taking over the role.
Alan Young	Scrooge McDuck	Mickey Mouse	2	2016-05-19	Natural causes	3	Character recast; replaced by John Kassir.
Anton Yelchin	Jim Lake Jr.	Trollhunters		2016-06-19	Blunt force trauma	3	Character recast during season 3 by Emile Hirsch. The series premiered in December 2016, six months after his death. Yelchin had recorded dialogue for three seasons, the last of which aired in 2018.
John McLaughlin	Host	The McLaughlin Group		2016-08-16	Prostate cancer		Series ended.
Carrie Fisher	Angela	Family Guy	32	2016-12-27	Cardiac arrest	15	Character killed off with an implied drowning in Season 17 episode, Pawtucket Pete.
Carrie Fisher	Mia	Catastrophe	6	2016-12-27	Cardiac arrest	4	Character killed off in Season 4, Episode 6.
Miguel Ferrer	Owen Granger	NCIS: Los Angeles	105	2017-01-19	Throat cancer	8	Character killed off by dying under a tree after battling cancer.
Miguel Ferrer	Albert Rosenfield	Twin Peaks	8 (original series); 11 (revival series)	2017-01-19	Throat cancer	3	Miniseries. Filmed before his death.
Miguel Ferrer	Stretch Monster	Stretch Armstrong and the Flex Fighters	10	2017-01-19	Throat cancer	1	Character recast; replaced by David Kaye.
Bill Paxton	Detective Frank Rourke	Training Day	13	2017-02-25	Complications from heart surgery	1	Series cancelled.
Charlie Murphy	Victor "Vic" Hargrove	Black Jesus	21	2017-04-12	Leukemia	2	Character written out.
Tino Insana	Mr. Grouper	Bubble Guppies	79	2017-05-31	Cancer	5	Character recast, replaced by Fred Tatasciore.
Glenne Headly	Diane Futterman	Future Man	5	2017-06-08	Pulmonary embolism	1	Character killed off.
Adam West	Mayor West	Family Guy	117	2017-06-10	Leukemia	15	Character killed off and has appeared as a ghost. West had recorded his voice for five episodes for season 16, which aired posthumously.
Larrington Walker	Samuel Palmer	Death in Paradise	1	2017-09-02	Undisclosed	7	Character written off as having escaped the island before the police could arrest him for the episode's murder.
John Dunsworth	Jim Lahey	Trailer Park Boys	99	2017-10-16	Undisclosed	12	Series ended. Replaced with Trailer Park Boys: The Animated Series, in which Dunsworth's character appeared using archive recordings of his voice.
Hiromi Tsuru	Bulma	Dragon Ball Super		2017-11-16	aortic dissection		Character recast; replaced by Aya Hisakawa for all future Dragon Ball roles.
Hiromi Tsuru	Dokin-chan	Soreike! Anpanman		2017-11-16	aortic dissection		Character recast; replaced by Miina Tominaga.
Reg E. Cathey	James Lucas	Luke Cage	7	2018-02-09	Lung cancer	2	Series cancelled.
Reg E. Cathey	Captain Quaid	Rapunzel's Tangled Adventure	2	2018-02-09	Lung cancer	2	Episodes Cathey had recorded were aired posthumously.
DuShon Monique Brown	Connie	Chicago Fire	59	2018-03-23	Sepsis	6	Character written out and she became a Counsellor.
Anthony Bourdain	Himself (host)	Anthony Bourdain: Parts Unknown		2018-06-08	Suicide		Series ended.
Barry Elliott	Barry Chuckle	Chuckle Time	12	2018-08-05	Bone cancer	1	Series cancelled.
Unshō Ishizuka	Narrator and Professor Oak	Pokémon	1,032	2018-08-13	Esophageal cancer	21	Characters recast by Kenyu Horiuchi.
Scott Wilson	Hershel Greene	The Walking Dead	33	2018-10-06	Leukemia	9	Character was already killed off in the season 4 episode, "Too Far Gone", which aired five years before Wilson's death, Wilson reprised his role as Hershel in a dream sequence in the season 9 episode, "What Comes After", which was filmed before his death and aired on November 4, 2018, a month after his death.
Scott Wilson	Abel Johnson	The OA	9	2018-10-06	Leukemia	2	Series cancelled.
Stan Lee	Mr. Frederickson, Fred's father	Big Hero 6: The Series	6	2018-11-12	Respiratory failure	2	Production completed on the first and second seasons before his death. The episode "Supersonic Sue" was dedicated to him.
Ricky Jay	T.H. Vignetti	Sneaky Pete	9	2018-11-24	Natural causes	3	Series cancelled.
Kristoff St. John	Neil Winters	The Young and the Restless	1,697	2019-02-03	Hypertrophic cardiomyopathy	46	Character killed off with a stroke.
Luke Perry	Fred Andrews	Riverdale	42	2019-03-04	Stroke	3	Character killed off with an off-screen hit-and-run accident in the season 4 premiere.
Mya-Lecia Naylor	Mya	Almost Never	13	2019-04-07	Death by misadventure	2	Character written out.
Cameron Boyce	Zach	Mrs. Fletcher	5	2019-07-06	Epileptic seizure	1	Miniseries. Completed before his death.
Cameron Boyce	Simon Ostergaard	Paradise City	8	2019-07-06	Epileptic seizure	1	Series premiered two years after his death, series renewed for second season in 2021, but no updates have been announced since then.
Russi Taylor	Minnie Mouse	Mickey Mouse	61	2019-07-26	Colon cancer	5	Series ended; replaced by The Wonderful World of Mickey Mouse with Minnie recast by Kaitlyn Robrock.
Russi Taylor	Minnie Mouse	Mickey and the Roadster Racers	70	2019-07-26	Colon cancer	2	Character recast; replaced by Kaitlyn Robrock.
Russi Taylor	Various characters (most notably Martin Prince and Sherri and Terri)	The Simpsons	193	2019-07-26	Colon cancer	30	Certain characters recast, including Martin Prince, Sherri and Terri; replaced by Grey DeLisle.
Linda Porter	Myrtle Vartanian	Superstore	35	2019-09-25	Cancer	5	Character killed off.
John Witherspoon	Lloyd Hamilton	Black Jesus	31	2019-10-29	Heart attack	3	Series cancelled.
Brian Tarantina	Jacopo "Jackie" Dellapietra	The Marvelous Mrs. Maisel	16	2019-11-02		3	Character killed off of a stroke in the season 4 episode "Everything is Bellmore".
Cha In-ha	Joo Won-seok	Love with Flaws		2019-12-03	Suicide	1	Series ended.
Brian Dennehy	Dominic Wilkinson	The Blacklist	9	2020-04-15	Cardiac arrest due to sepsis	7	Character recast; replaced by Ron Raines in the season 8 premiere. Later, character killed off from his injuries.
Fred Willard	Albert "Pop-Pop" Johnson	The Loud House	7	2020-05-15	Heart attack	5	Character recast; replaced by Christopher Swindle for the episode "Resident Upheaval" and later by Piotr Michael.
Fred Willard	Fred Naird	Space Force	3	2020-05-15	Heart attack	1	Character killed off.
Naya Rivera	Collette Jones	Step Up	20	2020-07-08	Accidental drowning	3	Character recast; taken over by Christina Milian. Later, series cancelled.
Haruma Miura	Keita Saruwatari	Love Begins When the Money Ends	4	2020-07-18	Suicide by hanging		Miniseries.
Chadwick Boseman	T'Challa / Star-Lord	What If...?	4	2020-08-28	Colon cancer	1	Character written out as having returned to his own universe. Later, character killed off in the 2022 film, Black Panther: Wakanda Forever.
Diana Rigg	Mrs Pumphrey	All Creatures Great and Small	2	2020-09-10	Cancer	1	Character recast; taken over by Patricia Hodge.
Archie Lyndhurst	Ollie Coulton	So Awkward	6	2020-09-22	Brain hemorrhage caused by acute lymphoblastic leukemia	6	Character written out.
Clark Middleton	Glen Carter	The Blacklist	13	2020-10-04	West Nile Virus	8	Character killed off with West Nile Virus.
Bobby Ball	Frank	Not Going Out	21	2020-10-28	COVID-19	11	Character killed off-screen.
Alex Trebek	Host	Jeopardy!	8000+	2020-11-08	Pancreatic cancer	37	A series of interim hosts served as temporary replacements for the remainder of season 37; except for the first week where Mike Richards was host, Mayim Bialik and Ken Jennings served as longer-term interim hosts for season 38. This arrangement was made permanent for season 39, though Bialik left the show following that season, and Jennings became the sole host starting in season 40.
Kirby Morrow	Cole	Lego Ninjago		2020-11-18	Accidental substance overdose	14	Character recast; replaced by Andrew Francis.
Taran Kootenhayoo	Cousin Randall	Molly of Denali		2020-12-31	Leukemia	2	Character recast; replaced by Jared Ager-Foster.
Christopher Plummer	Howard Lawson	Departure	12	2021-02-05	Complications from a fall	2	Character written out without explanation.
George Segal	Albert "Pops" Solomon	The Goldbergs		2021-03-23	Complications from bypass surgery	8	Character killed off.
Jessica Walter	Malory Archer	Archer	110	2021-03-24	Undisclosed	12	Walter finished recording lines for the twelfth season prior to her death, with the season ending with her character retiring to an unlocated island with her husband.
Helen McCrory	Elizabeth 'Polly' Gray (née Shelby)	Peaky Blinders	30	2021-04-14	Breast cancer	6	Character killed off, was assassinated before first episode of season 6.
Helen McCrory	Stelmaria, Asriel's dæmon	His Dark Materials	4	2021-04-14	Breast cancer	3	Character recast; taken over by Victoria Hamilton.
Lisa Banes	Speria Balask	The Orville	4	2021-06-14	Traumatic brain injury after struck by an electric scooter	3	TBD. Fourth season currently in production.
Philece Sampler	Rokuta Kamado	Demon Slayer: Kimetsu no Yaiba (English dub)	1	2021-07-01	Heart attack	2	Series ended in 2024.
Philece Sampler	Sabine Cheng and Ms. Mendeleiev	Miraculous: Tales of Ladybug & Cat Noir (English dub)		2021-07-01	Heart attack	4	Characters recast; replaced as Sabine by Anne Yatco. Ms. Mendeleiev's new actress is currently unknown.
Sean Lock	Team Captain	8 Out of 10 Cats Does Countdown		2021-08-16	Cancer	22	Series continued with several guest star teams, before Rob Beckett became the Team Captain from series 29 in 2025.
Ed Asner	Carl Fredricksen	Dug Days	5	2021-08-29	Natural causes	1	Series premiered three days after his death. Series later cancelled.
Ed Asner	Sid Weinberg	Cobra Kai	3	2021-08-29	Natural causes	3	Character written out without explanation, with the fourth season premiere being dedicated to his memory.
Michael K. Williams	Smokey Greenwood	F Is for Family	18	2021-09-07	Acute combined drug intoxication	5	Series ended.
Norm Macdonald	Yaphit	The Orville	22	2021-09-14	Acute leukemia	3	TBD. Fourth season currently in production.
Willie Garson	Stanford Blatch	And Just Like That...	27 (original series as Sex and the City); 3 (revival series)	2021-09-21	Pancreatic cancer	1	Character written out as having moved to Tokyo.
Octavio Ocaña	Benito Rivers	Vecinos	195	2021-10-29	Gunshot wound	12	Character written out to have moved after landing a role for a television series.
Will Ryan	Willie the Giant	Mickey Mouse Funhouse	5	2021-11-19	Cancer	1	Character recast; taken over by Brock Powell.
Kim Mi-soo	Yeo Jeong-min	Snowdrop	7	2022-01-05	Undisclosed	1	Series ended.
Gaspard Ulliel	Anton Mogart	Moon Knight	1	2022-01-19	Skiing accident	1	Completed filming three months before his death. He appeared as a guest star on the third episode, "The Friendly Type", which aired two months after his death, on April 13, 2022, and was dedicated to him.
Gaspard Ulliel	Jérôme Attias	Of Money and Blood	12	2022-01-19	Skiing accident	1	Ulliel was on a break from filming the miniseries at the time of his death. Still had 84 more days of filming left. Production delayed; character recast; replaced by Niels Schneider.
Lindsey Pearlman	Karen	Haus of Vicious	6	2022-02-18	Suicide by intentional overdose of sodium nitrite.	1	Series premiered six months after her death, character's fate unknown.
Lindsey Pearlman	Martha	The Ms. Pat Show	4	2022-02-18	Suicide by intentional overdose of sodium nitrite.	2	Character written out.
William Hurt	Stephen Holstrom	Pantheon	8	2022-03-12	Prostate cancer	1	Character killed off from cancer in the season 2 episode, "Apokalypsis".
Papangkorn Rerkchalermpoj	Coach Eak	Thai Cave Rescue	6	2022-03-23	Died in his sleep		Miniseries.
Gilbert Gottfried	Digit and Widget	Cyberchase	86	2022-04-12	Ventricular tachycardia	13	Character recast; replaced by Ron Pardo.
Robert Morse	Santa Claus	Teen Titans Go!	10	2022-04-20	Heart failure		Character recast, replaced by Fred Tatasciore.
Mike Hagerty	Ed Miller	Somebody Somewhere	6	2022-05-05	Seizure caused by antibiotics	2	Character written out, Hagerty was paid tribute in the season 2 finale with his character's absence explained to have been on a boat trip.
Marnie Schulenburg	Maggie Caysen	City on a Hill	6	2022-05-17	Breast cancer	3	Series cancelled.
Ray Liotta	James "Big Jim" Keene	Black Bird	6	2022-05-26	Heart failure and pulmonary edema	1	Miniseries. Filmed a year before his death.
Billy Kametz	Ren and Ash's Rotom Phone	Pokémon (English dub)	65	2022-06-09	Colon cancer	25	Character recast; replaced by Barrett Leddy.
Billy Kametz	Niccolo	Attack on Titan (English dub)	8	2022-06-09	Colon cancer	4	Series ended.
Billy Kametz	Naofumi Iwatani	Rising of the Shield Hero (English dub)		2022-06-09	Colon cancer	2	Character recast; replaced by Stephen Fu.
Billy Kametz	Macaque	Lego Monkie Kid	37	2022-06-09	Colon cancer	4	Character recast; replaced by Alejandro Saab.
Jak Knight	DeVon	Big Mouth	28	2022-07-14	Suicide by gunshot	6	Character written out without explanation.
Paul Sorvino	Frank Costello	Godfather of Harlem	11	2022-07-25	Undisclosed	3	Character written out without explanation.
Bernard Cribbins	Wilfred Mott	Doctor Who	10	2022-07-28	Undisclosed	1	Cribbins posthumously appeared in the 60th anniversary special, "Wild Blue Yonder", as he had filmed his scenes for the special shortly before his death.
Anne Heche	Jocelyn's mother	The Idol	6	2022-08-12	Injuries caused by motor vehicle crash	1	Character written out and scenes with her character filmed before her death were deleted.
Coolio	Kwanzaa-bot	Futurama	4	2022-09-28	Accidental fentanyl overdose	8	Recorded his lines for the revival before his death.
Leslie Jordan	Phil	Call Me Kat	39	2022-10-24	Sudden cardiac dysfunction	3	Character written out as having moved to Tahiti. Jordan completed filming on eight episodes for the third season before his death, four of which aired posthumously.
Stephen "tWitch" Boss	Himself/Judge	So You Think You Can Dance		2022-12-13	Suicide	17	Replaced by a new judging panel.
Ignacio López Tarso	Don Lorenzo	Vecinos	4	2023-03-11	Pneumonia	14	Character killed off in season 15. His final appearance in Vecinos was the season 14 episode "Foto familiar", originally aired eight days after his death.
Lance Reddick	Zeus	Percy Jackson and the Olympians	1	2023-03-16	Heart disease	1	Filming completed before his death, the episode he appeared on, "The Prophecy Comes True", premiered ten months after his death, and was dedicated to his memory. Later, character recast by Courtney B. Vance in season 2.
Lance Reddick	Lex Luthor	Kite Man: Hell Yeah!	4	2023-03-16	Heart disease	1	Series premiered over a year after his death. Later recast by Amuche Chukudebelu for remaining episodes.
Marion Game	Huguette	Scènes de ménages	1504+	2023-03-23		14	Character killed off.
Charles Stanley	Host	In Touch with Dr. Charles Stanley		2023-04-18		27	Series ended.
Jock Zonfrillo	Host/Judge	MasterChef Australia	234	2023-04-30	Undisclosed	15	Replaced by a new judging panel.
Jacklyn Zeman	Bobbie Spencer	General Hospital	1,201	2023-05-10	Cancer	50	Character killed off.
Samantha Weinstein	Clara Tinhorn	Dino Ranch		2023-05-14	Ovarian cancer	3	Series ended, replaced by spin-off series Dino Ranch: Island Explorers.
Ray Stevenson	Baylan Skroll	Ahsoka	8	2023-05-21		1	Character recast by Rory McCann in season 2.
Treat Williams	Lenny Ross	Blue Bloods	6	2023-06-12	Motorcycle accident	14	Character killed off from cancer in the season 14 episode, "Fear No Evil".
Treat Williams	William S. Paley	Feud: Capote vs. The Swans	8	2023-06-12	Motorcycle accident	1	Miniseries. Filmed before his death.
Angus Cloud	Fezco "Fez" O'Neill	Euphoria	16	2023-07-31	Drug overdose caused by acute intoxication	3	Character written out and is in prison off-screen.
Johnny Hardwick	Dale Gribble	King of the Hill	258	2023-08-08	Undisclosed	14	Recorded his lines for six episodes of the revival series before his death. Character recast by Toby Huss for the remaining episodes.
Ron Cephas Jones	Elijah Muhammad	Genius: MLK/X	8	2023-08-19	Undisclosed	4	Miniseries.
David McCallum	Donald "Ducky" Mallard	NCIS	372	2023-09-25	Natural causes	21	Character killed off in his sleep in the season 21 episode, "The Stories We Leave Behind". After McCallum’s death, Adam Campbell continued to portray the younger version of McCallum’s character in the second season of NCIS: Origins and the 23rd season of NCIS.
Haydn Gwynne	Queen Camilla	The Windsors	20	2023-10-20	Cancer	4	TBD. Production on the fourth series suspended for unrelated reason.
Andre Braugher	A. B. Wyner	The Residence	4	2023-12-11	Lung cancer	1	Character recast; replaced by Giancarlo Esposito. Character killed off in the pilot episode, "The Fall of the House of Usher".
Steve Halliwell	Zak Dingle	Emmerdale	2,795	2023-12-15	Undisclosed		Character killed off.
Kamar de los Reyes	Hector Ayala / White Tiger	Daredevil: Born Again	2	2023-12-24	Cancer	1	Character killed off in the season 1 episode, "The Hollow of His Hand".
Kamar de los Reyes	Coach Montes	All American	8	2023-12-24	Cancer	6	TBD. Eighth season currently in production.
Adan Canto	Arman Morales	The Cleaning Lady	26	2024-01-08	Appendiceal cancer	3	Character killed off by sacrificing himself in the season 3 episode, "El Reloj".
Bill Hayes	Doug Williams	Days of Our Lives	2,157	2024-01-12	Undisclosed	59	His final appearance premiered on July 11, 2024, six months after his death. His onscreen death occurred on the November 28, 2024 episode.
Carl Weathers	Greef Karga	The Mandalorian	10	2024-02-01	Atherosclerotic cardiovascular disease	3	Series cancelled; Season 4 scrapped and reworked into The Mandalorian and Grogu.
Kenneth Mitchell	Joe	The Old Man	3	2024-02-24	ALS	2	Series cancelled.
Tarako	Momoko "Maruko" Sakura	Chibi Maruko-chan	1,421	2024-03-04	Undisclosed	34	Character recast, replaced by Kokoro Kikuchi.
Chance Perdomo	Andre Anderson	Gen V	8	2024-03-29	Motorcycle accident	2	Character killed off-screen in a failed escape attempt of using his powers.
Cole Brings Plenty	Pete Plenty Clouds	1923	2	2024-04-05	Undisclosed	2	Character recast, replaced by Jeremy Gauna.
Brian McCardie	Isaac Grant	Outlander: Blood of My Blood	10	2024-04-28	Aortic dissection	1	TBD. Series premiered over a year after his death. Second season currently in production.
Bernard Hill	Tom Carson	The Responder	5	2024-05-05	Undisclosed	2	TBD. Season 2 premiere aired on the day of his death.
Philip Williams	Buzz	Cyberchase		2024-09-08	Undisclosed	15	Character recast; replaced by Peter Cugno.
David Graham	Grandpa Pig and Mr. Zebra the Postman	Peppa Pig	95	2024-09-20	Undisclosed	8	Episodes featuring Graham's voice continues to be released until 2027.
Drake Hogestyn	John Black	Days of Our Lives	4,425	2024-09-28	Pancreatic cancer	59	His final appearance premiered on September 9, 2024, two weeks before his death. Character killed off of a gunshot wound.
Liam Payne	Himself/Judge	Building the Band	10	2024-10-16	Falling from height	1	Completed filming two months before Payne's death. Series released ten months after his death.
Paul Teal	Pastor Pete	The Hunting Wives	6	2024-11-15	Neuroendocrine tumor	1	TBD. Series premiered nine months after his death. Second season currently in production.
Linda Lavin	Sybil Schneiderman	Mid-Century Modern	8	2024-12-29	Lung cancer	1	Died during production of the first season. Completed seven episodes of a ten-episode order before her death, with scenes featuring Lavin filmed for the fourth episode used in episode eight. Series premiered three months after her death, with character killed off of a heart attack in the episode, "Here's to You, Mrs. Schneiderman".
Linda Lavin	Phyllis	No Good Deed	3	2024-12-29	Lung cancer	1	Series cancelled.
Lee Joo-sil	Park Mal-soon, Hwang Jun-ho's mother	Squid Game	2	2025-02-02	Stomach Cancer	3	Character written out as having moved to Los Angeles.
Lynne Marie Stewart	Bonnie Kelly	It's Always Sunny in Philadelphia	18	2025-02-21	Cancer	17	TBD.
Jonathan Joss	John Redcorn	King of the Hill		2025-06-01	Murdered by gunshot wounds	15	TBD. Fourteenth/revival season completed before Joss' death, which he recorded dialogue for four episodes and premiered two months after his death. 15th season currently in production.
Anne Burrell	Host/Judge	Worst Cooks in America	210	2025-06-17	Suicide	29	Season 29 was filmed before her death and was released posthumously. Replaced by a new judging panel.
Joe Marinelli	Donny Spagnoli	The Morning Show	22	2025-06-22	Undisclosed	4	TBD.
Cary-Hiroyuki Tagawa	Master Eiji, the Swordmaker	Blue Eye Samurai	6	2025-12-04	Stroke	2	TBD. Season 2 currently in production and scheduled to premiere in 2026, after Tagawa's death.
Rob Reiner	Albert Schnur	The Bear	3	2025-12-14	Murdered by stabbing	5	Fifth season paid tribute to him. A one-sided conversation over the phone happens with character Ebra. The conversation ends with Ebra making a nod to Reiner's The Princess Bride by saying " As you wish."
Catherine O'Hara	Patty Leigh	The Studio	10	2026-01-30	Pulmonary embolism	2	TBD. Second season currently in production.
Catherine O'Hara	Gail	The Last of Us	3	2026-01-30	Pulmonary embolism	3	TBD. Third season currently in production.
James Van Der Beek	Dean Wilson	Elle		2026-02-11	Colorectal cancer	2	TBD. First season filmed before his death. Second season currently in production.
Eric Dane	Cal Jacobs	Euphoria	18	2026-02-19	ALS	3	Third season filmed before his death. Series ended.
Patrick Stewart	Avery Bullock	American Dad		2026-10-28	Alzheimer's disease and Lewy body dementia	22	TBD
Maria Alicia Delgado	Dora	¿Tú crees?	67	2026-11-04		5	TBD. Season 5 ended prior to her death.

== See also ==
- List of entertainers who died during a performance
- List of television programs in which one character was played by multiple actors
- List of works published posthumously
