= Clara Vestris Webster =

English ballet dancer (1821–1844)

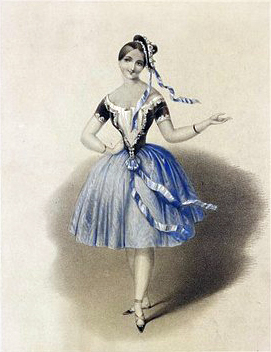
- Webster as Nancy in The Statue Fair
- Born: Clara Vestris Webster; Bath, Somerset, England
- Baptised: 24 December 1821
- Died: 17 December 1844 (aged 22); Regent's Park, London, England
- Burial place: Kensal Green Cemetery
- Occupation: Ballet dancer
- Years active: 1830–1844
- Known for: Circumstances surrounding her death
- Notable work: The Revolt of the Harem

Clara Vestris Webster (baptised 24 December 1821 – 17 December 1844) was an English ballet dancer. After a career that spanned 14 years, she became well-known for the circumstances surrounding her death.

== Biography ==
=== Early life ===
Clara Vestris Webster was born in Bath, Somerset, England, at an unknown date in 1821 and was baptised at Bath Abbey on 24 December 1821, the eldest child to Benjamin Webster and his second wife, Mary (née Higgs). She had three siblings, two brothers and a sister, and six paternal half-siblings, four half-brothers and two half-sisters.

==== Education ====
Webster studied dance in Bath with her father, who had studied with the French dancer Auguste Vestris, thus her middle name.

=== Career ===
Webster made her professional debut at the Theatre Royal, Bath in 1830, at the age of nine, with a pas de deux with her brother, Arthur. She was one of the first British dancers to perform the cachucha and the tyrolienne, the latter which she danced with her brother.

=== Death ===
Webster died at her apartment, 54 Upper Norton Street, in Regent's Park, London on 17 December 1844. She was 22. Her death came at 3:10AM. Three days earlier, her dress had caught fire when the light drapery came in contact with an oil lamp during the bath scene in the closing performance of the 1833 ballet The Revolt of the Harem at the Theatre Royal, Drury Lane. She suffered severe burns to her arms, bosom, and face, and was transported to the home of Dr. Locock in Hanover Square, Westminster, who took her to King's College Hospital. The coroner's inquest into her death took place in West Middlesex the day after her death. She was buried in the family vault at Kensal Green Cemetery in the Kensal Green area of North Kensington on 24 December (Christmas Eve) 1844.
