= Jane Little =

- Born: Jane Findley; February 2, 1929; Atlanta, Georgia, U.S.
- Died: May 15, 2016 (aged 87) Atlanta, Georgia, U.S.
- Genre: Classical
- Occupation: Double bass player
- Years active: 1945–2016

Jane Little (née Findley; February 2, 1929 – May 15, 2016) was an American classical double bass player, known for her exceptionally long tenure with the Atlanta Symphony Orchestra.

== Early life ==
Jane Findley was a native of Atlanta, Georgia. Her mother was a self-taught pianist, and one of her aunts ran a dancing school. As a young girl, Jane dreamed of becoming a ballerina, but was told that her feet "weren't right". Instead, she taught herself to play the piano (on a neighbor's piano, as her family did not own one).

Although small in stature, Findley took up the double bass, a 6-foot-tall (1.8 m) instrument and the largest of the string instruments, while attending Girls High School in Atlanta. She joined the local youth orchestra after studying the instrument for two years. After high school, she attended the University of Georgia.

== Career ==
At age 16, Findley became a charter member of the Atlanta Youth Symphony Orchestra, making her debut on February 4, 1945. Two years later, after opening its ranks to adult musicians, the ensemble became the Atlanta Symphony Orchestra (ASO). Findley went on to serve as the ASO's assistant principal bass, performing with the orchestra for a total of more than 71 years.

For many years Findley was the only woman in the orchestra. She married Warren Little, the ASO's principal flute player, in September 1953. Mrs. Little, who stood 4 feet 11 inches (1.50 m) in height, said that she was glad to have her husband, who was 6 feet 2 inches (1.88 m) tall, carry her double bass around for her, while she carried his flute.

According to Guinness World Records, Little holds the world record for longest tenure with a single orchestra. She set the record during a performance on February 1, 2016. The previous record holder was Frances Darger, who played violin for the Utah Symphony for 70 years, until her retirement in 2012.

Little collapsed on stage on May 15, 2016, as the orchestra played an arrangement of "There's No Business Like Show Business"; she was subsequently pronounced dead at an Atlanta hospital. She was undergoing treatment for multiple myeloma at the time. Her husband had preceded her in death in 2002, and she had no surviving immediate family members.

== See also ==
- List of entertainers who died during a performance
