= Frank I. Frayne =

American actor and sharpshooter (1839–1891)

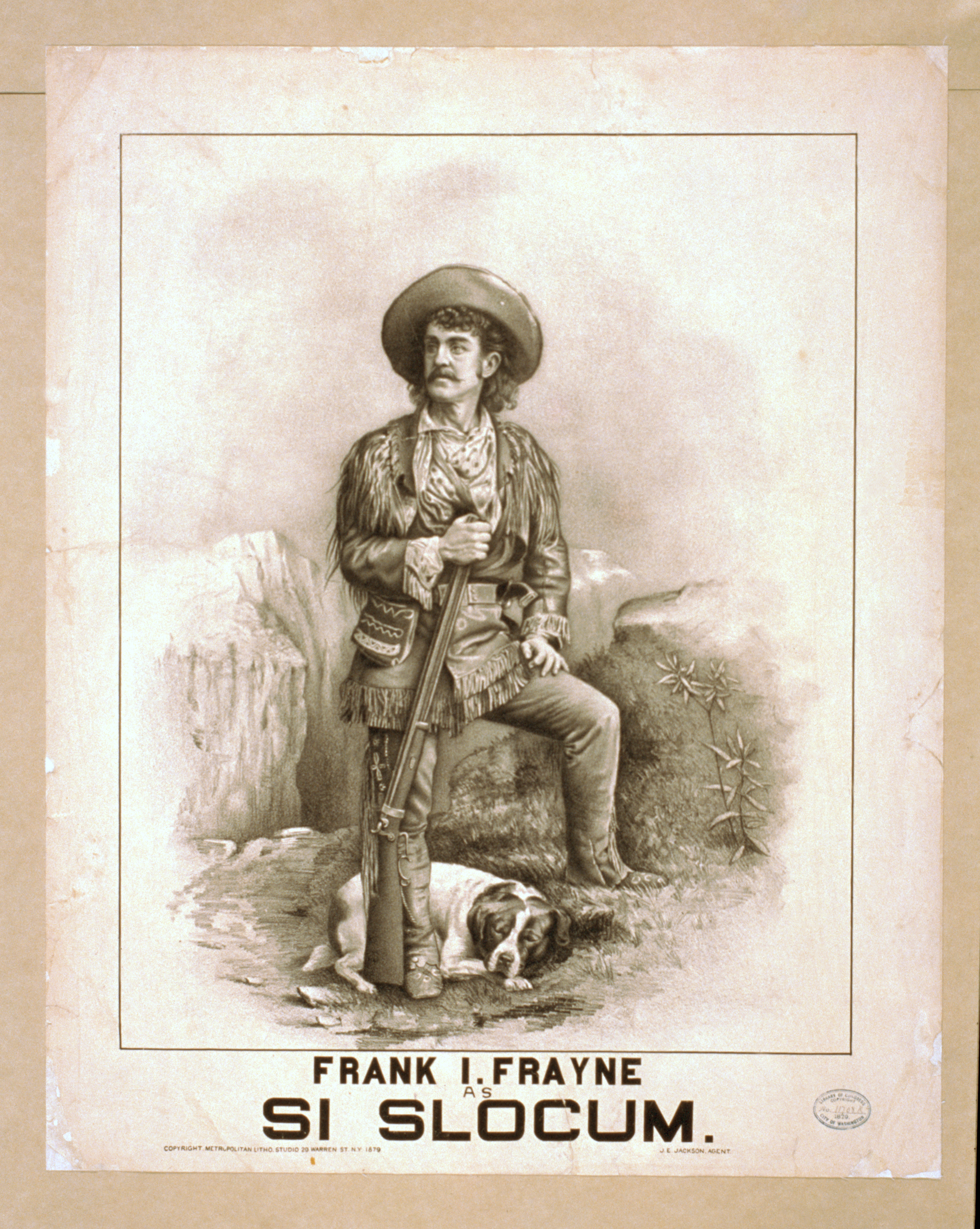
- Frayne circa 1879, in Si Slocum the piece in which he killed Annie Von Behren.
- Born: Danville, Kentucky
- Died: March 16, 1891 (aged 51); Chicago, Illinois
- Resting place: Mount Greenwood Cemetery
- Occupations: sharpshooter, actor

Frank Ivers Frayne (March 19, 1839 – March 16, 1891) was a popular American actor and sharpshooter most notable for accidentally killing his fiancée on stage in a botched stunt.

Frayne was known for doing shooting stunts during his stage performances, including most famously shooting an apple off the head of another actor reminiscent of William Tell, and also while standing backward and using a mirror to aim, in a piece called Si Slocum. Tragically he killed his fiancée Annie Von Behren doing this stunt at a show in Cincinnati in 1882 when his firearm malfunctioned. He was arrested and tried for manslaughter, but exonerated at trial.

Frayne died at his apartment in Chicago on March 16, 1891, of heart failure.
