= Julien Arnold =

Actor

Julien Arnold (1964–2024) was an actor, director, and teacher.

== Early life and education ==
Born to English parents, Arnold lived in Tanzania until 1969 before growing up in Edmonton. He earned a BFA in 1989 and an MFA in directing in 2006, both from the University of Alberta.

== Career ==
Arnold performed at most of Edmonton's major theatres. At the Citadel Theatre, Arnold was a frequent performer in its annual production of A Christmas Carol, playing roles such as Bob Cratchit, Scrooge (2017), and Fezziwig (2024). Other notable Citadel credits include Bottom in A Midsummer Night's Dream, for which he won an Elizabeth Sterling Haynes Award, and Travels with My Aunt, which also earned him a Sterling Award.

As a founding member of the Free Will Players, Arnold regularly appeared in its summer Shakespeare productions. With Teatro La Quindicina, he performed in numerous comedies by Stewart Lemoine, including Shockers Delight! (1993) and The Finest of Strangers (2018). His work in the Edmonton Fringe Festival production of A Picasso earned him a Sterling Award for Outstanding Fringe Performance.

In 2008, Arnold founded The Atlas Theatre Collective, for which he directed productions such as Martin McDonagh's The Lonesome West and Lee Blessing’s Going to St. Ives.
