= Annie Von Behren =

American actress (1857-1882)

Annie Von Behren (1857 – November 30, 1882) was an American stage actress of the 19th century from New York City. Her family moved to Brooklyn, New York when she was quite young. Von Behren was educated in the Brooklyn public schools.

== Stage actress ==
Von Behren was a forewoman for a dry goods store in Brooklyn, when at the age of 19, she realized a sudden yearning to become an actress. She studied acting with Rose Watson, who previously had been a variety performer on stage. Von Behren's career as a dramatic actress began in 1876, traveling for a year with Rose and Harry Watson. She appeared in Catharine Mavourneen and Trodden-down Dick, or a Child of the Streets. Afterwards she performed in The Two Orphans and Imogene. She also traveled with Annie Louise Buckingham, playing the title role in Mazeppa.

In 1880 Von Behren became a leading member of the stock company of the Coliseum Theater in Cincinnati, Ohio. She was there for most of the season before finishing in Newark, New Jersey at Wallman's Opera House. Von Behren joined the Si Slocum company of Frank Frayne at Harry Miner's Theater in the fall of 1881. She left the company prior to the end of the season and returned to Wallman's. There she played in Lucretia Borgia and Lady of Lyons. She closed the season with Frayne at Niblo's Garden in Mardo; or Nihilists of St. Petersburg, Russia.

== Accidental death ==
Von Behren began a western tour with Frayne's company beginning in September 1882. She was a part of a matinee performance of Si Slocum at the Coliseum in Cincinnati on Thanksgiving Day. During the fourth act of this production she was shot in the head and killed by Frayne, when he pointed a .22 caliber parlor rifle at her and it accidentally discharged. The bullet entered her skull just above the eye and she died within fifteen minutes. The curtain fell, the play stopped, and Frayne was arrested immediately. The audience believed the actress was only slightly injured, yet there was near panic in the theater when the curtain came down.

During a police deposition on December 2 Frayne stated that "the thread of the screw which held the spring catch was worn or torn off, and that sent the bullet below its aim." He was attempting a backward shot when the catch snap of the rifle "became imperfect and slipped just as the hammer was released." Frayne's breast and neck were burned black by the powder emitted by the breech of the gun.

The presiding judge agreed with the actor who claimed to have pointed the gun at an apple six inches above the head of Von Behren. The prosecution rested but contended a charge of manslaughter should have been upheld because of a statute. The law forbade a person from pointing a loaded gun at or toward another person. When Frayne was discharged from the court, the decision to free the actor was given "emphatic applause." Newspapers reported Frayne and Von Behren were engaged to be married.

The remains of Annie Von Behren were sent on the Baltimore and Ohio Railroad to Brooklyn on December 2. They were destined for the home of her parents, at No. 180 Stockton Street, Brooklyn. Frank Frayne and the entire stock company accompanied the body and attended the actress' funeral. Her acting was the family's chief means of support.
