= Uniflor =

Coordinates: 23°03′S 52°09′W

- Municipality
- Interactive map of Uniflor
- Country: Brazil
- Region: Southern
- State: Paraná
- Mesoregion: Noroeste Paranaense

Population (2020)
  - Total: 2,614
- Time zone: UTC−3 (BRT)

Uniflor is a municipality in the state of Paraná in the Southern Region of Brazil.

== See also ==
- List of municipalities in Paraná
