= The Revolt of the Harem =

1830s ballet

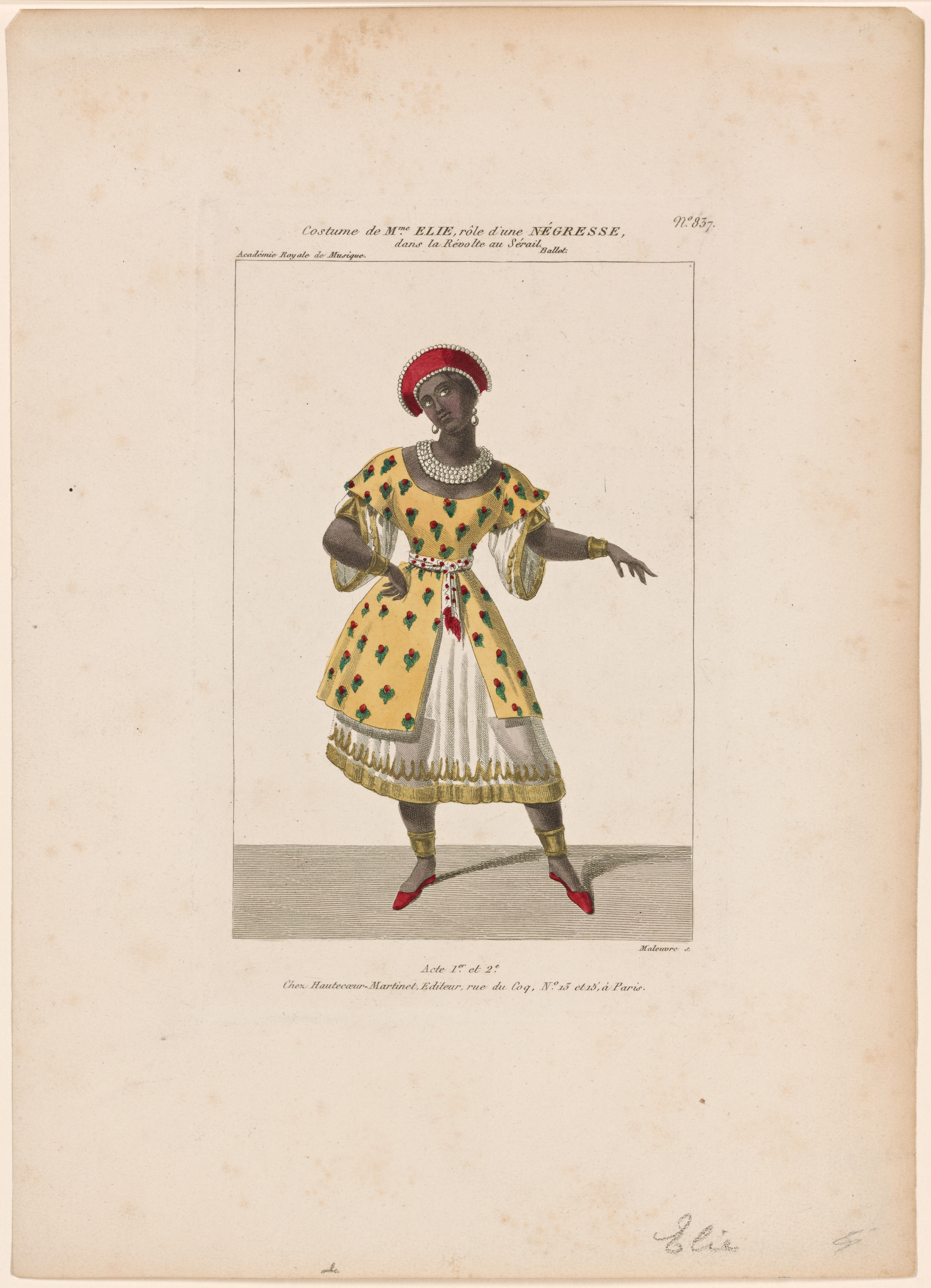
- Native title: La Révolte au sérail
- Choreographer: Filippo Taglioni
- Libretto: Alfred Bunn
- Premiere: 12 April 1833

The Revolt of the Harem is a ballet created and performed in the 1830s.

== Background ==
The ballet was originally produced by Taglioni of the l'Academie Royale á Paris under the title La Révolte au sérail. Premiering in Paris on April 12, 1833, Filippo Taglioni's work was later adapted, restaged, and renamed for English audiences by Alfred Bunn (the Manager of the Theatre Royal, Covent Garden) to draw English audiences. The 1834 season in London saw 43 sold-out performances.

Princess Victoria attended a performance of The Revolt of the Harem at the Covent Garden Theatre on February 11, 1834.

The ballet debuted in America at Niblo's Garden on July 8, 1844, directed by William Mitchell.

== Synopsis ==
The Revolt of the Harem depicts women revolting from a harem in Muslim Granada.
